= List of model car brands =

This page lists model car brand names past and present. The list is inclusive with slush mold, tinplate, pressed steel, diecast zamac, white metal, plastic and resin models and toys from all over the world. A few are even made of crystal, glass, wood, coal or other materials. Some of the brands here are more toy-like and others are purely for adult collectors. Some are from design model organizations and were never intended for sale. The price of some when new was less than 50 cents, while others cost hundreds or thousands of dollars. Some are kits, some are kits that are specially handbuilt, but many are factory preassembled. Some are promotional in approach while others are solidly set in the retail realm. Some are stationary and do not roll while others roll or have friction or pull-back motors. At a different end of the spectrum, many are remote control. Models of all different sizes are represented, but the typical range is between 1:18 (about 11 inches) to 1:87 (about an inch and a half).

== A ==
- AB Minicars – Diecast model cars made in Thailand.
- AB-Models – AutoBarn Models
- Abrex Kovove Modely Aut – Czech firm, Škoda models in 1:43, 1:24 & some 1:18. Also 1:18 scale Jawa motorcycles.
- A.C. Gilbert Company – American manufacturer of 1:32 scale slot cars and sets, 1930s–1960s, though mostly made erector sets.
- Academy Plastic Model – Korean plastic model maker, mostly military vehicles. Associated with dinky
- Accurate Miniatures – Molded kits made for this company by Monogram. 1:24 scale.
- ACME – Hong Kong maker of plastic toys
- Action Collectibles – Mainly NASCAR, other stock car diecast, drag racing cars.
- Agama Racing – 1:8 radio-controlled buggy specialist
- Agat (previously known as Tantal and Mossar) – Soviet/Russian model car brand from Saratov, making 1:43 scale metal models of Soviet and Russian car brands
- Airfix – British plastic car and airplane kits. Some built plastic HO military and other toys.
- Almost Real
- Aluminum Metal Toys (AMT) – American promotional model and kit company dating from 1948.
- Amalgam Collection - Artisan hand-made 1:8 scale model cars. Headquartered in Bristol, England. Also makes 1:12 and 1:18 scale models.
- American Diecast Company (ADC)
- Amloid – Mostly cast plastic toys, like Gay Toys or Processed Plastic – often very clever and realistic.
- AMR Andre Marie Ruf / AMR Century – White metal built and kits, supplied Danhausen and bought by Danhausen.
- AMW – German 1:87 scale (HO) plastic, mostly trucks and buses/coaches with authentic liveries. Name was changed to AWM.
- Anguplas – Spanish 1:87 scale maker from the early 1960s
- Anker – Plastic toys from East Germany 1960s-1970s. Name later changed to Piko
- Anson – Mostly 1:18 scale from Hong Kong, mostly European vehicles. Engine compartments can be especially detailed and colorful.
- Aoshima – Japanese plastic & metal model manufacturer. Includes Skynet brand, Miracle House brand, DISM brand and FunnyKnights brand.
- Aoyagi Metals Company – Japanese slot car and radio controlled car
- Apex Replicas – Australian producer of 1:18 and 1:43 scale diecast and resin model cars
- Arcade – Primitive producer of cast vehicles mainly in the 1930s
- ARCO – Plastic toys from USA, later diecast, but not sure if it was the same manufacturer
- Ari Unic – East German plastic reproductions of French Norev models
- Arii Plastic Model – 1980s 1:24 scale kits from Japan, became Micro Ace.
- Arnold – West German tinplate and later plastic toys
- Artin – Chinese manufacturer of 1:64, 1:43, and 1:32 scale cars and track.
- Asahi – Japanese tin, but also diecast "Model Pet" series as agent in Japan for Corgi & Lone Star.
- Atlas – Chinese 1:76 (buses), 1:87 (tram cars), and 1:43 scale diecast models, some recasts of Norevs also reissues of old Dinkys with old packaging designs.
- ATMA Paulista – Plastic 1:24 scale cars made in São Paulo, especially notable for the DKW-Vemag Belcar, apparently a promotional
- Auburn Rubber Company – Early American producer of rubber cars.
- Aurora Plastics Corporation – American manufacturer of 1:24 static kits and developer of the pioneering Model Motoring and AFX lines (HO) as well as 1:32 and 1:48 slot cars.
- AUTOart – Established in 1998. Other lines of diecast vehicles formerly associated with AUTOart were Gateway, Gate and UT Models. The latter was originally a German company with diecast cars made in China and associated with Paul's Model Art which produces Minichamps. AUTOart makes diecast and composite (ABS + diecast) model cars, and diecast motorcycles. The car models have been divided over time into various series, including the Millennium series, Performance series, Signature series and the Composite series.
- AutoBarn Models – AB-Models
- AutoDux – German windup metal and plastic toys from the 1960s. Also known as Dux.
- Automodello – Hand-built, highly detailed, signed/autographed, limited and standard edition 1:43 scale resincast manufacturer. Features TVR, Griffith, Fitch, and Bricklin.
- AUTO METAL - AURO METAL – Yugolasvia 1:50 scale during the communist era and after it. Only built a single model Yugo- ZASTAVA KORAL.
- Auto Pilen – Spanish manufacturer of die-cast models in 1:43 and 1:64. Made by Pilen S.A.
- Auto Place Model – Based in Hong Kong.
- Autosculpt –
- Auto World – American brand of die-cast models and slot cars in 1:18 and 1:64, which specializes in American-made cars. Owned by Round 2 LLC.
- Avanstyle
- AWM – German 1:87 scale (HO) plastic, mostly trucks and buses/coaches with authentic liveries.
- Axial R/C – famous for rock crawlers.

== B ==
- Bandai – Formerly large tin plate; plastic kits; now produces toy cars often related to anime merchandising (e.g. Transformers).
- Ban Seng – Malaysian manufacturer from the 2000s, specializing in 1:43 concept cars made in very short production runs.
- Bang – Italian manufacturer, later 1980s, specializing in 1:43 Ferraris, picked up where Box Models left off.
- Banthrico – Die cast car banks in 1:25th and other scales. Promo maker in the early 1950s. Made banks through the 1990s.
- Bapro – Swedish toy maker in the late 1940s, early 1950s
- Barclay – American simple metal toys of the 1950s & 1960s – similar to Tootsietoy. Known for tiny cars about 2.5 cm (1 inch) long.
- Barni - The brand name indicated on the base of some 1:32 Chinese-made diecast models for the Iranian market.
- Base Toys – Similar to Hartoys, or Lledo, oo scale or 1:76.
- Bauer Models –
  - Bauer Exclusive – metal die-cast in 1:18 and 1:12 scales.
- BBR Models – Luxury Italian 1:18 & 1:43 scale model manufacturer. Offers both diecast and resin models
- Bburago – Italian, made by the brothers who made Mebetoys and Martoys. Made 1:18 scale diecast popular.
- Beeju – British company making plastic trucks and buses
- Benbros – British diecast of different sizes.
- Best Box – Dutch brand of three-inch diecast models, precursor of Efsi
- Biante – Australian 1:18, 1:43 and 1:64 scale model manufacturer
- Bing German manufacturer of tin-plate models
- Bizarre – Spark model product.
- Blitz Model Tecnica (BMT) – 1:8 IC track radio controlled cars late 80s through 1990s
- Blue-Box – Hong Kong maker of plastic cars and trucks
- BoLink – radio controlled cars
- Bos-Models "Best of Show" – 1:87 & 1:64 1:43 & 1:18 resin car & truck models, owned by the German company : "Model Car World GmbH", made in China
- Boss Bodies – Slot car aftermarket 1:32 scale body manufacturer in New Hampshire, USA
- Box Model – Made by Grassini & Co. Italian manufacturer in the early 1980s of mainly Ferraris that later split & became Bang models & Best models.
- BP – Not 'British Petroleum' but 'Brothers Petersen' in Denmark, made a handful of models in the late 1940s
- Brekina – German manufacturer for highly detailed plastic models of the 1940s – 1970s in 1:87 scale (H0).
- Brimtoy – British maker of larger plastic cars and trucks See also Wells-Brimtoy.
- Brio – Swedish wood toys, but also marketed diecast Saabs and other vehicles.
- Britbus – highly detailed bus models for British market but made in China. 1:76 scale.
- Britains – British manufacturer of soldiers and animals with Land Rovers, Jeeps & farm equipment mixed in.
- Brookfield Collectors Guild – Wisconsin maker of metal and plastic American promotional models.
- Brooklin – Handbuilt 1:43 white metal cars originally made in Brooklin suburb of Toronto, Canada and now made in England (incl. related brands Lansdowne, RobEddie, U.S. Model Mint, International Police, Buick Collection '34–'39).
- Bruce Arnold Models (a.k.a. BAM) – handbuilt 1:43 white metal / resin post-war American cars. Officially licensed by General Motors.
- Bruder – German manufacturer, plastic large trucks, farming and construction models.
- Brumm – Italian manufacturer of die-cast models in 1:43 scale.
- BS (Beuzon et Sordet) – Simple plastic cars from France
- Buby – Argentine maker of many scales.
- Buddy L – Tonka like toys; mostly pressed steel.
- Budgie Toys – diecast cars and trucks made in England. Similar to Matchbox.
- Busch – German manufacturer for plastic models in 1:87 and 1:160

== C ==
- Calsito Models – Dutch model cars
- Capricorn – Italian nitro radio-controlled cars
- Cararama – Mostly 1:43 scale, also HO, made in China by Hongwell.
- Carette – Very early tinplate toys. Germany.
- Carousel 1 – Carousel 1 produced high quality and detailed die cast 1:18 scale Indianapolis 500 Race Cars. From 1998 through 2009, seventy models were released covering the “golden era” of the famous race. Carousel 1 is no longer in business.
- Carrera – Current Austrian manufacturer of 1:43, 1:32, and 1:24 beautifully detailed slot cars, track, and digital control systems.
- Castle Toy – British die-cast manufacturer
- Castline – Makes M2 Machines replicas of US and Japanese cars of the 1950s to 1970s.
- Chad Valley – Die-cast cars and buses made in England since the 1920s.
- Che Zhi – Chinese Brand of diecast cars, usually 1:32 scale.
- Chibi – Plastic copies of Dinky Supertoys made in Argentina
- CF - Hong Kong brand copy to Tomica models.
- Chrono – 1:18 scale cars, mostly of British marques from the 1960s and 1970s. Made in China.
- CIJ – see Compagnie Industrielle du Jouet.
- CKO – see Kellerman – pressed steel German cars and trucks. Dies later acquired by Czech firm Kovap Nachod, and still later, Kaden.
- Classic Carlectables – Manufacturers of Australian Touring Cars and V8 Supercars
- Classic Model Cars (CMC) – German manufacturer of precision high end die-cast collectible model cars and race car transporters in 1:18 and 1:12 scale.
- Classiques CCC – 1:43 scale resin models made in France.
- Classic Model Replicars (CMR) –
- Cle – Name from Clement Gaget. Plastic toy cars and trucks from 1950s – 1970s
- Clifford – Hong Kong maker of plastic toys like the VW Transporter with opening side doors
- CM – Hong Kong maker of London / Hong Kong double decker plastic buses
- CMNL – See Creative Master Northcord ltd.
- Cofalu – Mostly figures and accessories but plastic motorcycles and some vehicles also
- Collectors Classics – Argentine-produced 1:43-scale models of classic American cars (primarily '50s).
- Colourful Model –
- Comando – See Juguetes Joaquin Valero.
- Compagnie Industrielle du Jouet – Compagnie Industrielle du Jouet (CIJ); French die-cast manufacturer, name now brought back by Norev.
- Companion – Russian model car brand from Gelendzhik, making models of Soviet/Russian trucks and buses of plastic (scale 1:43)
- Conquest- Handbuilt 1:43 white metal cars (incl. related brand Madison). Most models made by SMTS. Line discontinued and brought back in 2005.
- Conrad Models – Conrad Modell; German maker of promotional trucks and some cars.
- Contrast Racing – Spanish large scale radio-controlled car
- Corally – Dutch electric radio controlled cars
- Corgi Toys – Introduced in 1956, the first real competition to Dinky Toys and great toy innovator.
- Corgi Classics – Modern Corgi.
- Cox Models – Formerly one of the USA's most respected manufacturers of slot cars. Also model kits.
- Cragstan – Toy distributor of many types of toys, including diecast from Gamda Sabra of Israel marketed as Cragstan Detroit Seniors, and Japanese tinplate and plastic toys.
- Creation Model – Japanese nitro radio-controlled cars, known for the Infinity brand
- Creative Master Northcord Ltd – highly detailed die-cast bus models in 1:76 scale.
- Crescent Toys – British manufacturer of die-cast models, sometimes marketing DCMT toys. Often 1950s & 1960s race cars. Boxes are reminiscent of Italian Mercury with illustrations
- Crown Premiums – Manufacturers of mint die-cast collectibles. Mostly 1:24 scale trucks and custom cars and hot rods.
- Cult Scale Models – 1:18 scale. Made of the best materials, by most skillful artists and in limited quantities.
- Cursor Models – Cursor Modell; German manufacturer of diecast and plastic promotional models and 1:43 models for the Mercedes museum.

== D ==
- Danbury Mint – Intricate 1:24 scale die casts. Come with titles and documents, though not always as good as some resin makers. Made in China. Costing around $100.00.
- Danhausen – German models during the 1970s, most made by other producers, became Paul's Model Art and Minichamps.
- Davis & Giovanni –
- DCMT – made diecast Lone Star Toys in England.
- Del Prado – Manufacturer of so-called Kiosk cars, cars you buy with a magazine as part of a series. Often they are 1:43 scale line and produced by Universal Hobbies.
- Delta Systems – US radio-controlled car
- Democratic Brand – a line of Chinese diecast
- Design Studio – a line of Motor City USA.
- Desormeaux – French manufacturer of 1:43 die casts.
- Detail Cars –
- Diapet – Japanese diecast maker, made Yonezawa.
- Dickie Toys – More generic diecasts of the Simba-Dickie Group.
- Difference Models - made by French former Dinky France molds maker Claude thibivilliers, Difference was the Rolls-Royce modelmaker. Elegance was the brand for Cadillac's.
- Dinky Toys – the first brand of post WWII 1:43 scale toy car to be collected widely. Introduced 1934, with production stopping in 1982. Name briefly resurrected by Matchbox in late 1980's.
- DiP Models – Russian 1:43 metal and resin model manufacturer.
- DISM – A division of Aoshima producing high-quality diecast range of Japanese cars from the 1970s and 1980s, in 1:43 and 1:24 scales.
- DNA Collectibles – Swiss 1:18 and 1:43 resin model manufacturer.
- Doyusha – Japanese plastic, diecast and radio control model manufacturer.
- Dragon Models - A Hong-Kong based manufacturer of plastic model kits, diecast models and military action figures. Founded in 1987.
- Dubray – or J.M. Dubray or JMD – French producer of built and kit resin Peugeots and Citroens in 1:43 scale. One of the earliest specialists in resin, appearing in the '70s.
- Dulcop – Simple plastic cars and trucks from Bologna, Italy
- Durham Classics – Canadian Handbuilt 1:43 white metal cars, and often, liveried trucks. Complete name is Durham Classics Automotive Miniatures.
- Dust & Glory – Handbuilt models of pre-WW1 American Race Cars.
- Dux – German plastic and diecast, see Autodux.
- Dynamic Models –

== E ==
- Eagle Collectibles – Later version of Eagle's Race. Eagle named later dropped.
- Ebbro – Japanese 1:43 scale models made by Miniature Model Planning (MMP).
- Edison Giacattoli – In the 1970s, mostly diecast planes made in Italy, later European model cars made in China.
- Efsi Toys – Matchbox sized diecast cars and trucks, successor of Best Box. Say "Made in Holland" on bases. Some Efsis made by Auto Pilen of Spain
- EKO – former Spanish producer of 1:87 scale plastic models, partly using Anguplas moulds of the 1960s.
- Eldon – American manufacturer of HO, 1:32 and 1:24 scale slot cars and sets. Also a variety of plastic toy cars and trucks.
- Elekon – Russian factory in Kazan, mainly producing electric couplers and remote measuring equipment for civilian and military technics, but also produce 1:43 scale models of older Soviet vehicles, mainly trucks.
- Elegance Models – Resin kits and handbuilts by Claude Thibivilliers.
- Eligor Models – Swiss/French diecast model maker, mostly in 1:43 scale, made by Hobbycar, started by Louis B. Surber.
- Elvip / Elliniki Viomichania Paichnidion – Greek plastic toys, some similar to German Gama
- EMC – Highend 1:43 scale car models produced since 1986 and produced in Kiev, Ukraine.
- Emek – Finnish plastic trucks in 1:25; also took over some Stahberg 1:22 scale production.
- ERA Diecast
- Ertl Company – American company from Iowa – mostly tractors, but later took on about everything else.
- Espewe – Also called VEB Plasticart. East German state plastic model producer (VEB being "factory of the people"). Many former Sam Toys castings from Italy
- Estetyka – Polish producer mainly of classic cars in plastic usually about 1:50 scale
- Esval –
- Exact Detail Replicas –
- Ex-El Products – Company reproducing Jo-Han promos during the 1980s.
- EXOTO - Maker of high-end 1:18 and limited 1:10 Diecast models.

== F ==
- F & F – Small plastic cars from Dayton, Ohio in the 1950s & early 1960s
- Fador
- Fahr(T)raum
- Fairfield Mint
- Fairylite – Hong Kong maker of plastic toys like the Pickford's moving truck
- Fastlane – Model car brand of Toys "R" Us.
- Ferrero – Italian chocolate company, in the late 1970s scaled down 1:87 scale Wikings to about 1:120 to fit inside Kinder Surprise chocolate eggs. Most models were made in Hong Kong. Some were original models, and not copies of Wiking cars.
- FG Modellsport – German large scale radio-controlled car
- First Response Replicas – American diecast brand specialized in 1:43 scale police cars, now acquired by Greenlight Collectibles
- Fisher Body Co. – The same company that made real car bodies also made Kingsbury Toys.
- Fly Slot (aka Fly) – Spanish manufacturer of highly detailed 1:32 slot cars.
- France Jouets or FJ – French plastic and diecast maker similar to Corgi, CIJ, or Tekno
- Francorchamps – Belgian maker of Formula One race car models, possibly for sale at the Spa track
- Franklin Mint – Intricate die-casts, primarily 1:24 scale.
- French Dinky – Dinky line made in France.
- Frontiart Model Co., Ltd. – Model car maker located in China and produces mostly 1:43, 1:18, resin models, some with opening features.
- Fujimi – Japanese plastic model manufacturer, many scales, since the 1960s. Fujimi Resin Collection are handbuilts in the hundreds of dollars.
- Funmate – Japanese plastic toy and promotional maker.
- Funrise – More toy-like, many models of many sizes, often very creative.
- Furuta – Japanese maker of detailed plastic toys (including model cars), sold inside chocolate eggs.
- FYP Expensive and highly detailed White Metal models, specifically models by Rolls-Royce and Bentley.

== G ==
- GainCorp Products (GCD) - a Chinese brand that mostly produced 1:64 cars & trucks.
  - Diecast Team Models (DCT)
- Galanite – Swedish brand of 1:43 scale soft plastic toy cars similar to Tomte Laerdal
- Galgo – Argentine diecast, mostly 1:43 scale.
- Gama Toys – Historic German producer of tin and later diecast and plastic models, of all scales.
- Gamda-Koor "Sabra" – Israeli diecast, sold as Cragstan Detroit Seniors in the US. Many were previously Corgi toolings.
- Gasquy-Septoy – Belgian manufacturer of die-cast toys, dating from the late 1940s
- Gate - See Gateway
- Gateway - Former name of AUTOart. Also associated to UT models. Formerly associated with Paul's Model Art & Minichamps.
- Gay Toys – American manufacturer of plastic toys, some fairly authentic.
- GE Fabbri ltd. –
- GeGe – Named for founder Germaine Giroud of France. Realistic remote control plastic cars in the 1960s
- Georgia Marketing & Promotions (GMP)
- Gescha – German maker of toys and later truck promotionals, both pre- and post-war.
- Gilbow –
- Gilmark – US maker of plastic toys
- Giodi – Italian 1:66 and 1:18 scale diecast.
- Gisima – Spanish manufacturer of die-cast models in 1:64 and larger scales.
- Goldvarg – 1990s Argentine manufacturer of 1:43 scale white metal models of American Cars from the '40s and '50s.
- Gonio – Artfully done detailed pressed steel military vehicles in 1:24 scale from the former Czechoslovakia. Gonio dies later taken over by Kaden.
- Great American Dream Machines (GADM) – Handbuilt 1:43 white metal models of mid-20th century Detroit showcars most often made by SMTS.
- GreenLight – 1:18, 1:43 and 1:64 scale diecast with a central focus on film and television dual-licensed items.
- Griffin Models – Bulgarian manufacturer of white metal models, fairly authentic vintage Saabs. 1:43 scale.
- GT Spirit –
- Guiloy – Spanish manufacturer of die-cast models in 1:64, 1:43, 1:24 and 1:18 scales.
- Guisval – Spanish manufacturer of die-cast models in 1:64 and 1:43 scales.
- Gunze Sangyo – Japanese plastic model manufacturer. One series is 1:32 scale American cars from the 1950s.
- Guri car – Portuguese brand of diecast auto miniatures; This brand belonged to Poliguri.

== H ==
- H.A.R.M. Racing – German large scale remote-controlled car
- Hammer – Germany company making plastic toy cars, buses and VW vans
- Hartoys AHL – Precision diecast trucks made in China, reminiscent of Lledo.
- Hasbro – Now owns Tonka. Many different series. Battery operated slot cars called Record Breakers.
- Hasegawa – Japanese plastic model manufacturer.
- Hawk – Classic American automobile and beatnik kits.
- HB Racing (formerly Hot Bodies) – radio-controlled cars, split from Hobby Products International following 2016 bankruptcy of HPI, owned by Neidhart SA
- Héco Modèles or Heco Miniatures – or NIKKI – handbuilt 1:43 resin figures, dioramas, and cars (incl. various related brands such as Challange), specializing in French scenes and cars of the classic streamlined era
- Heller SA – French / German producer of kits.
- Herpa – German 1:87 (HO) and 1:120 scale (TT) plastic. Both kits and assembled. In the 1990s some diecast 1:43 and 1:64 scale cars.
- Hi Speed – Diecast maker of old Fire Engines – cars too. See High Speed below.
- High Speed – Hong Kong based maker. Diecast series fire engines and '50s and '60s cars for Reader's Digest Club mail order (about 1:55 scale). Also more high end 1:43 scale diecast LeMans racers like Porsche 904.
- HK – Presumably, "Hong Kong". Maker of plastic copies of Corgi toys
- Hirobo – radio controlled cars, produced for short period
- HoBao – Taiwanese 1:8 R/C buggies
- Hobby Japan - A Japanese model car brand that also publishing books, magazines, light novels, games, and other collectibles.
- Holland Oto – Netherlands company taking over production of Efsi in the 1980s. Diecast models with plastic parts
- Homco - manufacturer.
- Hongwell – manufacturer of Cararama brand.
- Hornby Hobbies – Known mostly for trains, has owned many diecast cars, models, and slot car systems along the way.
- Hot Wheels – American brand of Matchbox-like 3 inches models of small diecast custom, sports, and racing cars by Mattel.
- HP – Plastic toys made in Hong Kong
- HPI Racing (formerly Hobby Products International) – 1:43 & 1:18 scale diecast. Often Japanese vehicles, owned by Ripmax.
- Hubley Manufacturing Company – American producer of metal kits, diecast cars, and plastic kits and promotional models.
- Husky Toys – Corgi's smaller line that competed with Matchbox. Name brought back in the 2000s with no connection to Corgi for tourism trade of Austin black cabs and UK police cars.

== I ==
- ICIS – Italian brand of plastic toys
- Ideal Models – original name for Jo-Han promotionals.
- Ideal Toy Company – Now defunct American toy company that manufactured and sold toys, slot cars, etc.
- IG-Model – See Ignition_Model. Aka TK.company.
- Ignition Model – Made in China. Aka IG-Model & TK.company.
- Igra models – Plastic model maker from Czechoslovakia similar to Minialuxe specializing in classic Czech makes.
- Ilario – French maker of high-quality hand-built 1:43-scale models of classic luxury cars – included related brands; Chromes, Contact, Nickel. Also produces limited production 1:18 scale models under the same Ilario name.
- Illustra – British White Metal manufacturer, recently resurrected the Minimarque Range. Also made models for Highway Travelers.
- Interco - Hong Kong brand copy to Tomica models.
- Imai Science – Japanese model kits, cars, motorcycles, TV vehicles.
- IMC (Industro-Motive Corporation) – US manufacturer kits, notably Ford products, often with opening hoods, doors, even opening hidden headlights. Bought by Hawk Models in early seventies, then purchased by Testors, later merged with Lindberg, owned by parent company RPM, now part of Lindberg again.
- Imperial Toys – Hong Kong manufacturer of a variety of toys, including diecast of lower quality, but sometimes clever selection.
- Impy – line of Lone Star toys made by DCMT.
- Ingap – Italian manufacturer of mostly HO scale
- Injectaplastic – French Citroen CX wagons and a few other plastic models in the 1970s
- Inno Models - Premium line of 1:64 and 1:18 scale models that are mostly modified JDM vehicles, with some European vehicles in the mix.
- Intech – Taiwanese manufacturer of remote control offroad vehicles.
- Irwin – Plastic toys and cars made in the USA
- iScale – 1:18 & 1:43 scale models.
- IST Models –
- Italeri – Italian aircraft, military and civil kit manufacturer. Cars and trucks, too.
- Ites – Czech maker of larger Tatra, Jeep and other vehicles.
- Ivy Model - fine detailed 1:18 scale resin models made in China. Associated brand: Merit.
- Ixo – part of a conglomerate of brands from the Far East, with Altaya, Atlas, De Agostini, del Prado, IST, and Yat Ming. Connection to earlier Vitesse?

== J ==
- J's Models –
- Jada Toys – Modern hip diecast cars with bling! In various scales.
- Jadi Modelcraft – 1:18 scale diecast (like a Triumph Stag). Paragon Models is one of their lines.
- JConcepts – made its only 1:10 radio-controlled off-road buggy (BJ4)
- JEP (Jouets de Paris) – Mostly plastic toys and cable control cars in the "Minia" line
- Jimson – Plastic toys made in Hong Kong
- JMC Racing – French 1:8 radio-controlled buggies
- JNF – German tin toys and later plastic
- Joal – Sometimes called 'Joal Compact'. Diecast from Spain since the 1980s, mainly 1:50.
- Jo-Han – American producer of plastic promotional models and kits.
- Johnny Lightning – Hot Wheels like cars whether made by early Topper or Playing Mantis. After being owned by Tomy, as of January 2016, owned by Round 2 LLC (makers of Auto World).
- Jouef – French manufacturer of slot cars in 1:36 scale, some of which were also produced and sold in the UK by Mettoy-Corgi under the Playcraft brand.
  - Jouefevolution – Jouef's 1990s line of diecast cars in 1:43 and 1:18 scale in bright yellow boxes.
- Jordan Products – former American producer of H0/H0n3/H0n30 scale plastic vehicles kits for model railroads named Highway Miniatures
- Joy Toy – Prolific Greek producer of plastic cars and trucks
- JUC – Formerly JEC.
- Juguetes Joaquin Valero / Comando – Plastic toy cars from Spain
- Juguetes y Estufes SA / JYE / Jyesa – Spanish maker of tin and plastic cars
- JQ Products – 1:8 off-road buggies

== K ==
- Kaden models – Czech firm making mainly Škoda and Tatra models. Early plastic toys were ex-Politoys moulds. Took over Kovap Nachod (former CKO Kellerman models) and Gonio
- Kamtec - British company who make kits, bodies, wheels and spares mainly for 1:12 scale carpet circuit and oval race cars.
- Kami Motors - South Korean Die-Cast Manufacturer founded in 2018. formerly known as Mica and made GM Korea and Renault Samsung models. Nowadays usually make 1:35 scale Hyundai, Kia models.
- Karpan – Spanish plastic toy maker from Ford Fiestas with cardboard interior to ride-on vehicles for toddlers
- Kawada Model
- KDN – Short for Kovodružstvo Náchod, later called Kaden models, see above.
- Kellerman (model cars) – German quality pressed steel cars and trucks, later taken over by Czech firm Kovap.
- Kenna Models British Manufacturer of 1:43 White Metal. Defunct. Morrises, etc.
- Kenner – Variety of plastic & diecast vehicles, particularly the Hot Wheels-like Fast 111s. Notable also are their plastic, solar powered 1:20 scale AMX and Charger.
- Kibri – Plastic 1:87 scale vehicles / kits. Especially nice are the military vehicles.
- Kinsmart – makes pull-back 1:43, 1:24, 1:64 scaled cars, some pretty detailed
- Kingmaker Coal – British company, mainly models of British cars, trains and trucks. All models are made from British Coal.
- K. K. Sakura – Japanese diecast maker in about 1:40 scale featuring single molded bodies all chromed then masked and painted to reveal chrome bumpers and grilles.
- KK-Scale – German based diecast model car brand making road and race cars in 1:12 and 1:18 scale. Mostly sealed models apart from their 1:12 models which have opening doors. Founded by Modelissimo.
- Kleeware – British company making licensed Ideal Toy products
- K-Line – Different scales/makes of cars like Welly made for Railroad sets.
- KM Group (aka KM Racing) – Nitro radio-control cars, first Hong Kong brand to win IFMAR Worlds in 2012
- Korris Products Inc. – American cheaper plastic 1:25 scale toys and kits.
- Kosuge – Japanese pressed tin maker. Named for Matsuzo Kosuge former founder of Marusan.
- Kovap Náchod – Took over German firm Kellerman CKO and taken over later by Kovodružstvo Náchod / Kaden
- Kovodružstvo Náchod – Name of Czech firm shortened to KDN, and later Kaden models. Later associated with Kovap Náchod
- Kurt Becker KG – small German manufacturer from Berlin which built a 1:43 diecast model of the Auto Union Type A racing car in 1947/48.
- Kyosho – Japanese diecast and radio control manufacturer.

== L ==
- La Mini Miniera – French race cars.
- Laguna Beach Creations - 1:43 white metal
- Lanard Toys – Mostly cord action plastic toy cars and trucks, many very realistic.
- Lansdowne Models – the branch of Brooklin Models which deals specifically with British marques, as opposed to American cars.
- Lapin – Plastic toys and cars in the early 1950s
- Laro – French radio-controlled cars.
- Laudoracing-models – Italian resin model car manufacturer.
- LB Holdings Company Ltd. – Owner of LB Performance, LB Works & Liberty Walk.
- LB Performance – See LB Holdings Company Ltd.
- LB Works – See LB Holdings Company Ltd.
- LCD Models – China-based company that has been developing products for various brands including 1:12, 1:32, 1:43 scales. Recently LCD Model has been building their own line of scale models including 1:26, 1:72, and 1:18 scales.
- Lectricar Racing – early era electric radio-controlled cars
- Legend – 1:43 scale diecast, name used first with JouefEvolution, then by Universal Hobbies.
- Lego – Matchbox sized cars in the late 1950s through the 1960s
- Lemeco – Rare early 1950s diecast cars and military vehicles made in Sweden
- Lemezarugyar – Hungarian plastic toys
- Lenyko / Geno-Toys, Swedish firm making a Volvo PV444 L (1957) model worthy of being a promotional (Force 2002, pp. 32, 99), factory situated in Gothenburg, burned down in 1963. Geno stood for Gösta Norén whereas Lenyko (same owner) stood for Leksaker (toys), Nyheter (News) and Kortvaror (haberdashery), using the first two letters of each word.
- Lesney – Original company that produced Matchbox. The name comes from a combination of the first names of founders Leslie and Rodney Smith.
- Liberty Classics, Inc. – Spin-off of Ertl – made many pickup trucks. Made SpecCast line.
- Liberty Walk – See LB Holdings Company Ltd.
- Lincoln International – Plastic toy cars made in Hong Kong
- Linda Toys – Hong Kong maker of plastic toys
- Lindberg Products – American maker of plastic kits and some promotional models. Skokie, Illinois.
- Lines Bros – Makers of Minic and Tri-Ang, which also made Spot-On Models.
- Lintoy – Makers of diecast airplanes and vehicles. Various airlines / military fighter jets and propeller aircraft. Plus, a few cars and a toy tool set (1970s). Various knock offs can be found of the airplanes. Also packaged under the Bachmann toy line and Corgi Toys.
- Lion Car – Also known as Lion Toys. Dutch diecast truck and car producer
- Lionel – Iconic American toy train company creating the first slot cars (1912), an HO line in the 1960s, and 1:50 scale trucks (made by...who?) about 1990. Also simple plastic toy cars and racing cars that ran on railroad tracks.
- Lledo (Days Gone, Vanguards) – It's the name Odell backwards. Former designer of Matchbox Models of Yesteryear. Product line now absorbed into Corgi
- Lone Star Toys – British diecast cars, one product of tool maker DCMT.
- Looksmart Models – Sister brand of MR Collection Models.
- Losi (aka Team Losi, TLR) – American manufacturer of remote control vehicles
- LS (company) – 1:32 scale kits, 1:43 scale cars with dioramas, like Lamborghini Jota.
- Lucky Step Collectibles – LS Collectibles
- Lucky Toys – Hong Kong producer of plastic toy cars
- Luso Toys – Portuguese diecast producer of 1:43 cars.
- Luxor – Plastic toys from the Netherlands
- Luxury Diecast – Chinese but made for NY company, among other things 2009 Cadillac U.S. presidential limousine in 1:43 scale.

== M ==
- M2 Machines – 1:24 and 1:64 scale diecast models of American cars and trucks of the 1950s, '60s, and '70s. Also includes Nissan/Datsun and Volkswagen models from 1960s and 1970s. Made by Castline.
- MAE - Model Auto Emporium (Montreal Canada) 1:43 white metal models.
- Ma Collection – Swiss-owned maker of hand-built 1:43-scale models, primarily of classic French cars.
- Maclovell Huon Pine Racing Cars – Tasmanian hand-carved wood models
- Madison (see Conquest Models). Most models made by SMTS. Some made for Fa. Daimler House in the Netherlands.
- Maisto – American-owned, Thailand made conglomerate of May Cheong and May Tat. Models have excellent detail for price, with most scales covered.
- Majorette – German brand owned by Simba Dickie Group, known for their Matchbox-like 3 inches model vehicles. Originally from France. Newer models are made in Thailand.
- Mak's – Hong Kong producer of plastic cars and trucks
- Make Up - Japanese maker of resin car models in 1:64, 1:43 and 1:18 scales.
- Mandarin – Matchbox sized cars made in Singapore.
- Mansory Collection –
- Mardave – British radio-controlled cars
- Märklin – Classic German manufacturer in various scales. Known for trains.
- Marks – German manufacturer in 1:87 and 1:160
- Marqueart – Suppliers of high-quality, hand-built 1:43 scale model cars.
- Martino Models – Handbuilt white metal models made by Marty Martino.
- Martoys – Larger 1:24 scale line made 1975–1976, then became Bburago.
- Marusan – Japanese plastic, tinplate, and diecast toys, founded by Matsuzo Kosuge.
- Marushin – Japan, diecast cars, airplanes, and other toys.
- Louis Marx and Company – American toymaker, usually plastic, some diecast zamac, made '48 Hudson promotional.
- Matchbox – American brand owned by Mattel. Originally, the producer of small diecast vehicles from Hackney, London, England. Later expanded to additional lines such as Models of Yesteryear, Major Packs, King Size, Sky-Busters. Later owned by Universal Toys, then Tyco, and now owned by Mattel.
- Matrix – Dutch-owned producer of high-quality resin model cars, primarily 1:43 scale.
- Mattel – American toy company. Mainly Hot Wheels and Matchbox in various forms – other vehicles earlier than that.
- MCW-Models –
- McGregor – Mexican reproductions of Italian Politoys, that ads called 'McGregor Politoys'. Some plastic models looked like reproductions from the French Safir.
- Mebetoys – Italian 1:43 scale producer started by Besana brothers who later started Martoys and Bburago.
- Meboto – Crude Turkish reproductions of 1:43 scale Italian Ediltoys.
- MeMod - Swiss kits for Cadillac 59 Vitesse models rebuilding to a sedan or a Fleetwood 60 S, also 1955 Coupe de Ville.
- Meko Models – Started in 2005. Fine handbuilt resin models in 1:43, 1:18 & 1:12 scale.
- Mercury – Italian 1:43 scale manufacturer.
- Metaloplastika-MP Sabac-Yugolasvia 1:43, 1:24 and 1:32 scale during the communist era and after it. Briefly make some Burago clones of slightly lower quality.
- Metosul – Oldest Portuguese diecast manufacturer, from the same company as Osul plastics. Name often seen on boxes as MetOsul. Originally based in Espinho (outside of Oporto); most models in 1:43 scale, but also 1:50. Some models apparently Dinky tooling like Atlantean Bus.
- Mettoy – Manufacturer of many different kinds of trucks and cars in Great Britain. Gave rise to Corgi. Also made first HO slot car line (Playcraft Electric Highways), which was later manufactured and developed by Aurora.
- MG Model Cars -
- Micro Machines – Tiny plastic cars about 1.5 inches made by Lewis Galoob.
- Micro Models – New Zealand maker of Australian marketed vehicles.
- Micro-Racing – 1:8 off-road buggies
- Midgetoy – Tootsietoy-like single body castings late '60s early '70s – Rockford, IL.
- Mikansue – English White Metal models of American cars of the 1940s through 1960s.
- Milestone Models – South African 1:43 scale white metal models, mainly of Chrysler products.
- MileziM – Spark model product.
- Milton Mini Auto – Corgi and Dinky reproductions and other toys made in India.
- Minex – British, 1:76 plastic car models.
- Minialuxe – French precision plastic models, similar to Cursor or early Brumm.
- Miniature Model Planning or MMP – Japanese makers of Ebbro.
- Miniatures du Mont-blanc – French manufacturer 1:43 (Berliet, Chevrolet, Saviem, Renault, Citroën, Jeep...)
- Minic – Tin models made by Triang in Britain, 1930s. Plastic cars and trucks through the 1960s
- Minichamps – German-owned manufacturer of die-cast zamac or resin models. Many different cars of all types. High quality models, originally 1:43, now also in other scales (especially 1:18). Also makes Motorcycles. Owned by PMA (Paul's Model Art GmbH). Formerly associated with Gateway Models, Gate, AUTOart & UT Models.
- Minicraft – British maker of plastic kits.
- Minikraft - South Korean brand usually made Hyundai, Kia, Genesis models. 1:18 scale models.
- Mini-GT - TSM Sister brand. 1:64 scale models.
- MiniMarque 43 – handbuilt 1:43 white metal cars.
- Miniroute – 1:43 scale resin handbuilt. Made in France.
- Mira – Spanish manufacturer of die-cast models in 1:64, 1:43, and 1:18 scales. Makes Carmania.
- Miracle House – An Aoshima brand.
- Mitsuwa Model – Miniature pull back model cars
- Modarri – Generic toy cars with the patented steering system.
- Model Car Group (MCG) – Sealed 1:18 diecast replicas of old F1 cars, old European cars and old American cars.
- Model Factory Hiro – Japanese resin kit manufacturer. Often F1 cars in 1:12 scale.
- Model Icons –
- Model Power – Usually 1:87 scale HO trucks and cars.
- Model Products Corporation – See MPC.
- Model Racing Car – French 1:8 off-road buggies.
- Model Workshop – Handbuilt models.
- Modern Products – A company that made earlier Morestone toys. See Budgie Toys for detail and sources.
- Moebius Models – Reissues some Aurora kits.
- Mondo Motors – Mostly Italian reboxings of Chinese brands like Motormax.
- Monogram models – American producer of plastic model kits, now under Revell Group of Hobbico.
- Mont-Blanc – French tin plastic toy and promotional maker for Citroen 1950s-1970s based in Romilly, France
- Morestone – British diecast models similar to early Matchbox. This is the name before they became Budgie Toys.
- Motor City USA – Expensive handbuilt 1:43 white metal cars (incl. related brands Design Studio, American Models, USA Models).
- Motormax – Chinese producer of a wide variety of different budget scale diecast models, 1:64 scale to 1:12 scales. A descendant of Zylmex and Redbox.
- MPC – American producer of promotional models and kits in plastic.
- MR Collection Models – Italian hand made model car manufacturer in scale, 1:8, 1:12, 1:18 and 1:43. Mother brand of Looksmart models.
- Muovo – Finnish plastic car maker, about 1:50 scale.
- Muky – Argentine reproductions of certain earlier Hot Wheels dies.
- Muscle Machines - Tooned 1:64 versions of mostly old muscle cars but formerly made 1:18 and 1:24 diecast in the past. Now owned by May Cheong Group. (Maisto)
- MYSP Works - Since 2020 serving with "Made to Order" 100% hand-made model miniature cars by MY Sthitha Pragna. Offers in 1:25, 1:16 and 1:12 scale ratios.

== N ==
- Nacoral Intercars – Diecast metal and plastic vehicles from Zaragoza, Spain. Some dies borrowed from Belgian Sablon.
- Neo Scale Models – German-owned (formerly Dutch) manufacturer of high quality resin models, mostly 1:43 scale. Often Saabs, but many cars and trucks.
- New Bright – American manufacturer of radio-controlled cars, boats, and trains as well as non-RC free-rolling vehicles
- New-Ray – Hong Kong manufacturer of die-cast cars, motorbikes, trucks. Early offerings were toy-like while offerings circa 2012 have a precision promotional quality.
- NFIC – Hong Kong maker of plastic double deck buses and other toys
- Nichimo – Japanese plastic kits – 1960s to 1980s.
- Nikko R/C – Originally tinplate toys. Contemporary plastic remote control cars, usually about 1:24 scale.
- Ninco – Spanish maker of 1:32 slot cars, track and digital control equipment
- Norev – French manufacturer of models in 1:64, 1:43, 1:18 and 1:87 scales. Initially plastic, though now Diecast. Circa 2010 now has brought back makers CIJ, Spot-On, and supposedly, JRD. Newer models made in China.
- Norscot - American manufacturers of diecast trailer trucks.
- Novacar – Portuguese producer of Matchbox size cars; acquired by Majorette.
- Novoexport – Russian export organization for Russian diecast.
- NP (Norddeutsche Plastikfabrik) – German brand of 1:43 scale soft plastic toy cars
- Nylint – Tonka like trucks of mostly pressed steel or plastic.
- Nyrhinen Ky – Finnish 1:22 scale plastic promotional producer.
- NZG – NZG Modell; German diecast maker of promotional trucks and some cars.

== O ==
- OK – Hong Kong manufacturer of plastic toy cars
- One43 – Collectible limited edition fine scale model cars in 1:43 scale
- Onyx – Portuguese Minibri's 1:43 line of Indy and other racing cars started about 1988.
- Osul – Tinplate, plastic and some diecast. Osul was an old Portuguese brand of plastic toys and other celuloid and plastic objects; Metosul (because of the contracted name – often seen as 'MetOsul') was a brand, for zamac toys, of the same company. They were both from Espinho, Portugal.
- Otaki Model Toy Company – Defunct Japanese plastic model manufacturer from the 1960s to 1980s.
- OttO Mobile – Mostly 1:18 scale French makes in resin.
- Oxford Diecast – British company – 1:18, 1:43, 1:50, 1:72, 1:76, 1:87 and N Scale (British 1:148).

== P ==
- Palitoy – Rather simple plastic cars made in Britain
- Pantheon –
- Paradcar – Paradcar manufactures resin models in France.
- Paragon Models – A line from Jadi Modelcraft.
  - Para64 is a scaled down version.
- Parma International (also Parma/PSE), slot cars
- Pathfinder – British manufacturer of 1:43 scale White Metal models of British cars from the 1940s to the 1970s.
- Paudi Model – Nissan Infiniti 1:18 and 1:43 scale die-cast models.
- Paul's Model Art – aka PMA. Formerly Danhausen, makes Minichamps, purchased AMR. Also associated to UT models. Formerly associated with Gateway Models, Gate, AUTOart & UT Models.
- PB Racing – British manufacturer of radio-controlled cars, active 1971–c1990s.
- Paya Spanish tin toys and later plastic
- Peako - Highend 1:18 and 1:43 model car manufacturer.
- Penguin – British manufacturer of plastic toy cars
- Penn Line – American model train manufacturer briefly producing 1:52 slot sets endorsed by A. J. Foyt
- Penny – Matchbox sized cars made by Polistil.
- Pepe – Plastic taxis and other cars and vehicles
- Picco Micromotori – 1:8 IC track radio controlled cars in 1990s but known primarily as a glowplug engine manufacturer
- Piko – East German toys previously called Anker
- Pino B&D - South Korean Die-Cast Manufacturer supplied Hyundai-Kia 1:38 Welly Die-casts. Also made 1:24 G4 Rexton, Nissan, Volvo, Ford Die-Cast.
- Plasticos Albacete / PA – Spanish plastic toy car maker
- Plasticville – US plastic scenes, but also cars and trucks
- Playart – Hong Kong manufacturer of Matchbox sized diecast.
- Playcraft – British Toy company once owning Corgi and Aurora. See Mettoy.
- Pocher Model Cars – Made in Torino, Italy. Famous for its large sized (1:8), highly detailed car kits. Also naval guns and cannon models.
- Polfi Toys – Greek plastic and diecast toy maker. Many scales.
- Policar – Italian manufacturer of 1:32 slot cars and accessories.
- Poliguri – Portuguese manufacturer of toys and diecast cars, produced the brand name Guri car.
- Polistil – Italian (later name for Politoys)
  - Politoys – Italian (earlier name of Polistil)
- PR – French diecast manufacturer. Odd vans and promotional trucks.
- Praline - Scale 87 from Germany, at first die-cast/metal models scale 43, overtaken in the nineties by Busch, later plastic models only.
- Precision Miniatures – originally 1:43 white metal models, fused with Motor City USA; later 1:18 scale models.
- Premier Models – American plastic producer of kits, mainly from the 1950s and 1960s.
- Premium ClassiXXs -
- Premium X - IXO sister brand.
- Presu – East German plastic remote control cars with excellent detail
- Processed Plastics – Plastic toy cars, trucks and airplanes from USA
- Product Miniatures Company (PMC) – American promotional model maker from 1947 until about 1965. Mostly Chevrolets.
- Progetto K – Italian diecast (originally resin) of mostly Italian cars. Similar to Brumm.
- Projecto Rallye 43 – Portugal Rally and Dakar Rally Raid Hand Built Resin Models.
- Protar, mostly Italian racing cars, absorbed into Italeri, also larger metal kits sometimes 1:12 scale.
- Provence Moulage – Originally handbuilt 1:43 resin kits, made in France. Often show or concept cars. Line now owned by Norev. Now diecast?
- Pyro – American plastic kit producer in the early 1960s. Later taken over by Life-Like.

== Q ==
- QuarterMile – Handbuilt 1:43 scale models of American dragsters.
- Quartzo – 1:18 & 1:43 scale diecast racing model line of Portuguese Vitesse.
- Quiralu – French manufacturer of the early 1960s of 1:43 models. New castings in the 1980s–1990s (see below).
- Quiralu Re-editions – Made by Louis B. Surber.

== R ==
- RaCar – early era radio-controlled cars
- Racing Champions – Now part of RC2 with Ertl, made American muscle cars and racing cars, mostly in 1:64 scale. RC2 was sold to Takara Tomy in 2011, and in 2016 Round 2 LLC (makers of Auto World) has purchased the Racing Champions brand and permission to use some older Ertl toolings (but not the Ertl name).
- Radar – Portuguese plastic toys
- Radiosistemi – known for the Crono series of radio-controlled cars
- Realtoy – Chinese diecast model producer that makes 1:24, 1:32, 1:40, 1:43 and most notably 1:60 scale models.
- Real-X – Hong Kong manufacturer of very detailed 1:72 scale adult collectable model cars. Jewelled lights are a feature. Produces many Japanese sporting and performance vehicles.
- Record Breakers: World of Speed – A Hasbro line from the late 1980s to early 1990s.
- Redbox – Was Zylmex, became Motormax.
- Remco – Mostly Tonka-like toys and trucks.
- Renwal – Plastic generic vehicles in the 1940s and 1950s. Also many classic and more detailed 1:48 scale "Collector's Showcase Series" kits in the 1960s.
- Revell – American model kit producer owned by Hobbico.
- Revell AG Germany – Former subsidiary of American Revell, now a separate company.
- Revival International – Italian manufacturer of highly detailed 1:20 metal and plastic models.
- Rextoys – 1:43 diecast French/Swiss producer of mostly 1930s era cars.
- Ribeirinho – Plastic toy cars and trucks
- Ricko – Hong Kong Chinese manufacturer in 1:87 scale, having own brand "Ricko" and producing models for "Brekina" and "Starmada".
- Rico – Spanish tin and plastic toy maker set up by ex-Paya employees
- Rietze Automodelle – German (Altdorf, Nuremberg) manufacturer of plastic models mainly in 1:87 scale (H0), buses/coaches, cars, vans, trucks, some 1:160 scale (N gauge). Since 1983.
- Rio – Italian manufacturer of 1:43 scale classic models, 1900–1960.
- RO Models Workshop – Czech manufacturer of trucks and military vehicles. Many Tatras.
- Road Champs – Diecast in 1:64 and 1:43 scale of mostly American cars of the 1950s and 1960s.
- Roadmaster – name of Lone Star toys made by DCMT.
- Robbe – Founded in 1924, a company from Grebenhain, Germany, specialising in radio control model aircraft, boats and cars in kit form. Bankrupt in 2015.
- Robeddie – Defunct Brooklin line making Swedish Volvos and Saabs.
- Roche Products International – Hong Kong radio-controlled car brand, 2016 IFMAR Worlds champion
- Roco – Austrian manufacturer of model railways, and early plastic toys. Similar to Herpa. Mostly 1:87 scale (H0) and known for military vehicles
- Roskopf (RMM) – German manufacturer in 1:100 scale plastic military vehicles (1960s/1970s), 1980s to 1990s 1:87 scale (H0) plastic models, mostly German, French and Swiss trucks and buses. Was sold to Wiking.
- Rosso Corporation – Short-lived high end plastic scale model manufacturer from Japan, 1:43, 1:24, 1:8 scale. Kabushiki-gaisha Rosso was a Japanese scale model manufacturer specializing in plastic scale kits and pre-assembled model cars. Rosso only made models in 1992 – for approximately one year.
- Les Rouliers – French Matchbox-sized cars in metal. Some plastic cars also
- RyM – Plastic toys from Argentina

== S ==
- S & J Models – British Whitemetal Kit and ready built Rover SDI and Sierra XR4i Kits mid- to late 1980s. Total Production about 800 models.
- Sablon – Belgian maker of diecast in 1:43 known for bad chemical reactions of plastic wheels to rubber tires
- Sabra - (Israel) 1:43 diecast metal (distributed by Cragstan) sold in clear plastic with red end door container resembling a garage.
- Safir – French producer, diecast metal early, then plastic veteran cars, and plastic Grand Prix cars in the 1970s.
- Saico – 1:32 & 1:64 model car maker in 2000s.
- Sam Toys – Italian firm in 1950s that later were made as East German Espewe
- Sanwa – Japanese radio-controlled car (for a short period), now famous for R/C transmitters.
- Scale Model Products – SMP was leading American plastic producer of promotional models, introduced the 3 in 1 kit, acquired by AMT.
- Scalextric – The longest-established manufacturer of model slot cars. Creator of the landmark 1:32 slot car line in 1957.
- Schabak Modell – Made Ford and other German model cars in the 1990s mainly in 1:43 scale, known particularly for aircraft liveries.
- Schuco Modell – Traditional German toy producer in all kinds of scales. Very good detail, especially in 1:43.
- SCX – Spanish manufacturer of 1:43 and 1:32 slot cars and 1:32 digital slot car systems. Formerly Scalextric of Spain. Sold under the brand name Scalextric in Spain and Mexico. Outside those markets, sold under the brand name SCX.
- Septoy – Earlier name for Gasquy – Septoy of Belgium in late 1940s
- Serpent – Dutch radio controlled cars.
- Sesame – French toy plastic trucks
- SG Racing Cars – Italian radio-controlled cars
- Shepherd Micro Racing – Italian 1:8 radio-controlled IC track cars
- Shinsei Mini Power (models) – Cranes and construction vehicles, also plastic toy and remote control cars.
- Siccom – Italian 1:8 radio-controlled buggies
- Signature Models – Detailed 1:18 & 1:32 scale diecast models often sold in museums and dealerships.
- Siku – German model manufacturer, mostly Matchbox-like 3 inches cars.
- Simex – Plastic cars made in Argentina first and later Colombia
- SK – Hong Kong maker of plastic toys
- Skynet – A division of Aoshima producing 1:48 scale diecast aircraft.
- Slik Toys – Aluminum toys made in Lansing, Iowa.
- Shine Dew – ODM/OEM model train factory in China, Duangdong.
- Slottech – US Manufacturer of HO (1:64) slot cars.
- Slot.it – Italian manufacturer of 1:32 slot cars and accessories.
- Small Wheels – A brand name of Western Models.
- Smer – Longtime Czech producer of mainly plastic cars and trucks about 1:43 scale. Some kits.
- SMTS – Scale Model Technical Services. Prolific white metal manufacturer, from Hastings, England, with their own range, also making brass masters for many other manufacturers, e.g. Conquest/Madison.
- Solido – French manufacturer of 1:43 and 1:18 scale models
- Soma – Tonka – like toys, mainly trucks.
- Somerville – British manufacturer of 1:43 scale white metal models, especially British cars of the 1930s and 40s and Swedish cars (Volvo and Saab) of the 1940s, 1950s and 1960s
- Spark models - French manufacturer of high quality resin models in 1:87, 1:64 1:43, 1:18, 1:12, 1:8 and 1:5 (Helmets) scales. Made in Mainland China, Macau and Madagascar. Spark focus on motorsport such as Le Mans 24h, F1 and other racing series. Their other brands such as Bizarre and Milezim.
- SpecialC.-98 –
- Speedy – Matchbox sized line of cars made by Mercury of Italy.
- Spot-on – 1:42 scale die-cast made by Triang in Belfast, Northern Ireland. Phased out when Lines Bros (Triang) took over Meccano who made the well-established Dinky toys. Some reissued by Norev.
- Stahlberg Models – Finnish plastic promos of Swedish Saabs and Volvos, mostly in 1:20 scale.
- Starter Models – 1:43 scale, mostly GP and NASCAR handbuilt resin kits. Made in Marseilles, France.
- Stelco – German brand of 1:43 scale soft plastic and 1:64 scale hard plastic toy cars.
- Stirling Scale - British Brand of high quality 1:18 diecast model cars founded by Model Universe.
- Stjerne – Danish diecast from the 1950s, most models similar to Vilmer.
- Strombecker/Bachmann – American manufacturer started in 1962. 1:32 slot cars. Formerly Strombecker was a separate company making slot cars and Bachman, electric train sets.
- Studio 27 – High end scale model and accessory manufacturer from Japan
- Sun Star – Chinese mostly 1:18 scale. Nicely done, especially limousines and pickup trucks. In 2000s moved into European racing cars of many types.
- Sunnyside – Mostly American vehicles.

== T ==
- Takara Tomy – Japanese diecast manufacturer, mostly Matchbox size. Known as Tomy in English speaking countries.
  - Tomica – Japanese diecast manufacturer, Tomy brand, mostly Matchbox size. Later models made in China and Vietnam.
  - Tomy – Japanese toy company making many different kinds of vehicles, and more. Makes Matchbox sized Tomica. Also Takara Tomy in Japan.
  - Tomytec – Subsidiary of Takara Tomy, mostly HO scale plastic cars.
- Tameo Kits – Italian 1:43 scale model manufacturer, often F1 kits.
- Tamiya – Japanese high quality die-cast manufacturer, more famous for plastic kits and radio control cars. First 1960s exports were a range of 1:24 slot car kits. Some 1:43 scale diecast as well.
- Tarmac Works Model Cars – Offices are currently located in Japan and Hong Kong.
- Team Azarashi – radio controlled cars
- Team Durango – radio controlled cars
- Tecnomodel – High quality resin models built in Italy.
- Tekno – manufacturer of 1:43 scale die-cast models originally based in Denmark; now known for truck models
- Telsalda – Hong Kong manufacturer of plastic trucks and vans.
- Tenth Technology (TTech) – 1:10 radio-controlled buggies, best known for the Predator buggy
- Testors Corporation – Known early on for model paints, later made plastic toy cars, plastic kits and metal kits, in association with Bburago and (later) Maisto. Also paired up with Italeri and Fujimi.
- Tetsuma - Known for their highly detailed polyresin-cast models in 1:64th scale
- Thunder Tiger – Remote control buggies and monster trucks.
- Tiger Wheels - American manufacturer of 1:64 scale vehicles similar to Hot Wheels and Matchbox.
- Time Model –
- Tin Wizard – High quality 1:43 scale metal models made in Germany.
- TK.company – Same as Ignition_Model & IG-Model.
- Tokyo Marui – Japanese manufacturer who briefly made plastic model car kits.
- Tomte Laerdal – Norwegian brand of 1:43 scale soft plastic toy cars using dies of old Dinkys and sometimes Tekno
- Tonka – US manufacturer of toy trucks and other vehicles. Often pressed steel, and often large scale.
- Tonkin Replicas - American manufacturer of die-cast trucks and trailer trucks.
- Tootsietoy – American manufacturer of die-cast vehicles, produced their first model car in 1911.
- Top Marques Collectibles – Models produced at Lucky Step Collectibles (LS Collectibles).
- Top Model – 1:43 diecast Ferraris, Alfas, Aston-Martins, Renault Alpines and others in the spirit of Box or Bang.
- TopSpeed Models – TopSpeed Model is a brand of TSM-Model, producing entry level 1:18 scale replicas for collectors with a strong balance between price and quality.
- Total Control Racing – A slotless HO Scale slot car system introduced in the late 1970s
- Toy State – More toy-like plastic cars and trucks, but many farm and other products are fairly realistic.
- Trax Models – Australian cars mainly in 1:43 scale – made in China. Owned by Top Gear.
- Traxxas – American manufacturer model nitro and electric car producer specialises in 1:10 scale cars.
- Tri-ang – English and Northern Irish concern – Minic line – trains, tin cars, diecast – including Spot-On.
- Trident – Austrian 1:87 scale plastic models.
- Trincorp, trading name of Team Trinity – radio-control cars
- Triple 9 Collection –
- Trofeu – Portuguese manufacturer specializing in 1:43 scale rally cars.
- True Scale Miniatures ltd. – a Hong Kong brand. Produced mostly in 1:18 and 1:43
  - Mini GT is a sub-brand mini scale version of TSM-Models. Mostly in 1:64.
  - TopSpeed models
- Trumpeter – Nicely detailed kits and models. Cars and military besides aircraft.
- Trux – Truck line of Australian Trax. Owned by Top Gear.
- Tudor Rose – British maker of plastic cars and trucks
- Tyco Toys – American manufacturer of HO Scale cars and sets. Owned Matchbox during the 1990s.

== U ==
- Ungar – Kits from the 1960s, U.S. race cars, toy slot car sets, woodburning kits; at times associated with Eldon (toy company).
- Unimax – Chinese manufacturer of military diecast (especially tanks) and 'Radline RC' remote control vehicles.
- Universal Hobbies – Eagle became this (out of Jouefevolution).
- UT Models – UT Limited (Unique Toys HK Ltd). Retired brand name of the former Gateway Global, sister company to AUTOart. Manufactured 1:18 scale model cars.Also associated to UT models. Formerly associated with Paul's Model Art & Minichamps.

== V ==
- V & V Model – From Czech Republic
- VAM – Plastic toy maker from Zaragosa, Spain
- Vanguards – Or "Days Gone Vanguards". Line of '50s and '60s mostly British cars and trucks made by Lledo.
- Vape-Bourbon – French plastic trucks
- Verem – Majorette subsidiary producing old dies of Solido.
- VF Models - by Volker Feldman of Germany, scale 43 kits and models.
- Victory Industries of Guildford – 1:20 plastic models and 1:32 slot cars.
- Victory Models – Handbuilt 1:43 resin cars (incl. related brand La Familia)
- Vilmer – Danish diecast similar to some of Tekno's earlier trucks. Mostly trucks
- Vitesse Models – 1:43 diecast metal models from Portugal. Later connected to Ixo?

== W ==
- Wave Corporation – Japanese resin model manufacturer from the 1990s, notable for F1 models, no longer produces.
- Wells-Brimtoy – Classic tinplate and plastic toys from this British company
- Welsotoys – British maker of larger plastic remote control cars and trucks
- Western Models – handbuilt 1:43 white metal cars (incl. related brand Small Wheels). Used to provide models to Danhausen.
- WELLY DIECAST - mass-produced diecast model cars and bikes in 1:18, 1:24, 1:32 and 1:43 scale
- Werk83 - German diecast model brand founded by CK Models making a variety of modern and classic road and race cars
- White Rose Collectibles – Specially detailed Matchbox toys, and particularly team sports versions.
- WhiteBox – models' boxes refer to "Model Car World", some sellers often write on their sites WhiteBox(ixo).
- Wiking – German maker of primarily 1:87 plastic models.
- Gerald Wingrove. Exquisitely detailed models made of wood, brass and other materials.
- H. Wittrock – Plastic toys, especially buses made in Copenhagen, Denmark
- WPL RC - Specialising in detailed radio control models up to 1:10 scale (mostly off-road). Based in Shantou, Guangdong, China.
- Wrenn – manufactured a 1:52 scale slot car system in the 1960s capable of running three cars independently in either slot.
- Wingrex Cars – An Indian brand creating handcrafted car sculptures from client photos, in 4-inch size, made to order and shipped worldwide as collectible art, exclusively to the registered car owners..
- Winross Models – American manufacturer of promotional diecast tractor trailer trucks.
- Winstar - Manufactures Kami Motors Die-Cast.
- Wizzard High Performance – 1:64 scale slot car manufacturer.
- Wyandotte Toys – Cast iron manufacturer from the U.S. in the 1920s and 1930s. Later tin and some plastic toys.

== X ==
- XCarToys
- Xonex - Pedal car miniatures similar to Hallmark Christmas ornaments.
- XRAY Model Racing Cars, Slovak radio controlled cars

== Y ==
- Yankee – French radio-controlled car brand of the 1980s
- Yatming – Hong Kong manufacturer of diecast models from small to large.
- YM Model –
- Yokomo – Japanese radio controlled cars
- Yonezawa Toys – Japanese toys. Tinplate in the 1950s and 1960s. Later diecast usually in 1:43 scale. See Diapet.

== Z ==
- Zaugg – White Metal handbuilts made in Switzerland.
- Zee Toys – See Zylmex.
- Ziss Modell – German 1:43 scale producer. Classic and modern cars. See R.W. Modell and Euro-Modell.
- Zylmex – Usually 1:64 scale diecast vehicles made by Zyll Enterprises. Some larger plastic vehicles.
- Zvezda (company) - Zvezda LLC is a Russian manufacturer of plastic scale models of airplanes, military vehicles, helicopters, ships and cars. The company was founded in 1990 by Konstantin Krivenko to produce accurate scale model kits with attention to detail.

== Bibliography ==
- Force, Edward. 2002. Classic Miniature Vehicles of Northern Europe. Atglen, Pennsylvania: Schiffer Publishing. ISBN 0764317881
- Brian Jewell, F (1963). Model Car Collecting. London: Temple Press Books Ltd.
- A. Stephan, Elizabeth (2000). O'Brien's Collecting Toy Cars & Trucks. Iola, Wisconsin: Krause Publications. ISBN 0-87341-580-9.
- Ralston, Andrew. 2007. Plastic Toy Cars of the 1950s & 1960s. Dorchester, England: Veloce Publishing.
- Ralston, Andrew. 2008. Tinplate Toy Cars of the 1950s & 1960s from Japan. Dorchester, England: Veloce Publishing.
- Ralston, Andrew. 2009. Diecast Toy Cars of the 1950s & 1960s. Dorchester, England: Veloce Publishing. ISBN 978-1-84584-180-5 .
