= 1:18 scale diecast =

Scale for diecast models

1:18 scale diecast replicas are 1/18th the size of the real item. Most popular in this category are 1:18 scale automobile replicas – usually made out of Zamak zinc diecasting alloy with plastic parts. "1:18 scale" is the colloquial reference to this class of toy or replica.

== Description ==
Virtually all 1:18 scale models produced in recent years have opening doors, hoods, and trunks along with functional steering wheels which turn the front wheels. Tires are often mounted on workable 'springy' suspension systems. Normally the hood / bonnet lifts to reveal a detailed and accurate engine bay (whether this is a separate cast piece or simply a portion of the cast and painted body located between the fenders).

Higher end models are equipped with genuine leather interiors, accurate engine detail, operational sunroofs, movable windshield wipers, adjustable seats, operational gear levers and other realistic accessories. Most models are approximately 11 inches (280 mm) long by 5 inches (130 mm) wide by 4 inches (100 mm) tall, depending on what vehicle is being represented. Such detail is common to 1:18 scales and larger. Typically, and according to local law, companies that produce model cars will have licensing arrangements with real car manufacturers to make replicas of their cars, both in current production or of discontinued models.

== History ==
How 1:18 scale became a standard in diecast, especially during the 1990s, is somewhat of a question, but some of the first 1:18 scale cars appeared made in tin in the United States and Japan after World War II. These, however, were not precise in detail or proportion, but became popular in the late 1950s and early 1960s. Before World War II, some vehicles appeared in this size. Also, rather by chance, other manufacturers like Marx in the 1960s and 1970s simply made 1:18 scale large plastic toys. Plastic models in the United States, though, were usually produced in 1:25 scale.

The first zinc alloy metal cars in this scale (and also 1:24 scale) from European Manufacturers appeared around 1970, made by the likes of German Schuco Modell, Polistil, and Gama Toys. Pocher, the Italian kit maker, even manufactured kits in a large 1:8 scale. A review of models by Consumer Reports in 1979 discussed American plastic and European diecast metal models in 1:25 and 1:24 scales, but did not once mention 1:18 scale, showing that it had not yet come into marketing popularity (Consumer Reports 1979). European model makers like Schuco (which was later revived), Gama and Marklin went defunct and the market for 1:18 scale grew steadily during the mid-1980s, mainly with the likes of Bburago, Polistil (both Italian companies mass-manufacturing models in Italy) and then, later, the Asian Maisto which, arguably became the principle manufacturer of this scale worldwide. Around this time, 1:18 scale cars based around a single model that was variously repurposed were famously used for the climactic Stay Puft Marshmallow Man sequence in Ghostbusters.

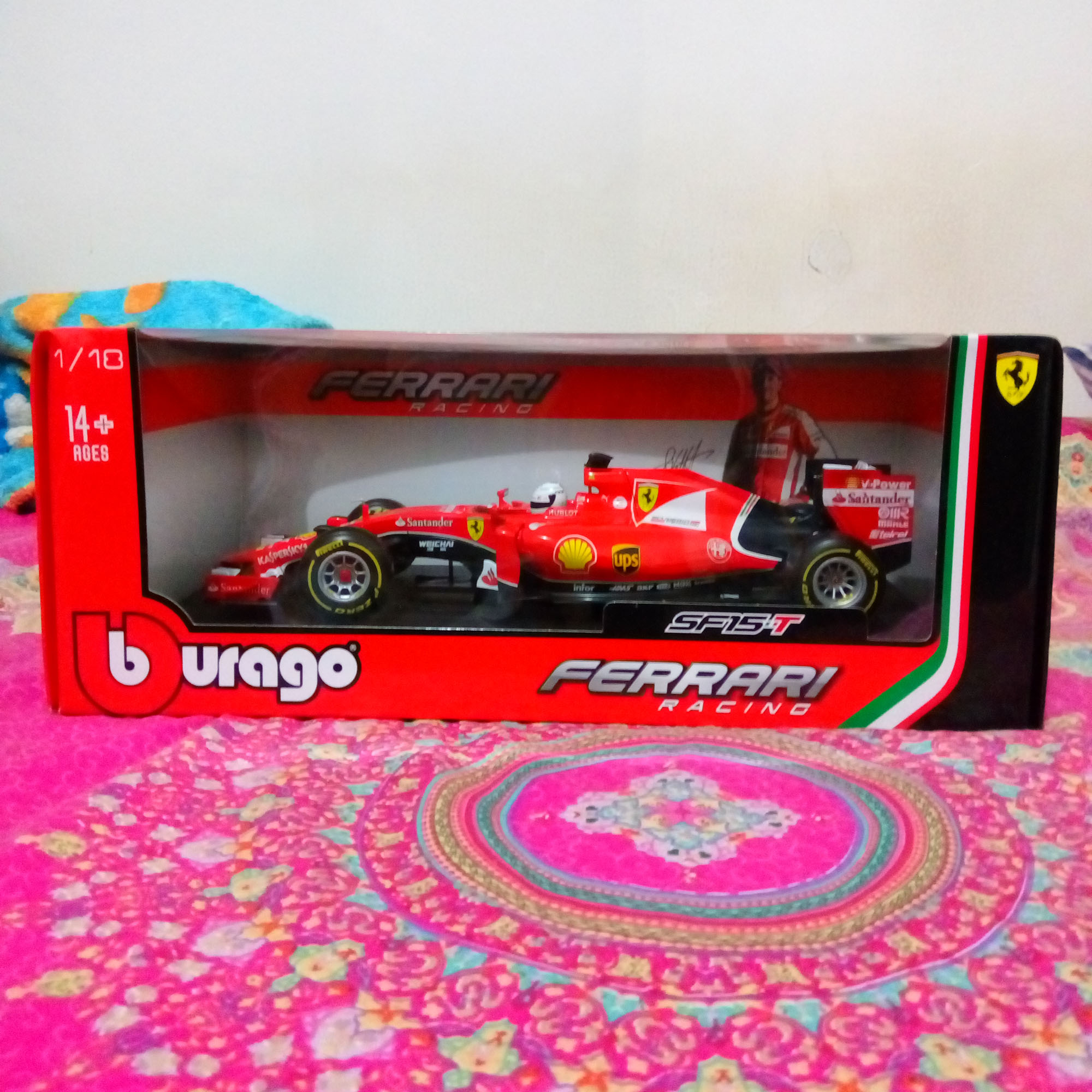
A 1:18 Ferrari SF15 F1 car. Bburago's were originally made in Italy, but now the name is owned by Maisto and they are made in China.

Throughout the 1990s, the number of different models in this scale increased exponentially as Chinese production cut manufacturing costs. Models could be sold for anywhere from $10.00 to $25.00 in the United States. By about 2000, it appeared that 1:18 scale had dominated other scales in marketing (except the diminutive and ever popular Hot Wheels) – as nearly whole rows in Toys-R-Us could be seen packed with this scale of model. At this time, many new companies flooded the 1:18 scale market. Ertl and Revell sold a limited number of diecast cars – mostly older American models (although Revell Germany made a number of diecast German and American models). Ertl's main 1:18 scale line was called "American Muscle". Other manufacturers included Anson, Yat Ming, Sun Star, MIRA, and UT Models. Often, cars featured in collectible car magazines (such as Collectible Automobile) were soon the subjects of 1:18 diecast articles.

During the early 2000s, the quality and accuracy of models improved dramatically, but price went up and they were sold in more upscale stores, dealerships, and through on-line mail order. Around 2005, "premium" manufacturers including Automodelli, Highway 61, GMP, AUTOart, and Lane Exact Detail began to offer very high-quality, highly detailed models at higher prices. Today (2017), a trickle-down effect can be seen where many features now found in mainstream, low-priced diecasts were only found before in models costing upwards of $100.00. Engine wiring and plumbing, carpeting in the interior or trunk, detailed instrument panels, seatbelts, and photo-etched details are now common even in models costing under $50.00.

Models are found from a number of retail merchants, such as Wal-Mart and KB Toys (in the United States), and a number of Antique Malls and Centers offer models ranging from $20.00. Many are available through eBay, etsy or other bidding and diecast sales websites. This size remains popular with collectors. With the popularity of eBay and other hobby Web sites, fewer models of this size seem to be found in physical stores.

== Significant Categories of Replicas ==
- Antique/Classics (pre-World War II)
- Construction vehicles
- Fifties Cars
- Formula 1 Cars
- Modern Cars (1990s and newer)
- Muscle Cars (1960s–1970s)
- Police Cars
- Sports Cars
- Touring Cars

== Manufacturers of 1:18 replica automobiles ==
- ACME Manufacturing
- Action Performance
- Anson (now discontinued)
- Auto World
- AUTOart
- Bad
- Bauer
- BBR / Top Marques
- Bburago
- Biante
- Carmania
- Carousel 1
- Classic Carlectables
- CMC
- Chrono (Classic British marques)
- Ertl
- Exoto
- Fairfield Collectibles
- Fast Women
- Gate (a division of Gateway which also owns AUTOArt)
- Giodi (now discontinued)
- GMP
- Greenlight Collectibles
- GT Spirit
- Guiloy
- Highway 61 Diecast Promotions by FF Ertl
- Hot Works
- Hot Wheels / Hot Wheels Elite / Mattel
- Ignition
- Jada
- Jadi
- Jouef Evolution (by Jouef, now discontinued,
- Kyosho
- Lane / Exact Detail
- Maisto
- Minichamps / Paul's Model Art
- Mira
- Milestone Development Group
- Mondo Motors
- Motor City Classics
- Motorhead Miniatures
- Motorart
- Motormax / RBI
- Muscle Machines
- MR Collection
- Neo (in mold-cast resin, not metal)
- NEX
- Norev
- Onyx / Quartzo
- OttOmobile (in mold-cast resin, not metal)
- Paudi Model
- Playjocs Spain
- Polistil (discontinued in 1993)
- Precision Miniatures (now discontinued)
- Racing Champions (now discontinued)
- Revell
- Ricko
- R & R
- Schuco
- Shelby Collectibles
- Signature Models
- Solido / Majorette
- Spark / Minimax
- Sun Star
- Technomodel
- Toystate
- True Scale
- Universal Hobbies / Eagle Collectibles / Jouef
- UT Models (now discontinued)
- Welly
- Winners Circle
- Yat-Ming

== See also ==
- Die-cast toy
