= Wingrove (surname) =

Wingrove is a surname. Notable people with the surname include:

- Billy Wingrove (born 1982), English freestyle footballer
- David Wingrove (born 1954), English writer
- Elsie Wingrove (1923–2016), Canadian baseball player
- Francis Wingrove (1863–1892), Australian cricketer
- Gerald Wingrove (1934–2019), English writer
- Nigel Wingrove (born 1957), English film director
- Rixon Wingrove (born 2000), Australian baseball player
