= Budgie =

Budgie may refer to:

- Budgerigar (also budgie), a small, long-tailed, seed-eating parrot

== Arts ==
- Budgie (band), a Welsh heavy metal band from Cardiff
  - Budgie (album), the debut album by the Welsh heavy metal band Budgie
- Budgie (musician) (born 1957), English drummer
- Budgie (TV series), a British television series starring popstar Adam Faith
- Budgie the Little Helicopter, a British animated television series

== Other ==
- Budgie (desktop environment), a desktop environment that currently uses GNOME technologies
- Budgie Toys, a British die-cast toy distributor turned manufacturer
