= Wingrove =

Wingrove may refer to:

== Places ==
- Wingrove, Newcastle upon Tyne
- Wingrove, West Virginia
- Wingrove, Buckinghamshire

== Other uses ==
- Wingrove (surname)
