= Billy Blastoff =

Toy line

- Billy Blastoff Space Scout
Manufacturers	Eldon, Tomy
Era	1960s-1970s
Category	Action figures

The toy line known as Billy Blastoff incorporated several versions of a four-inch-tall, plastic, child-faced adventurer produced by Eldon in the late 1960s and early 70s. The concept was licensed to Tomy (of Japan) by Eldon for distribution in Japan . Billy Blastoff was sometimes packaged as a deluxe Space Set with his friend Robbie Robot (Robbie was also featured in his own packaged set). Billy and Robbie could be purchased separately or packaged with equipment in different Action Sets. Vehicles made for the figures were powered by a gear beneath the figures' pack which also held "AA" batteries. The battery pack could also power several figure-held accessories such as a Radar Scope, Space Gun and underwater light via jack and corded plug.

The earlier versions of Billy Blastoff had twin red air tanks (resembling twin scuba tanks), featured a helmet with coordinating red trim and a space suit with a blue belt and suspenders. This early version of Billy Blastoff could power vehicles but could not walk. In 1970 Billy was remolded to better match the spacesuits of the Apollo Astronauts with an all white helmet, a more rectangular beige air supply, restyled space suit and black (as opposed to yellow) gloves. In North America this later version of Billy Blastoff was introduced with the advertising tagline "Eldon's New Billy Blastoff, Now He Walks". Like the earlier version this Billy Blastoff could also power vehicles with the gear at the bottom of the air supply / back pack.

Some carded accessory packs were marketed in Europe, and possibly Canada and the US in limited regions.

Eldon also produces some additional Billy Blastoff "spin-off" products including a bubble-blowing plastic pistol called the Billy Blastoff Bubble Popper and the Billy Blastoff board game.
