= Kaden models =

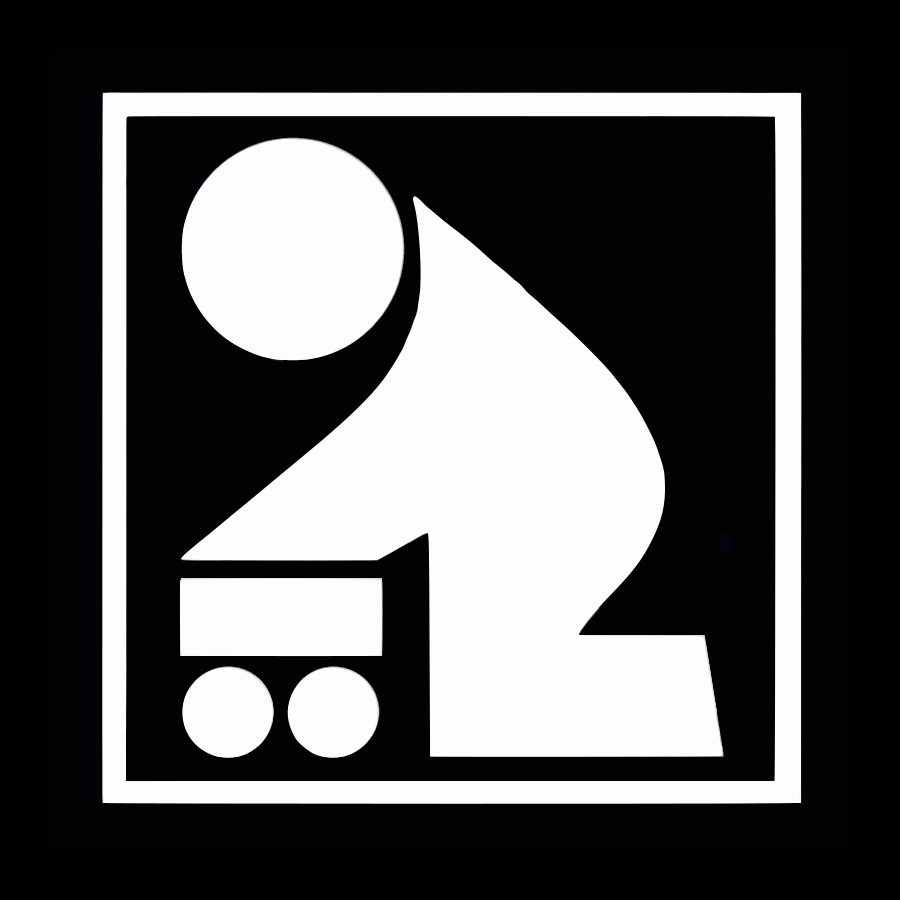
Kaden logo with generalized child and toy vehicle. The earlier factory logo was two intersecting circles (like a Venn diagram) with the letters KDN inside.

Kaden Nachod (and the later name, KOVAP Náchod) is the somewhat anglicized name for the Kovodružstvo Náchod toy factory in the town of Nový Hrádek in the Czech Republic. The factory, however, started making toys around 1950 when the country was still communist united Czechoslovakia.

== History ==
The state factory, started around 1950, was also called by the acronym KDN which led to the spelled out and somewhat more western name Kaden. The enterprise reportedly changed its name to Kovap Náchod in 1991, though the factory's products were most commonly referred to by the Kaden name during the 1970s and 1980s. Since about 2005, the company uses both names as different brands.

Approximately through the 1960s, the KDN logo included those letters inside of two overlapping circles, like a Venn diagram. Since the 1970s, the KDN factory logo has been a stylized child on his knees playing with a vehicle with the entire logo against a black background. The newer logo is similar, but with a yellow, red and blue 'Rubik's-cube'-like graphic behind the child (with the 'E' in Kaden similarly colored). By contrast, the Kovap logo appears as a stylized 'K'.

Many, but by no means all, Kovap models were apparently retooled 1960s and 1970s CKO/Georg Kellerman pressed metal toys from Nuremberg, West Germany.

== Communist toys ==
Typically, East European toys and other more sophisticated models replicated the actual vehicles chosen by these governments for the people, the workplace, or more often, the communist party elite. Real vehicles were not manufactured as a result of research development response to market demand, thus Eastern European automobiles usually lagged far behind the west. Since there was no market, what people received was what the government deemed worthy of production. In Hungary, Poland, Czechoslovakia, East Germany, therefore, and, above all, Russia, most vehicle toys replicated the real vehicles from the state factories – operated and owned by the government. The toys, then, were also made in factories owned by the state. Sometimes the toys were made in the same factories as the real vehicles.

Nevertheless, Czechoslovakia was the country behind the Iron Curtain that let engineers and designers have the most free rein in the production of vehicles. Real factories such as Škoda and Tatra developed unique designs engineering features which were lacking in communist industrial environments elsewhere. Tatra was known for aerodynamic shapes, contracting with Torino design studios in Italy. Tatra trucks are known world-wide for their endurance. Škoda was one of the few communist names to have market success in western Europe, even participating in western rallying. Not unexpectedly, Czech toys largely represented the vehicles from these state enterprises.

== Czech toys ==
=== From play to promotional ===
Kovodružstvo Náchod was established in 1950. Its vehicles ranged from tractors and military to everyday Škodas and politburo Tatras. As seen below, varieties of the famous Tatra trucks were common. Some of the first KDN toys manufactured in the late 1960s and through the 1970s were either more conservative plastic construction vehicles like a cement mixer, a dump truck, and a road roller – or brightly colored lithographed tin tractors and forklifts among others. KDN also produced other toys and models in plastic for promotional purposes including the KDN Kino 85 working film projector.

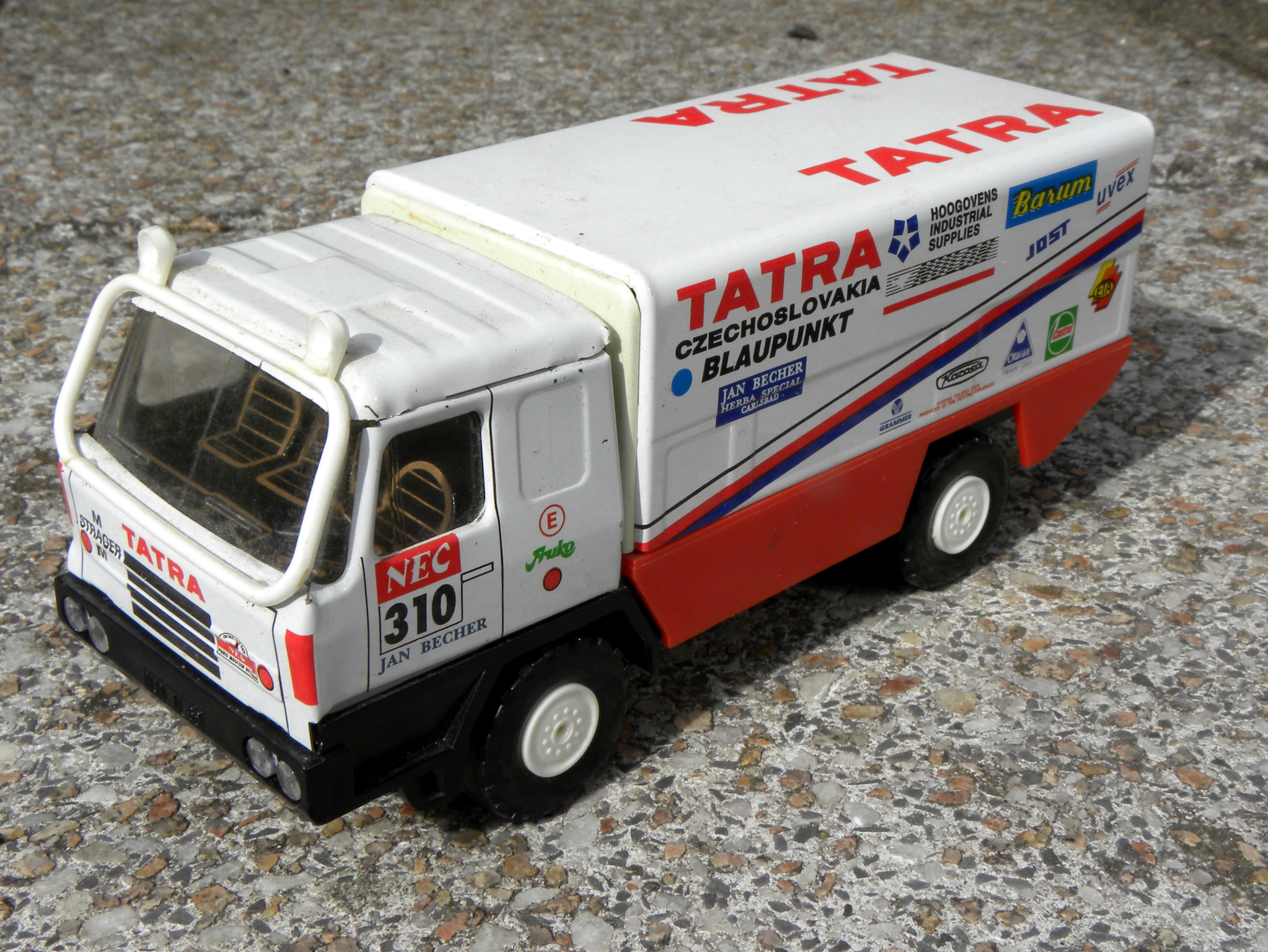
A later Kovap / KDN Tatra 815 exploration-rally truck in pressed tin.

Many vehicles, even though often done in plastic, had a refined western quality and solid feel lacking in other communist bloc toys (with the exception of many Russian models which were often much more impressive in miniature than the real cars they represented). Sizes ranged from about 1:20 or larger scale (about 6 – 7 inches long) to about 1:43 for cars, vans, tractors and also larger Tatra trucks. Some of the smaller early cars like the Innocenti Mini and Mercedes 280 sedan were a bit simpler than the later Miniauto range. Many of these were marked KDN and had the overlapping circles logo on their bases.

These often had a crisp promotional feel, and one wonders if Škoda dealerships in the west (say, Spain and Italy where Škodas were fairly popular) used the tiny cars for sales purposes. Circa 2010, Kaden has also begun to offer 1:87 scale coupes and sedans of their new VW affiliated offerings. Packaging, usually colorful for the toys, was a bit more subdued for the 1:43 scale cars, accurately illustrating the vehicles and featuring logos of the real vehicles.

=== Miniauto Range ===
The promotional style toys in 1:43 scale were called the 'Miniauto Model Range' and offered by the mid to late 1970s, alongside some of the brighter play toys. Most offerings were Škoda and Tatra cars, often used for promotional purposes – for example the Škoda 110 sport coupe. A styrene plastic was used for these models that was harder than that of American kit makers, and often with very simple interiors. Proportions of the bodies compared to the real vehicles was excellent and details were nicely rendered. Headlights and tail lights were clear lenses and looked realistic – for example on the Tatra 613 Vignale sedan, the tail lights were actually set on metal bezels – an interesting detail, even if they were not always installed perfectly straight. Tires were realistic looking hard black plastic and wheels were silver metal caps stamped with five even holes (four for the Tatras – they look like buttons). These wheels are an outstanding identifying marker for Kaden Miniauto models and for a time they even offered a five-spoke metal wheel almost identical to that of Märklin's stamped metal wheels on their short-lived 1:43 scale series.

Kaden TatraT613 sedan. Though plastic, probably the best detailed and proportioned scale model car to come out of eastern Europe.

Some of the Miniauto range were copies of Politoys M-Series cars done in plastic, similar to how MacGregor did metal copies of the M-Series in Mexico, and how others were also done in plastic in the Soviet Union like the Maserati Mistral. Some M-series cars offered in plastic by Kaden were a Jaguar XK-E, Mercedes-Benz 220 sedan, Citroen DS, FIAT 1300 and 1800 sedans, a FIAT 1100 Lusso Berlina, Alfa-Romeo 2000 Berlina, an Innocenti Austin A40, and a Ford Anglia Deluxe. These could be offered in tasteful whites, grays, and reds or odd, unrealistic, and very un-Politoys bright pinks, chartreuses, purples, and oranges.

Some of the last of the 'Miniauto' line were the pedestrian Škoda Favorites. These were also done in plastic and featured opening rear hatches, though wheels were now in plastic also. The boxes for the toys featured photos of the actual car.

Starting around 1994, Kaden started offering diecast metal more regularly. One of the first cars offered in metal was the Škoda Felicia sedan and Estate which featured opening doors. These were offered as dealer promotionals. Newer VW-influenced Octavia sedans and wagons were also model selections with specially decorated boxes for dealers. Some of these, like the Octavia were also made in an attractive Hungarian Rendǒrség (police) and also Portuguese police livery. Kaden's 1:87 scale offerings were also used for promotional purposes.

Early on, in larger 1:20 scale in plastic, Kaden offered a Stahlberg-like (but more toy-like) series of Skodas in brighter yellows, blues, and also white. Models such as the 120L sedan and the 1203 van had opening hoods and trunks or tailgates. The 1203 came in several different versions: police, ambulance, pickup with canvas top, and regular model. The 120L sedan could be found towing a small trailer or came in police livery. Most of these models were apparently offered from the 1970s through the 1990s – because the real cars saw little change over the same time period.

=== Trucks, tractors and military ===
A series of relatively newer Tatra trucks was offered in the 1980s and 1990s in plastic by Kaden, as were real Czech and Slovak production Zetor tractors which were often sold with hay trailers, with the tractor sometimes motorized with a simple remote control. Some of the trucks offered were delightful choices for miniature reproduction like the Tatra 815 in Paris-Dakar rally form or detailed diecast 815 dump truck with working suspension, tipping bed, tilting cabin, and two sets of steering wheels. Another 815 was a foam sprayer fire truck and another a "Kaden African Expedition" truck with trailer.

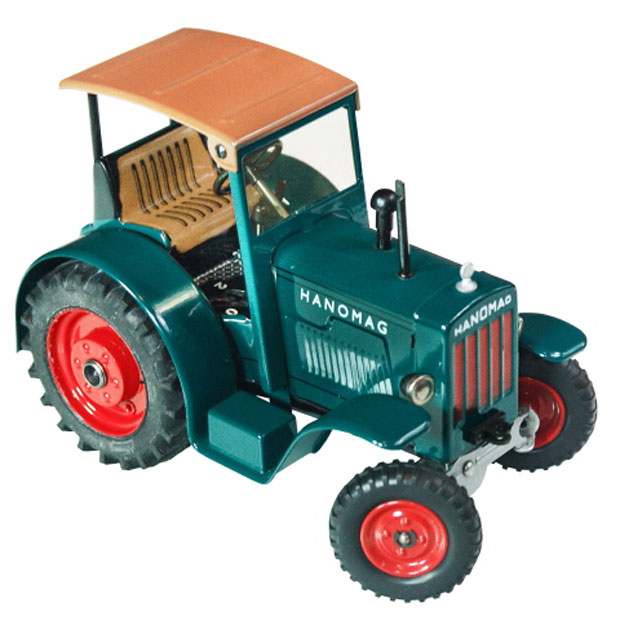
Pressed tin KOVAP Hanomag R 40 tractor.

The Kaden Tatra 815 was the GTC ("Grand Touring Caravan") which in 1987, (while Czechoslovakia was still Communist) was driven by a crew over 200,000 kilometers across six continents and through sixty-seven countries. The Tatra was decorated in "Tatra Around the World" paint and had large windows on the front and sides of the box. The pressed tin miniature replicated the real truck, with window tampos, accurate colors and sponsors on the sides of the truck. This same 'big box' Tatra was also done as a large ambulance. One Tatra website also displayed a 815 – a Tatra car carrier filled with three non-Kaden T600 1938 Tatraplans.

Most later trucks were either diecast zamac or, more commonly, pressed tin. The factory usually kept the scale to 1:43 or 1:48, so the trucks take up more space than the cars in the same scale. Some vehicles were also offered in 1:24 scale and many were made in pressed steel, including a World War II half-track, a Jeep, and a Nazi Kubelwagen. When 'pressed steel' is mentioned, it is not like rather crudely done early Tonka or Buddy L products. Kaden finely crafted metal pieces in an exacting and precise way resulting in a very professional look. Today, like with its cars, Kaden makes most of its trucks in diecast zamac. For example, its Tatra T-815 military materials carrier is finely done in diecast.

=== Continuation of Kovap and Gonio ===
In 1991, shortly after the fall of communism, but before the split between the Czech Republic and Slovakia, the company Kovodružstvo Náchod apparently changed its name to Kovap Náchod probably reflecting the new line of pressed steel cars and trucks from tooling inherited from the old German Kellerman CKO firm. From this time forward the company offered vehicles under two lines: Kaden Models for the more precision detailed diecast models of Skodas and Tatra trucks, and the Kovap name for the pressed steel vehicles.

The vehicles offered did not include all of the old Kellerman offerings. For example, the Ford Capri and some of the helicopters were not carried over. Those offered were all numbered from 400 to 600 and included a Mercedes-Benz 350SL convertible and hardtop, Volkswagen transporters (in regular van, pickup, ambulance and postal variations), a camper trailer, dump truck, ladder fire truck, a flat bed canvas truck with trailer, a forklift, a bus and variations on some older Mercedes trucks. On the back of the box shown in the picture, Tatra trucks previous made by KDN are also shown.

On the bottom of the Volkswagens, which are almost all tin, it still says "CKO" with the word "Replica" and the Kovap logo applied as a sticker. Some of the newer Kovap models even appeared superior in finish and packaging to those of the old Kellerman.

Kaden also took over the production of Gonio, another model company from the Czech Republic that had earlier produced a large range of high quality 1:24 scale military vehicles in pressed tin which Kaden developed further. Gonio had operated from Tovarni 560, 374 15 in Trhove Sviny. No new models were made, but Kaden continued many variations, including the Long Range Desert Group Jeep which was shown in the last of the Gonio price lists, but which finally arrived in the later Kaden Red box, rather than the Gonio Blue packaging. Vehicles like the Kubelwagen came out with material covered plastic roofs. Some items shown in catalogues have never seen the light of day. Apparently, however, Kaden has ceased producing the Gonio range.

== Factory directions ==
With the fall of communism, as with all the Soviet satellite countries, products were recrafted and repackaged to be sold to the western markets and toys were no exception. Reflecting the 180 degree change in economic orientation away from the Soviet Union, Kovodružstvo Náchod changed its name to Kovap Náchod in 1991. In 1993, Kaden toys became products of the Czech Republic as Slovakia made its own way in the new Europe. As of 2016, both names had parallel websites.

In the mid-1990s, Kaden models continued to be sold in the west, but now in diecast metal instead of pressed tin or plastic. Offered are modern Škodas, Jeeps, and Tatra trucks and military materials carriers. Škoda models are often sold in promotional company colored boxes of white and green, which carry company information on their end flaps. The company (which it now legitimately can be called – not being a communist party factory anymore) has also moved into the buzzing European 1:87 scale market.
