= Ninco =

Spanish toy company

Ninco is a Spanish manufacturer and brand name of 1:32 scale slot cars and track.

== History ==
The Ninco Company was established in 1993 in Spain. They create their 1/32-scale models as perfect replicas of the originals with every detail. Ninco was the first company to use the durable, lightweight ABS plastics. This company produces and manufactures F1, road and historic cars, and scaled down off-road vehicles. Each vehicle under Ninco's market can have its motor changed to alter its performance. The vehicles also have suspension to give an even more realistic appeal and environment. A typical set will include two models and controllers, a power supply, and a track with guard rails. The track has many pieces so it the user can create a variety of different track layouts. Up to eight individually controlled cars can be used at the same time with the digital slot racing system. While racing, the racer can switch lanes and also choose from seven different race models. Tires on the cars can also be changed to fit the track and environment.
