= Kurt Becker KG =

Kurt Becker KG was a German manufacturer of die-cast miniature cars. The factory was located in Berlin, Germany.

== History ==
Miniatures of the Auto Union Type A 'long-tail' racing car produced by Kurt Becker KG around 1947.

Little is known about the history of the Kurt Becker KG, other than that it was founded by the German entrepreneur Kurt Becker from Berlin, presumably shortly after World War II. As far as known Kurt Becker KG only produced one series of miniature cars around 1947.

== Racing cars ==
Around 1947 Kurt Becker KG produced a series of die-cast miniatures of the pre-war Auto Union racing car in scale 1:43. The miniature was of the first racing car of the Auto Union series, the Type A, more specifically of the very rare 'long-tail' version. This car was raced on the AVUS in Berlin in 1934 by German racing car driver August Momberger. The choice of model by Kurt Becker KG was unusual, since the Auto Union racing cars had their heyday in the 1930s as the flagships of Nazi-Germany, and never returned to the race tracks after the war.

This series of Auto Union racing cars by Kurt Becker KG was known as the B1300 series. The racing cars were available in six different color combinations:

- Off-white/kaki color with red seat (matte paint)
- Green with red seat (matte paint)
- Dark red with off-white/kaki seat
- Light red with blue seat
- Dark blue with red seat (matte paint)
- Light blue with red seat (matte paint)

Miniature of the Auto Union Type A 'long-tail' racing car in red color produced by Kurt Becker KG around 1947.

Very rare and unique for miniature cars is that four of the color variations were finished in matte paint. The reason for this is believed to be that the miniatures were painted with left-overs of German military paint, which was practically the only paint available in early post-war Germany.
