= Francis Wingrove =

Australian cricketer

Personal information
- Born: 20 April 1863; Eltham, Victoria, Australia
- Died: 27 May 1892 (aged 29); Rupanyup, Australia

Domestic team information
- Years: Team
- 1886: Victoria
- Source: Cricinfo, 24 July 2015

Francis Wingrove (20 April 1863 – 27 May 1892) was an Australian cricketer. He played one first-class cricket match for Victoria in 1886.

== See also ==
- List of Victoria first-class cricketers
