= Funmate =

Funmate (also called Funmate International) was a toy distributor based in Vancouver, BC. It was probably best known for its plastic promotional model cars made in the 1970s and 1980s. Sizes varied, but they were about 1:40 scale (four to five inches in length). The company also made a variety of other plastic toys made in Japan, including remote control cars. Later toys were made in Hong Kong.

== Promotional offerings ==
Probably Funmate's most well-known offering was a series of Ford vehicles sealed in plastic to the sides of Procter & Gamble detergent packages for 1971 and 1972. They were marketed as "Go Cars" and had a spring-loaded handle with a three-inch-long narrow metal rod that slipped into a hole in the back of the car. When not in use, the handle could be placed in another hole to the back right of the bumper. The handle was usually molded in the same color as the car. The car shot across the floor when a small black lever was depressed. Some of the later cars were made with a launching "pad" mechanism that the car rested on top of, probably because kids could get jabbed in the eye if the original rod wasn't held firmly. It could spring backwards as the original label on the bottom of the car warned.

These cars were produced in about 1:40 scale (5 inches long) and included Ford Torinos (in 1971 and 1972 body styles), a Ford Mustang Mach 1, a Maverick, a Thunderbird, a Mercury Cougar, and a Mercury Montego. They were molded in polystyrene plastic and came in light lime green, orange, yellow, beige, white and a dark maroon red. They appeared almost to be smaller versions of American promotional models, though the orange and maroon colors of plastic were not so opaque in appearance like in traditional 1:25 scale promotional models. Curiously, no dark greens or blues were offered. The cars had very accurate proportions and fair detail. Chassis were molded in a silver gray as were wheels. Tires were a hard black plastic. Because of the launching mechanism there were no interiors.

In Japan, these were sometimes packaged in non-promotional form as "OK Star" in a two tier carton that portrayed a driver with racing helmet on. These opened for display with Japanese script printed on the box. The packaging also had illustrations displaying how to use the launchers (71-73 Mustang).

A few General Motors cars in this same style were also offered. One was a 1973 Oldsmobile Omega two-door (the same general style as the Chevrolet Nova). The car came in red molded plastic with the typical Funmate gray base.

== Other toys ==
Funmate also offered other sizes of cars and other vehicles, almost always in plastic. Some were more sporty or collectible while others were commercial trucks and other vehicles. One example was a replica of a 1972 Lotus Formula One car. This car was also very similar to one made by a company named Jimson Toys. Many, but not all, of these cars had some kind of spring launch platform or "key" handle. A similar model looked a bit more like an Indy car, and also a series of closed vehicles that were called "Grand Prix Racers" were made and advertised as good for "140 mph scale speed".

Friction Volkswagen Beetles and Porsches and different kinds of trucks also appeared in about the same sizes. Some of the truck offerings, among them a cement mixer, a tow truck, a log hauling truck, a forklift and a dump truck. These were about the same length as the cars discussed above.

In the early 1980s, the company made a series of "puffy stickers" of NHL players, such as Wayne Gretzky, which could be peeled from a backing and stuck on other surfaces. Also an Apollo space command set of the moon voyage ships was offered. Toy pistols and rifles (some with scopes) were also produced. More recently, Funmate has focused on toys for young children and infants such as rattles, mobiles, fake cabbage patch kids dolls, and musical toys.
