= Automodello =

American model vehicle manufacturer

- Founded: 2010; 16 years ago
- Founder: James Cowen
- Headquarters: Buffalo Grove, Illinois, United States
- Website: automodello.com

Automodello is a manufacturer of resin-cast hand-built models in a variety of scales, founded in 2010. The company is headquartered in Buffalo Grove, Illinois.

== Inaugural introduction ==
Automodello was started by James Cowen and Raffi Minasian, released the inaugural model, a 1964 Griffith Series 200, in 2010 at the prestigious Amelia Island Concours d'Elegance where it was designated the Official Model for the event. Models were signed by Andrew "Jack" Griffith, founder of Griffith sports car that later became the TVR.

== Marques offered ==
Automodello tends to focus on British and American vehicles that have been overlooked by the modeling community. Through 2014, Automodello has released or will release thirty-six separate models. Though the company started out with 1:43 scale reproductions to exacting standards, larger scales have increasingly been offered, including a very large 1:8 (a traditionally popular scale for clay models made by designers in the large auto companies). The following are the models currently offered or planned:

1:43 scale:

- 1934 Duesenberg J Graber
- 1937 Delahaye 135MS Figoni & Falaschi Coupe
- 1938 Lincoln K V12 Judkins Coupe
- 1938 Packard Twelve Convertible Victoria was the first 1/43rd model awarded Model of the Year in the 20-year history of the Diecast Zone.
- 1939-1940 Checker Model A Taxi in both New York City and Chicago livery
- 1948 Timbs Streamliner
- 1952-1954 Cunningham C-3 Cabriolet
- 1956-1958 Dual Ghia
- 1962 Ford Mustang I Concept
- 1963 Studebaker Avanti R2 supercharged
- 1964 Marcos 1800
- 1964 Griffith Series 200
- 1964 Sunbeam Tiger Mark I
- 1964-1968 DeTomaso Vallelunga
- 1965 Ford GT40 Roadster Prototype Pricing
- 1966 Griffith Series 600
- 1966 Fitch (Corvair) Sprint
- 1966 Fitch Phoenix
- 1967 to 1972 Intermeccanica Italia
- 1969-1973 Gilbern Genie Invader
- 1972-1979 TVR M series
- 1974 to 1976 Bricklin SV1
- 2011-2014 Noble M600

1:24 scale:

- 1930 Cord L-29 Brooks Stevens Speedster
- 1934 Duesenburg J Graber
- 1935 Duesenberg SJ Speedster Mormon Meteor
- 1937 Delage D8-120 S Pourtout Aero Coupe
- 1937 Delahaye 135MS Figoni & Falaschi Coupe
- 1938 Phantom Corsair
- 1962 Ford Mustang I Concept
- 1965 Ford GT40 Roadster Prototype Pricing
- 1966 Ford Galaxie 7 litre hardtop
- 1971 Lincoln Continental Mark III

1:12 scale:

- 1967 Lotus 49 Jim Clark

1:8 scale:

- 1937 Delage D8-120 S Pourtout Aero Coupe
- 1965 Ford GT40 Roadster Prototype Pricing
- 2011-2014 Noble M600

== Model details ==
Automodello vehicles are finely detailed, especially their 1:8 scale reproductions which can cost thousands of dollars. Still, even their smaller offerings are intricate. The Cunningham C-3, for example, can be displayed with soft top or top boot. Its carpet is flocked and wire wheels have deeply laser cut spokes. Only 154 of the Cunninghams were made by Automodello. The Avanti R2 offered in 1:43 scale was likewise detailed with accurate windshield wipers, instrument panel and rubber bumper tips.

== Distribution ==
Automodello models are sold through Diecasm and Automodello Full Service Dealers around the world. Typical production is between 100 and 600 pieces per issue, though tooling may be extended to varied models and liveries. For example, the Griffith and TVR have the same basic body, which means the tooling, with minor variations, is made to last as long as possible.

Models may include signed editions by persons such as Jack Griffith (father of the Griffith and TVR), Herb Grasse (designer of the Bricklin SV-1), and John Fitch (Mercedes-Benz and Chevrolet Corvette racer, and road-safety inventor).
