= Greenlight Collectibles =

American model car manufacturer

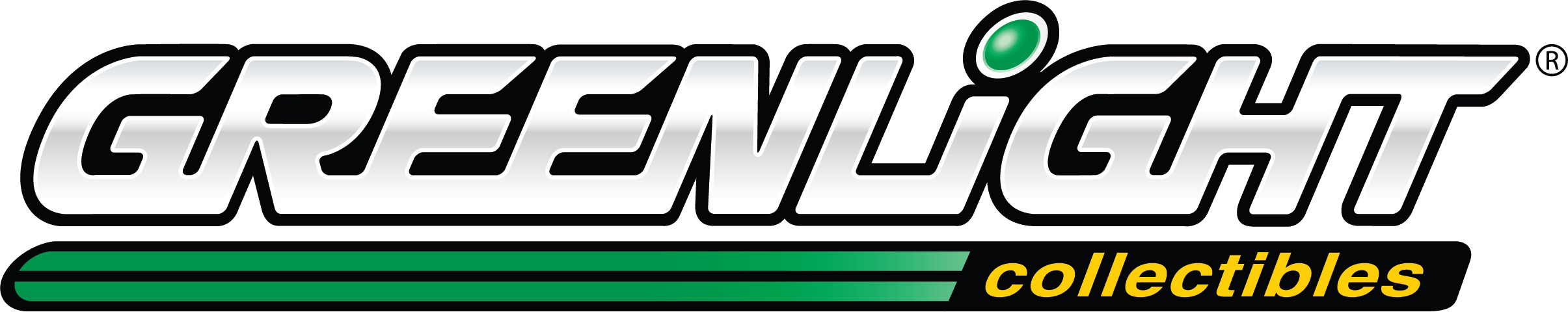
- Predecessor: Davey Sports Management Inc. Radius Group Inc.
- Founded: 2002; 23 years ago
- Founder: Kevin Davey
- Headquarters: Indianapolis, U.S.
- Key people: Vincent Tang, Walter Tang, Katie Roland
- Products: Scale model cars, trucks, military vehicles
- Number of employees: 20 (2016)
- Website: greenlighttoys.com

Greenlight Collectibles or simply Greenlight is an American manufacturing company based in Indianapolis, which produces die-cast scale model vehicles. The company was founded in 2002, and mainly produces diecast models of cars, trucks, and other vehicles.

== History ==
Greenlight was founded in 2002 by Kevin Davey, originating from sporting-goods companies Davey Sports Management Inc. and Radius Group Inc. The company initially sold sports-oriented goods and IndyCar replicas. Later it took a turn to producing diecast toy cars and replicas. It was acquired by Russell Hughes, Tom van der Scheun and Fred Lo in 2013. Hughes focused on obtaining a license from movies and TV-shows to produce vehicles associated with them. The brand already had a successful experience in 2010 of selling replicas of Ford Mustang featured in the film Bullitt. The company saw substantial revenue growth since then, reaching $12.5 million in 2015 and tripling the revenue of 2013.

== Characteristics ==
Greenlight products focus on providing details and aim to produce diecast models which are meant for collecting. Among the top-selling products are replicas of vehicles featured in movies and TV shows, including the Fast and Furious series, Gone in 60 Seconds and Supernatural. Greenlight offers some products a limited line known as Green Machine which only counts for 3 percent of a total production run. Demographically, more than 80 percent of buyers of Greenlight products are older than 18 years old and 88 percent are male. While 70 percent of the products are sold domestically, they are also sold internationally in more than 40 countries through local retailers. Their diecast models are produced in 1:18, 1:24, 1:43 and 1:64 scales, with the 1:64 size being sold the most. A new line of 1:12 scale products was launched during 2020.

Among the brand's 2022 offerings were a 1966 Ford Thunderbird convertible featured in the 1991 Hollywood classic Thelma & Louise, as well as cars featured in Riptide, MacGyver and others, as part of Greenlight's Hollywood car models series.
