= Modarri =

Toy car

Modarri is the brand name of a modular toy car line designed by David Silverglate and produced by ThoughtFull Toys of Santa Cruz, California. The 1:32 scale toy cars consist of interchangeable parts such as treaded tires, front and rear suspensions, chassis, and seats. Each car can be broken down with a hex tool and re-assembled five ways, plus parts from different Modarri cars can be combined to create hybrids.

Three main car models are in the Modarrii lineup: The S1 Street Car, X1 Dirt Car and T1 Track Car. An additional car, the Modarri DIY Car, is a paint-it-yourself version of the S1 Street Car.

Modarri cars were launched with Kickstarter assistance in 2013. In 2014 the cars received the Popular Science award "Best Toy in Show" at the North American International Toy Fair and "Toy of the Year" from Creative Child magazine.
