= 1:18 scale =

Traditional scale for models and miniatures

1:18 scale is a traditional scale (ratio) for models and miniatures, in which 18 units (such as inches or centimeters) on the original is represented by one unit on the model. Depending on application, the scale is also called two third inch scale since 1 foot is represented by 2/3 of an inch.

The scale is used for 1:18 scale diecast automobile models, military vehicles, armor, and aircraft. 1:18 scale is also commonly used for dollhouses intended for children to play with. The G.I. Joe: A Real American Hero line of figures are in 1:18 scale, although the figures are often more compatible with 1:16 & 1:18 military vehicles rather than 1:18 cars.

Attractions of the 1:18 scale include its size and its corresponding level of detail. Many 1:18 scale automobiles are over 11 inches long, while 1:18 aircraft may reach over 3 feet in length. 1:18 models often include many intricate details and moving parts not commonly found on models in smaller scales. 1:18 model cars are available as kits, where the enthusiast builds the model from start to finish. Other 1:18 subjects are sold in completed or near-completed state, requiring only minor assembly.

== See also ==
- List of scale model sizes
