= Eldon (toy company) =

American toy and office supplies company

Coordinates: 33.9179°N 118.3220°W

Eldon Industries, Inc.
- Type: Subsidiary (1991–2002); Private company (before 1991)
- Industry: Toys, office supplies
- Founded: 1946; 80 years ago
- Defunct: 2002
- Fate: Acquired by Rubbermaid in 1991; merged into Newell Rubbermaid in 2002
- Headquarters: Hawthorne, California, United States
- Key people: Robert Silverstein (president, CEO, chairman)
- Products: Slot cars, toy vehicles, playsets, office supplies
- Parent: Rubbermaid (1991–1997); Newell Rubbermaid (1997–2002)

Eldon Industries, Inc. was a toy and office supplies company located in Hawthorne, California.

== History ==
Robert Silverstein, then working in the sales and marketing department of Eldon, became the company's president by 1949. Beginning in 1957, Eldon expanded into polyethylene-based toys Billy Blastoff and Big Poly. Silverstein would become the company's CEO and chairman on May 1987.

On August 6, 1990, Rubbermaid announced their intentions to acquire Eldon for $235 million via a stock swap. The acquisition was finalized in 1991. Silverstein left the company the same year. In May 1997, Rubbermaid sold Eldon and several other businesses to Newell. Eldon remained a subsidiary until late 2002, when Newell folded it into the company.
