= Great American Dream Machines =

Great American Dream Machines is a series of model cars. The series consists of 1:43 white-metal models of mid-20th century Detroit showcars, handbuilt in the U.K. by SMTS.

== Models ==
The range was introduced in the late 1980s and includes the following models, some of which are out of production:

- GADM #1 — 1951 Buick (GM) Le Sabre — silver-blue metallic
- GADM #2 — 1954 Chevrolet Corvette Nomad — blue metallic/white roof
- GADM #3 — 1938 Buick Y-Job — black
- GADM #3 — 1938 Buick Y-Job — charcoal metallic (limited edition 100 pieces)
- GADM #4 — 1955 Lincoln Futura — pearlescent pale green
- GADM #4 — 1955 Lincoln Futura — red (1959 It Started with a Kiss movie version, limited edition 200 pieces)
- GADM #5 — 1954 Cadillac La Espada — light yellow (same as GADM #8?)
- GADM #6 — 1965 Chevrolet Corvette Mako Shark II — dark blue over light gray (running prototype version without sidepipes)
- GADM #6 — 1965 Chevrolet Corvette Mako Shark II — dark blue over light gray (non-running prototype version with matt black sidepipes, limited edition 75 pieces for PTH Past-Time Hobbies, Brookfield, IL)
- GADM #6 — 1965 Chevrolet Corvette Mako Shark II — dark blue over light gray (non-running prototype version with chrome sidepipes, limited edition 75 pieces for PTH)
- GADM #7 — 1954 Cadillac El Camino — charcoal metallic/silver roof
- GADM #8 — 1954 Cadillac La Espada — yellow
- GADM #9 — 1956 Packard Predictor — pearlescent white
- GADM #10 — 1951 Chrysler K-310 — turquoise metallic/dark blue roof
- GADM #11 — 1956 Chrysler Norseman — green metallic/light green roof
- GADM #12 — 1956 Buick Centurion — red/ivory
- GADM #13 — unknown
- GADM #14 — 1952 Chrysler C-200 — pale green/black
- GADM #15 — 1958 GM Firebird III — gold (Motorama version)
- GADM #15 — 1958 GM Firebird III — silver (Henry Ford Museum version)
- GADM #16 — 1954 GM XP-21 Firebird I — pearlescent white
- GADM #17 — 1966 Batmobile — black/red
- GADM #18 — 1954 Dodge Firearrow IV — red
- GADM #19 — 1958 Oldsmobile F-88 Mk. III — dark red metallic
- GADM #20 — 1954 Buick Wildcat II — blue metallic (Motorama version)
- GADM #20 — 1954 Buick Wildcat II — rosé metallic (Alfred P. Sloan Museum version)
- GADM #?? — 1955 Chrysler Falcon — black (#13? Minimarque?)
- GADM #1051 — 1956 Oldsmobile Golden Rocket — met. blue; met. gold
