= Gerald Wingrove =

British maker of model cars

Gerald A. Wingrove MBE
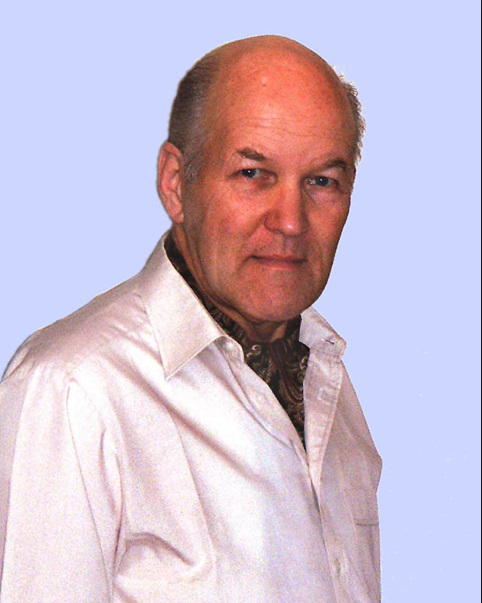
- Gerald Wingrove
- Occupation: Model engineer
- Website: geraldwingrove.com

Gerald Amery Wingrove MBE (1934 - 2019) was a model engineer and author from the United Kingdom. He is best known as a modeller of cars.

== Career ==
Wingrove left his job as a lathe operator to create models full-time in November 1967, and launched himself as a freelance model engineer, since which time he has hand crafted in metal almost 280 automobile miniatures in the scales of 1/20 & 1/15th, primarily in 1/15th scale. Most of these were commissioned by the vehicles' owners.

The first sale of his work by a major London Auction House was by Christie's on 2 August 1967 with the sale of 2 models of sailing ships in 96th scale and a SE5A aircraft model (1/20th scale) in brass and silk.

Further sales of his work were with Brooks (later amalgamated with Bonhams) of London, 21 Lots, in (Sale 112) on 4 December 1999 – and Bonhams (Sale 1793) with 74 Lots on 1 December 2003, in London.

In July 2000, Wingrove was made a Member of the Order of the British Empire for craftsmanship, and "services to Model Engineering"

In March 2005 Wingrove was awarded ‘Metalworking Craftsman of the Year’, by The Joe Martin Foundation for Exceptional Craftsmanship in the USA.

As well as cars, Wingrove has also created ship models and dioramas, the largest being the 25 square feet model of the village and ship yard of Bucklers Hard, commissioned for the Bucklers Hard Maritime Museum.

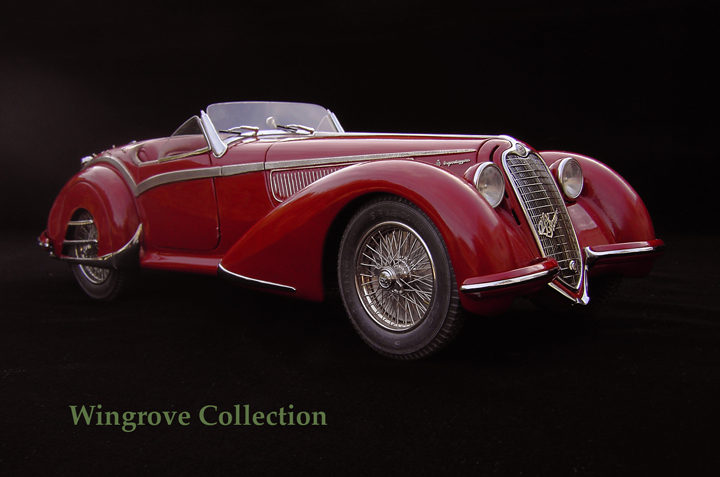
2.9 8C Alfa Romeo Spider in 1/15th scale

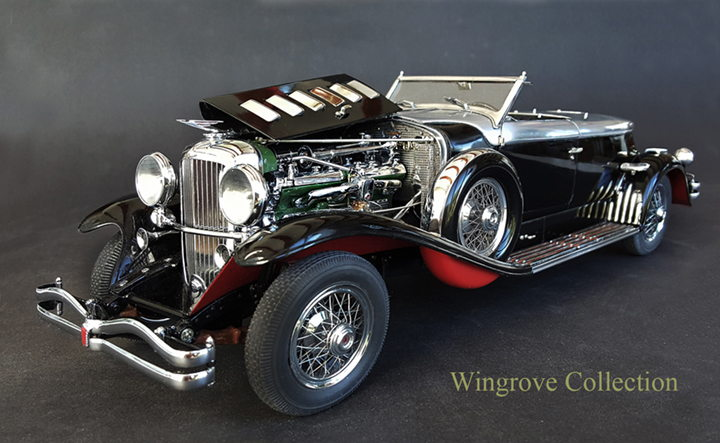
Murphy Boat Tailed Speedster Duesenberg in 1/15th scale

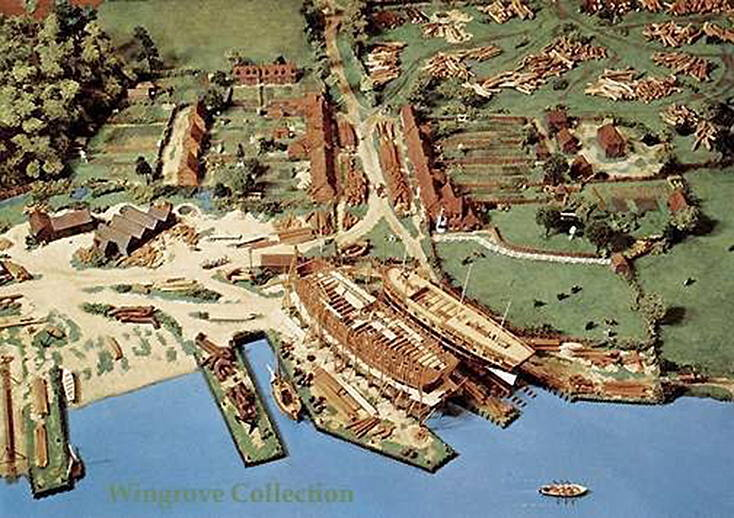
25 square foot model of the village and ship yard of Bucklers Hard

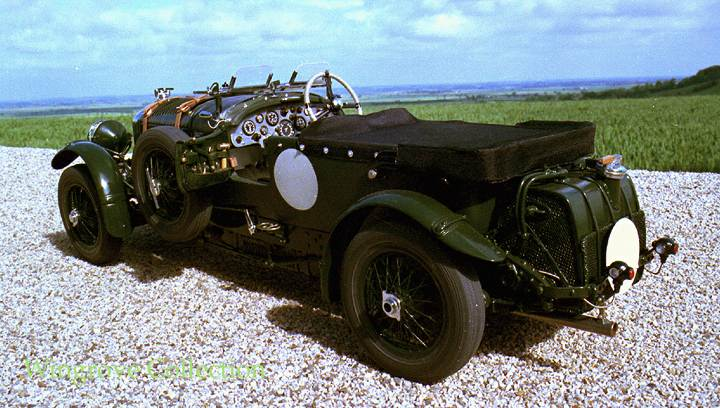
4.5-litre Supercharged Bentley with full engine and chassis detail in 1/15th scale

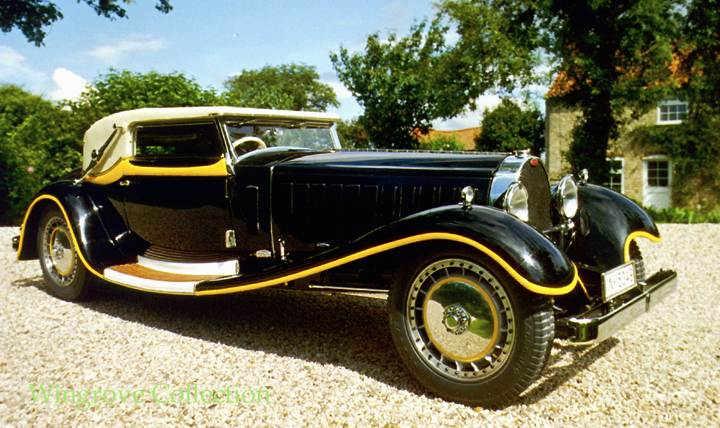
Weinberger Bugatti Royale with full engine and chassis detail in 1/15th scale

== Publications ==
- The Techniques of Ship Modeling (1974) ISBN 0-85242-366-7
- The Complete Car Modeller (1978) ISBN 0-90456-813-X
- The Model Cars of Gerald Wingrove (1979) ISBN 0-90456-812-1
- Unimat Lathe Projects: A Beginners Guide to the Lathe and How to Make Ten Useful Tools (1979) ISBN 0-90456-820-2
- The Complete Car Modeller 1 (1993) ISBN 1-86126-644-8
- Anatomy of a Bugatti Royale (1993) ISBN 0-85429-856-8 Planned, but never published
- Art of the Automobile in Miniature(2004) ISBN 1-86126-632-4
- The Complete Car Modeller 2 (2005) ISBN 1-86126-750-9
