= AUTOart =

Model car manufacturer

- Product type: Scale model cars
- Current owner: Gateway Autoart Limited (1998–present)
- Country: China
- Introduced: 1998; 28 years ago
- Markets: Worldwide

AUTOart is a Hong Kong–based scale model car line manufactured by Gateway Autoart Ltd. and sold by AA Collection Ltd.

== History ==
AUTOart was established in 1998. Other lines of diecast vehicles formerly associated with AUTOart were Gateway, Gate and UT Models. The latter was originally a German company with diecast cars made in China and associated with Paul's Model Art which produces scale models under the Minichamps brand. AUTOart currently makes composite (ABS + diecast) model cars, switching to the material after formerly producing diecast models. The car models have been divided over time into various series, including the Millennium series, Performance series and Signature series. In addition to scale models, the brand also produces automobilia like 'shock absorber' pens, carbon fiber tissue boxes, household items, and clocks in the form of a disc brake rotor with caliper.

== Models ==
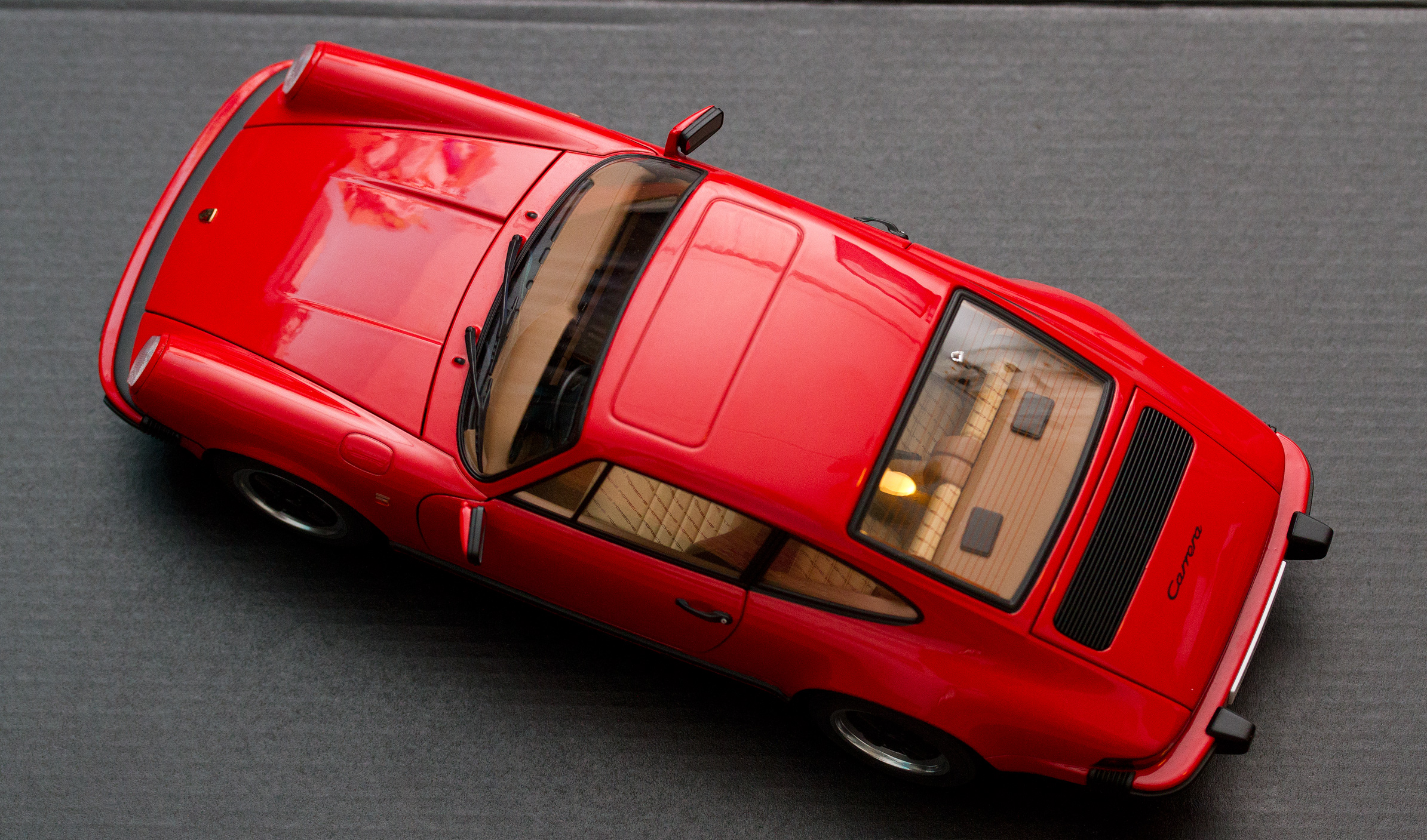
AUTOart late 1970s Porsche 911 Carrera. Note precise detail in seat cloth design, rear view mirrors, windshield wipers and logos.

AUTOart has produced more than 45 different car marques in nine different scales. Sizes generally range from 1:64 scale (2 to 3 inches long) to 1:12 scale (about 12 to 14 inches). Fine details such as carpeting, seat belts, door handles, engines, suspension, sun visors and door/hood/trunk lid dampers are reproduced. As an example, the company's 1:18 scale 1971 Mustang featured accurate details down to engine wiring, underside hood insulation, wood grain inserts in the doors, and authentically detailed brake and accelerator pedals. The 1:18 scale 1941 Willys military Jeep features accurate weld rivets, shaped reflectors, wood shovel and axe, tied whip antenna, and accurate period dashboard labels. Many AUTOart models are of exotic racing, sports, or performance vehicles, but more mundane vehicles like the New Beetle or the Chrysler PT Cruiser are also produced.

The AUTOart line consists of, but is not limited to, European vehicles. One example reviewed in Hemmings Sports & Exotic Car was the company's 1970 Lamborghini Espada 2+2 coupe which the magazine saw as a good model choice – distinct from the plethora of scale replicas made of the Lamborghini Countach or Diablo. AUTOart features both new vehicles, like the Chevrolet Corvette C7 or Lamborghini Veneno, as well as vintage racing cars like the 1965 Formula 1 Honda raced at Monaco. Historic racing cars have also included a number of other Can Am and Grand Prix cars from the 1960s and 1970s. The earliest years of actual vehicles represented in the line-up are from about 1938, with the BMW 328 Mille Miglia. American Ford Crown Victoria Police Interceptors and British "Humberside Police" Subaru Impreza along with a Mercedes-Benz E220 Berlin taxi are examples that show the company includes vehicles in professional service in its lineup alongside stock and race cars. Additionally, several Italian Vespa scooters have also been offered.

AUTOart's products are distributed in Australia and New Zealand by Biante Model Cars, for whom AUTOart have also supplied exclusive models based upon Australian cars, such as those of GM-Holden, Ford, and Chrysler. Biante Pty Ltd was originally created in 1992 by Trevor Young and his wife Bev Young; after Trevor's death in January 2006, the company has undergone two changes of ownership but has continued its association with AUTOart.

AUTOart has also produced TV and film tie-in vehicles, like the Mad Max Road Warrior 1973 Australian Ford Falcon Interceptor driven by Mel Gibson, the Gulf Porsche 917 driven by Steve McQueen in the movie LeMans, or the Toyota Trueno from the anime show Initial D. All of these were offered in 1:18 scale. The Mad Max car was also offered in 1:43.

AUTOart moved towards making model cars in composite plastic and with diecast parts instead of a traditional diecast body and plastic chassis. The company claims that the move towards plastic should result in more accurate details, such as panel lines, as well as the models costing less than their diecast counterparts.

== Promotionals ==
AUTOart models marketed under the Gateway/Gate label are often of more common brands and more likely to be found in retail stores or as dealer promotionals. As an example, when the Saturn VUE SUV was introduced mid-2002, AUTOart was selected by General Motors to provide a detailed 1:18 scale dealership promotional model. It was packaged in Saturn logo boxes, usually painted metallic burnt orange – the same paint used on the actual car. Hood, tailgate, and front doors all opened. This practice of providing a larger metal model with opening parts was significantly different than the previous use of Detroit area plastic companies used for promotional models and products.

Despite promotionals with many opening parts, one AUTOart line, their 1:18 "Motorsports" series has been criticized for having no opening parts, yet with no break in price. The company has defended their product by saying that Motorsports teams are ever more sensitive about releasing photos that might give away interior, suspension and engine bay details to their racing competitors, yet they must develop and produce marketing models for motorsports teams within short time frames. Thus, these models have sealed bodies with few or no opening parts.

== Legal issues ==
In February 2000, a lawsuit in Hong Kong courts was initiated against UT Models and Gateway Global and Gateway Hong Kong by the plaintiff, Paul's Model Art of Germany (known mostly for marketing Minichamps). Paul's Model Art claimed that it had rights to the sole distribution of certain models in Germany and that UT Models had used Gateway for new offerings to circumvent this deal. As of August 2013 the lawsuit between AUTOArt's parent company, Gateway Global, and Paul's Model Art is still ongoing.
