= Yat Ming =

Die-cast car scale model maker

Yat Ming (formerly called Yatming) was a die-cast car scale model maker, based in Hong Kong. Yat Ming Industrial Factory Ltd was founded in 1970 by Mr. Wai Ming Lam. Yat in Chinese means "best or number one". The Ming portion came from the founder's "middle name". They continued producing diecast models until 2013. In 2015, their diecast line and tooling was purchased by Lucky Industrial Group Limited, which is now producing these models under their Lucky Die Cast brand.

The company started out making muscle cars, European sedans, and transport trucks from the USA in the early 1970s. In the mid 1970s, JRI. Inc. (Road Champs) purchased the tractor trailer designs from Yatming and began marketing them under the Road Champs name in the 1980s. In the late 1990s, the company moved towards making more realistic models, and moved away from its toy-maker roots.

Yat Ming was perhaps most famous for its 1:18, 1:24, and 1:43 scale "Road Signature" series. This series continues under Lucky Diecast.
