= Budgie Toys =

English toy manufacturer

Morris & Stone Ltd.
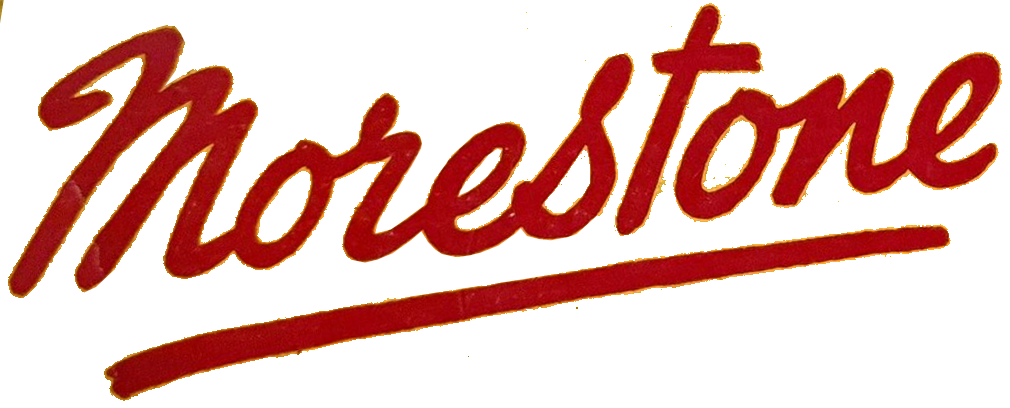
- Company type: Private (1946–61); Subsidiary (1961–66)
- Industry: Toys
- Founded: 1946
- Founder: Sam Morris
- Defunct: 1966; 60 years ago
- Fate: Acquired by S. Guiterman in 1961
- Headquarters: London, U.K.
- Products: Scale model horse-drawn vehicles diecast cars, trucks, buses, motorcycles
- Brands: Morestone (1948–59); Budgie Toys (1959–66)

Morris & Stone, Ltd., which later changed its name to the more well-known Budgie Toys, was a British die-cast toy distributor turned manufacturer, based in London. The company first specialised in horse-drawn carriages and coaches. It later made a wide variety of miniature cars and trucks.

The company marketed its products under the brand name Morestone. Some models were manufactured by a separate company called "Modern Products". Vehicles were about Matchbox car size, though still slightly smaller and simpler.

== History ==
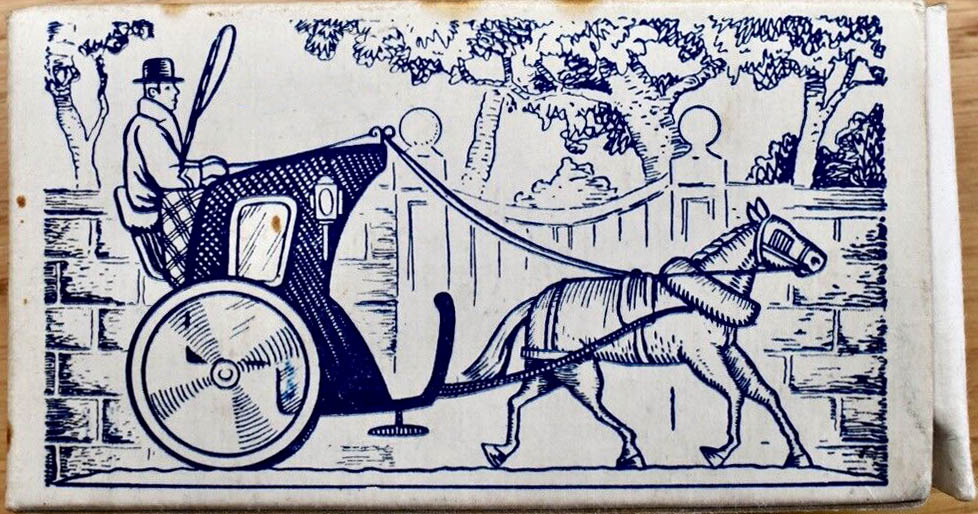
Hansom Cab box. It was the second model released under the Morestone brand, becoming an immediate success

Sam Morris began selling toys in 1946, basing his enterprise in London, becoming "Morris & Stone (London) Ltd." two years later. That same year Morris decided to launch a line of exclusive toys, named Morestone Series ("Morestone" got its name as a contraction of "Morris" and "Stone"). The first model, the Clockwork Fire Engine made by Agasee was not a great success, nevertheless the next release, a Hansom Cab (made by Modern Products Ltd.) was an immediate success, staying in production for ten years.

Vehicles were somewhat similar to Dinky Toys in concept, but other toys were also marketed, like a "dulcimer" xylophone and a toy drum. Some vehicles, like the mechanical road sweeper were equipped with clockwork motor. Often, Morestone vehicles were made by the company Modern Products, thus "A Modern Product" or simply "Modern" would be stated on the boxes, and some models were marketed as 'A Modern Product' without any reference to Morestone. Some boxes say, "Modern" within a diamond-shaped logo. Models made later (in the 1950s) were apparently made by Morestone as the Modern Product label was dropped, usually replaced by "Morestone Series". Morestone Series vehicles were varied, but commonly featured AA and RAC Land Rovers and motorcycles with sidecars. Later, reissues of Morestone Series vehicles were made in white metal by 'Zebra Toys'. Another company, Autocraft / DGM acquired many of the dies for early Morestone Series models and reintroduced various motorcycles.

Earlier models said "Morris & Stone" on the boxes, but the name was late. contracted Models were also marketed as promotionals for ESSO. The "Budgie" name was introduced in 1959 and was more like other British toys named after dogs and other animals (Husky and Corgi, etc.)

The company was acquired by S. Guiterman in 1961, but went out of business in 1966. After this, Modern Products kept making some of the Budgie models until 1969. Also after 1966, some slightly altered Budgie models were produced for the H. Seener Ltd. company, a toy distributor who had acquired tooling for many Budgie models. Later models were produced by Corgi in Swansea, Wales, under the Seerol name until the late 1990s. Modern Products, H. Seener, and Seerol made models mainly for the London tourist market. For example, later versions of the Budgie Rolls-Royce Silver Cloud have "Budgie Models Made in England by H. Seener" on the base. A 1990s London Taxi box says, "Made for H. Seener; Packaged and distributed by Alan Wenden Agencies, Langland, Swansea". On the taxi itself it says, "Made in England for H. Seener" with "SEEROL" inscribed below it. Interestingly, the Seerol name does not appear on the packaging, and it says "Made in England" when it is not. Later, Starcourt bought dies from Modern Products, so considering all the company complexities, it took a while for Budgie Model production to truly cease. In 2017 the original dies for the matchbox size VW beetle and Microbus reappeared under new ownership and are being offered online by the creator of DG copy models, Dave Gilbert under the budgie models website.

== Horse-drawn vehicles ==
Early Morestone Modern Product toys were a variety of agricultural, truck and automotive vehicles. Often horse-drawn vehicles were common – in particular a couple of stagecoaches. One of these was a more European squarish style "Ye Olde Coach & Four", the four being four horses (usually two brown and two gray) with driver and trunk. Also in a more European style was the more ornate single horse "Gypsy Caravan". One variation had a yellow body with red details and a green roof. Diecast metal wheels were often painted gold. Another American style "Stage Coach" came with either two or four horses. The coach, rigging, chest, horses and driver were all made of zamac. This more-rounded coach came in "Wild West", "Wells Fargo", or "Kansas to Texas" (return from the cattle drive?) styles. With four horses these coaches were about 5 to 6 inches (13 to 15 cm) long.

A similar vehicle also was the four-horse, American-style covered wagon, available with material canopy and side water barrels. The canopy ("hood") was sometimes plain and sometimes imprinted with cowboy and Native American design. Over the years, boxes also came in a variety of colors. Later offerings of this covered wagon were "Hawkeye, the Last of the Mohicans", and "Walt Disney's Davey Crockett". This wagon normally appeared with four detachable horses, but at times came with six. Another smaller three-inch (76 mm) covered wagon was also offered.

Other horse-drawn vehicles were a single-horse wheeled "Sam's" coffee stall, a horse-drawn snack bar, a single-occupant horse-drawn Hansom Cab, and Santa's sleigh with single reindeer. Additionally available was a smaller State Landau elaborate coach with six horses, but the finish was a bit cruder, and the horses were not detachable.

== Model details ==
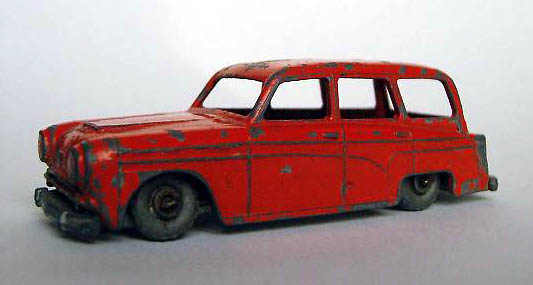
Morestone/Budgie Austin Westminster Countryman estate

Morestone cars in the 1950s were painted a variety of non-metallic colors, and often were two toned paint. Their wheels were most often plain silver metal. 1960s Budgie cars and trucks were reminiscent of Matchbox, though slightly smaller, with less detail, and simpler with plain paint and no windows. It seems the detail increasingly required to satisfy Matchbox and Hot Wheels' toy-hungry children was something Budgie had problems keeping up with. The Morestone, Modern Product and ESSO series toys were a smaller scale and were the more common; some trucks and motorcycles were a bit larger scale, somewhat like Corgi Toys or Dinkys.

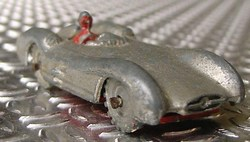
Morestone Mercedes-Benz W196 Grand Prix Car

Despite the simplicity, some models and their liveries could be quite clever, and Morestone/Budgie's forte seemed to be in selecting unique subjects not manufactured by other companies. Distinct cars and smaller vehicles were wheeled air compressors, a tandem bicycle with two metal 'riders' and sidecar, a 1953 Packard Clipper convertible, a 1957 Plymouth Belvedere convertible, and a 1967 Oldsmobile 98 'town sedan'. In trucks and construction, notable were the Morris "Budgie Service" breakdown lorry, the ERF low loader with electrical cable spools on the trailer, the strangely shaped ERF-articulated, mobile traffic "Jumbo" control unit, the Leyland tanker truck labeled with the phrase "You'll feel a lot better if you drink milk", or the R.E.A. Express Montpelier Urban Van with appropriate budgerigar illustrated on the van's sides. One intriguing model was the Thornycroft Amazon salvage lorry with crane which raises and swivels – the model also features a separate auxiliary engine. Another would be the early-1960s GMC delivery van with Hertz markings or the Bedford tipper truck with "Ham River Grit" written on the sides.

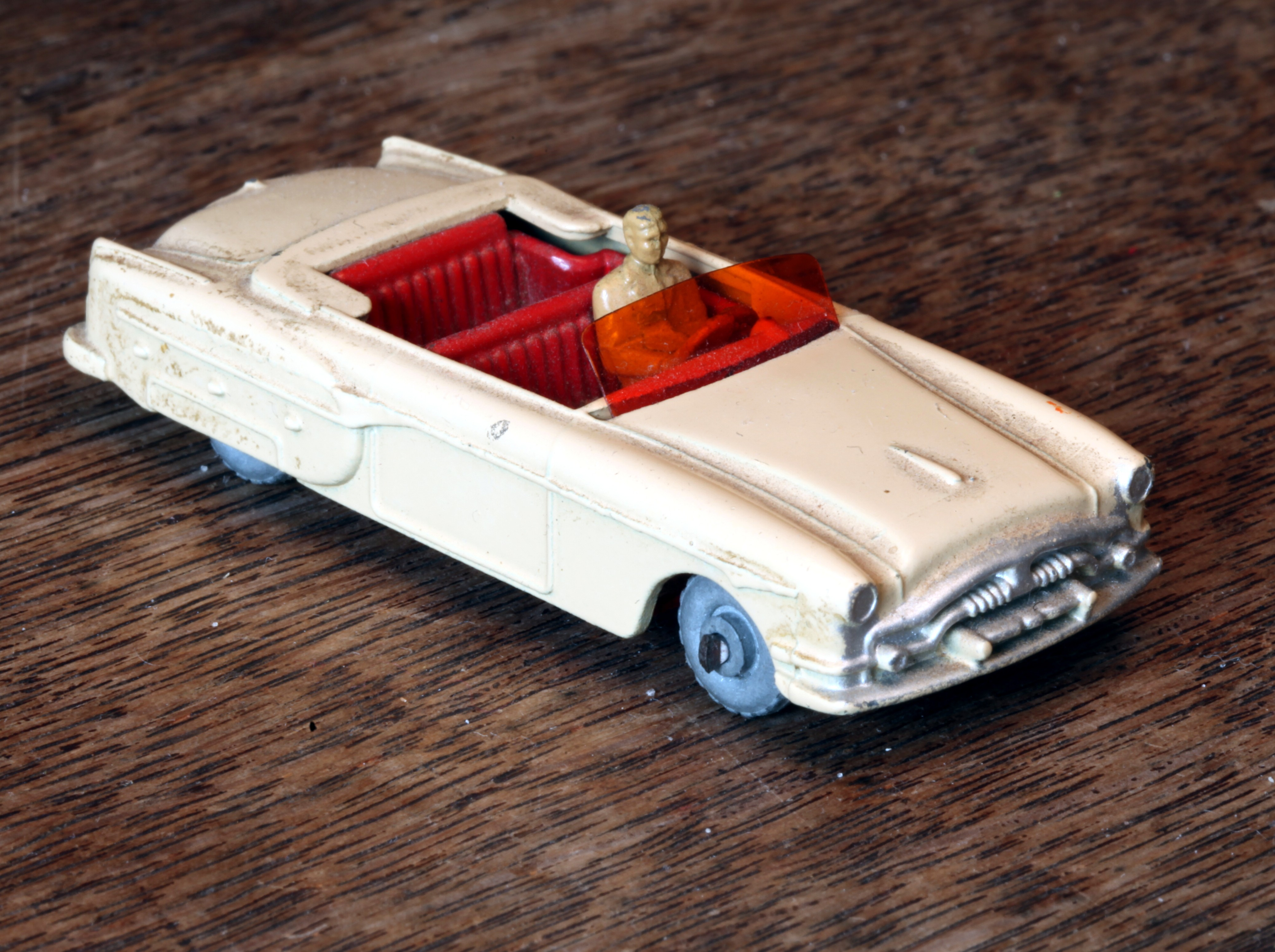
Budgie Packard convertible

One assembly detail different on Morestone/Budgie models, compared to other manufacturers, is the painting of wheels after they have been attached to axles. The appearance of painted 'hubs' at times makes a buyer wonder if the model has been 'retouched' by a collector, but this is factory spec.

Before and after the Budgie name was introduced, the company also offered a line of Enid Blyton's 'Noddy' character figurines and vehicles. This included metal characters with wagons and bicycles of the wooden boy Noddy and his brownie friend, Big Ears.

== Packaging ==
Early packaging for stagecoaches, etc. would be marked "Morestone" and "Modern Products". Boxes were two parts; lid and bottom with staples closing the lid on each end. The lid was covered with a printed, rather monocolor, paper label.

Later, yellow and red boxes with white trim seem to have been "Modern" Products offerings only without any reference to Morestone or Budgie (which name was introduced in 1959). Whichever package was seen, the vehicles themselves often only said, "Made in England" along with their names and number on the metal bases – but no indication of manufacturer – making their manufacturer difficult to identify at times. Morestone/Budgie models are thus often mistaken for Matchbox toys. The goal may have been to make vehicles generically labeled for easier marketing under several different names: "Modern", "Morestone" or "ESSO".

As mentioned, ESSO petrol was a main sponsor and its distinctive oval sign appears on many Morestone models. ESSO-themed packaging was a main theme of the mid-1950s models and the boxes portrayed the name in 'portrait' style with box standing on end. Morestone's ESSO packaging is reminiscent of other companies that attempted to claim a market niche with unique box styles. Whereas Matchbox had 'Match'-boxes, Aurora had 'Cigar'-boxes, Charbens had little suitcases and Benbros had boxes that looked like TV sets, Morestone's ESSO line packaged vehicles in little boxes that looked like gas pumps. One side of the box looked like (with end flap open) the face of an 'ESSO-Extra' petrol pump with a gallons gauge, while opposite sides illustrated the toy. The box front states "ESSO Petrol Pump Series manufactured and produced by Morris & Stone (London) Ltd. by permission of the owners of the ESSO trademark". Stores were supplied with colorful ESSO display stands which held the 20 Morestone vehicles in the series. Buyers could get a free 'garage' by sending in coupons off of the boxes (which most certainly hinders the search for non-cut, perfectly boxed models).

Packaging c. 1960, after the Budgie name was introduced, consisted of pale yellow boxes with black flaps. Later, hanging blister packs were a pale-turquoise with a bright-orange stripe across the top. "Budgie" was written in bold white letters in the orange area with a budgerigar bird illustrated to the right. Selected models are listed on the back of the package. Other blister cards were yellow with black highlighting or red, white, and blue. Gift sets had pictures of young boys with the cars. Some Budgie blister cards reference Life magazine and distributed through The Toy House. The Toy House line of Budgie blister pack models were sold exclusively at 7-Eleven convenience store throughout the U.S. up until the early 1970s. This arrangement was similar to the Husky diecast line that sold exclusively in U.S. based Woolworth department stores. The packaging for these had more of a blue-and-white colored card with red lettering. The card carried both the logo for The Toy House and said, "Advertised in LIFE magazine".

The kiwi Midget Toys boxes took their design from the earlier Budgie / Modern Products boxes and their red and yellow colored panels.
