= Model car =

Scale model of car

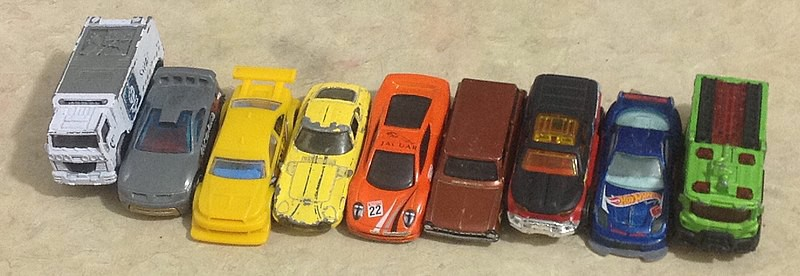
- Various Hot Wheels diecast vehicles
- Type: Toy car
- Company: various
- Country: various
- Materials: plastic, metal

A model car, or toy car, is a miniature representation of an automobile. Other miniature motor vehicles, such as trucks, buses, and ATVs, etc. are often included in this general category.

The model car kit building hobby became popular through the 1950s, while the collecting of miniatures by adults started to gain momentum around 1970. Precision-detailed miniatures made specifically for adults have been a significant part of the market since the mid-1980s.

The scope of the vehicles involved in the hobby, according to Louis Heilbroner Hertz author of The Complete Book of Building and Collecting Model Automobiles, encompasses "ordinary or stock automobiles, racing cars ([...]), buses, trucks, specialized service vehicles (especially fire engines), military vehicles, including such equipment as self-propelled gun carriers and mobile rocket launchers; construction equipment, including bulldozers and road rollers, tractors and related farm equipment; mobile showmen's engines, customized automobiles, hot rods, dragsters, the recently popular so-called 'funny cars', early self-propelled road carriages, and so on."

== History ==
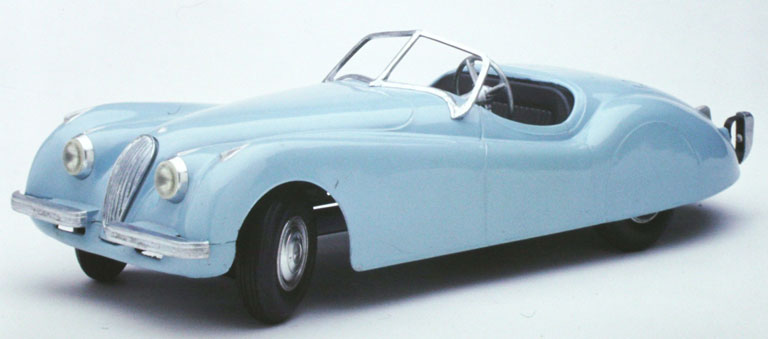
A diecast 1:10 scale Doepke Toys Jaguar XK120 from 1955. One of two car models the company made, this model is 17.5 in (440 mm) long. In The Children's Museum of Indianapolis.

Miniature models of automobiles first appeared in Europe around the time real automobiles did. Then, shortly after, they appeared in the United States. These were toys and replicas often made of lead and brass. Later models made in the early 20th century were either slush cast plaster or iron.

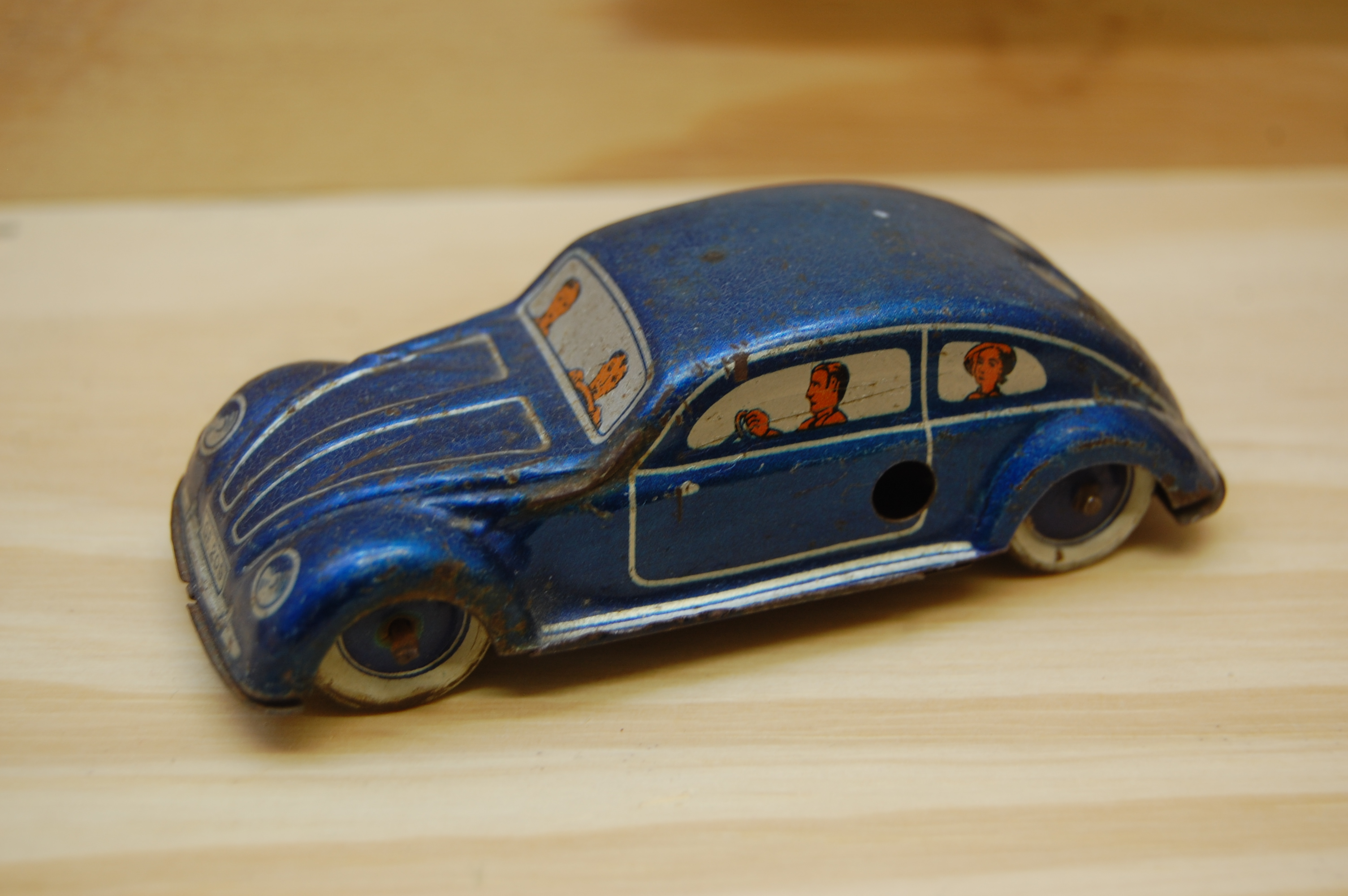
1940 KDF-wagen (Volkswagen Beetle) tin-plate toy, by the Nurenburg toymaker Georg Fisher,

Tin and pressed steel cars, trucks, and military vehicles, like those made by Bing of Germany, were introduced from the 1920s through the 1940s, but period models rarely copied actual vehicles, likely because of the crudeness of early casting and metal shaping techniques. Casting vehicles in alloys such as zinc-aluminum-magnesium-copper (trademarked as zamak) became popular in the late 1930s and remained prominent after World War II.

=== In-house model usage ===
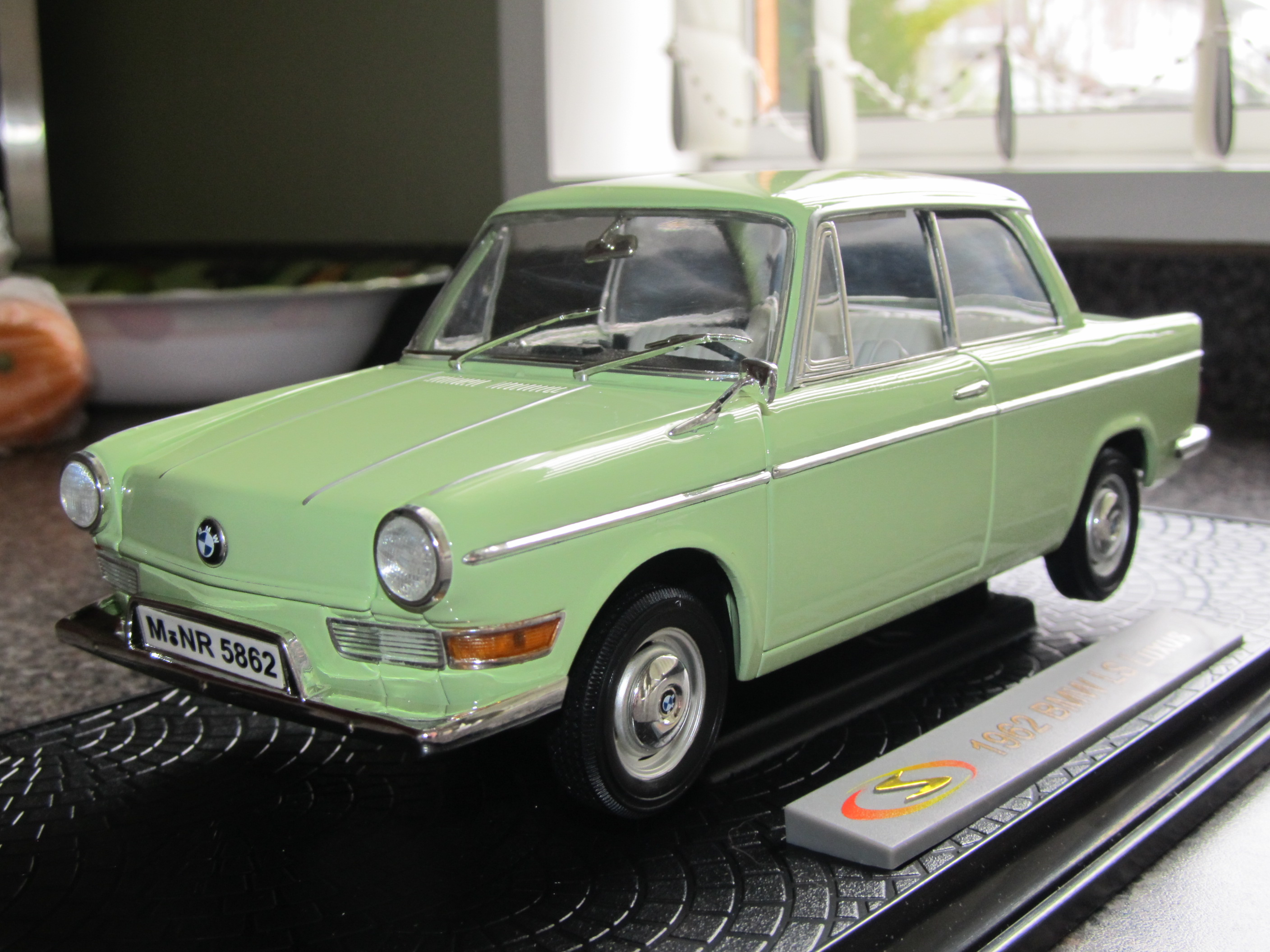
A model of a 1962 BMW 700 LS Luxus.

Many early model cars were not intended either as toys or for collecting. By the 1920s, the manufacturers of real automobiles would design and construct scale as well as full-sized models for design or promotion. Citroën of France, for example, began making its own models for promotional purposes as early as 1923. Sometimes, styling or concept models were made of wood or clay, often in 3/8 scale. From 1930 until 1968, General Motors sponsored the Fisher Body Craftsman's Guild Competition where hundreds of modelers competed for scholarship money.. The emphasis was on earning recognition for creativity, which could lead to possible employment as an industry stylist.

In-house models could also be precise replicas made from materials similar to the real vehicles. For example, Hudson Motor Car Company made twelve precisely crafted 1/4 scale replicas of its 1932 vehicles for promotion at the 1932 New York Auto Show (see Hudson display models). About the same time, but in a different vein, Studebaker made a wooden model of a cabriolet over twice the size of the real car. The vehicle was stationary on the company grounds and large enough to hold a whole band that played mostly for photo shoots. As time went by, companies in the United States, Europe and Asia made, provided, or sold toys or precision promotional models to attract succeeding generations to their products. More models also displayed advertising on their bodies for non-automotive promotions.

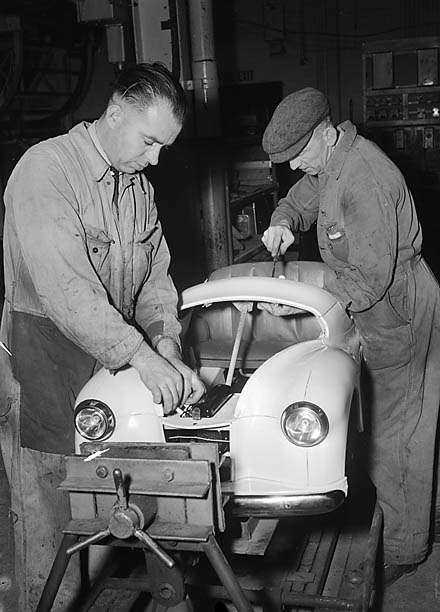
Austin toy pedal cars being manufactured at the Longbridge plant.

=== Scale sizes ===
The scales of toy and model cars vary according to historical precedent, market demand and the need for detail. Professional modelers make many 'in house' models of real car companies in full size, or at very large scales like 1:4, 1:5, 3:8, or 1:10 to portray adequate features and proportions. For toys, many European pre-war cars and trucks were made to display with railroad layouts, making 1:87 (1 to 2 inches, or HO scale) or 1:43 (about 4 inches long, or O scale) common scales. Other companies made vehicles in variations around 1:40 to 1:50 scales. Some companies went smaller to appeal to younger children (about 1:64 scale, or about 3 inches), which improved profit margins by packaging more items per carton and increasing profit per vehicle sold. Others moved to larger scales from 1:43 toward 1:40, 1:38 or 1:35. Later, popular scales went even larger. In the United States, 1:25 (6 to 7 inches) became the staple size for plastic promotional models, while European manufacturers adopted 1:24 or 1:18 (about 9 inches long). The larger 1:12 scale was occasionally seen and, more rarely, 1:10 or 1:8. At the other extreme, some very tiny toys since the 1980s were fairly accurate down to about 1:120 (a little over an inch).

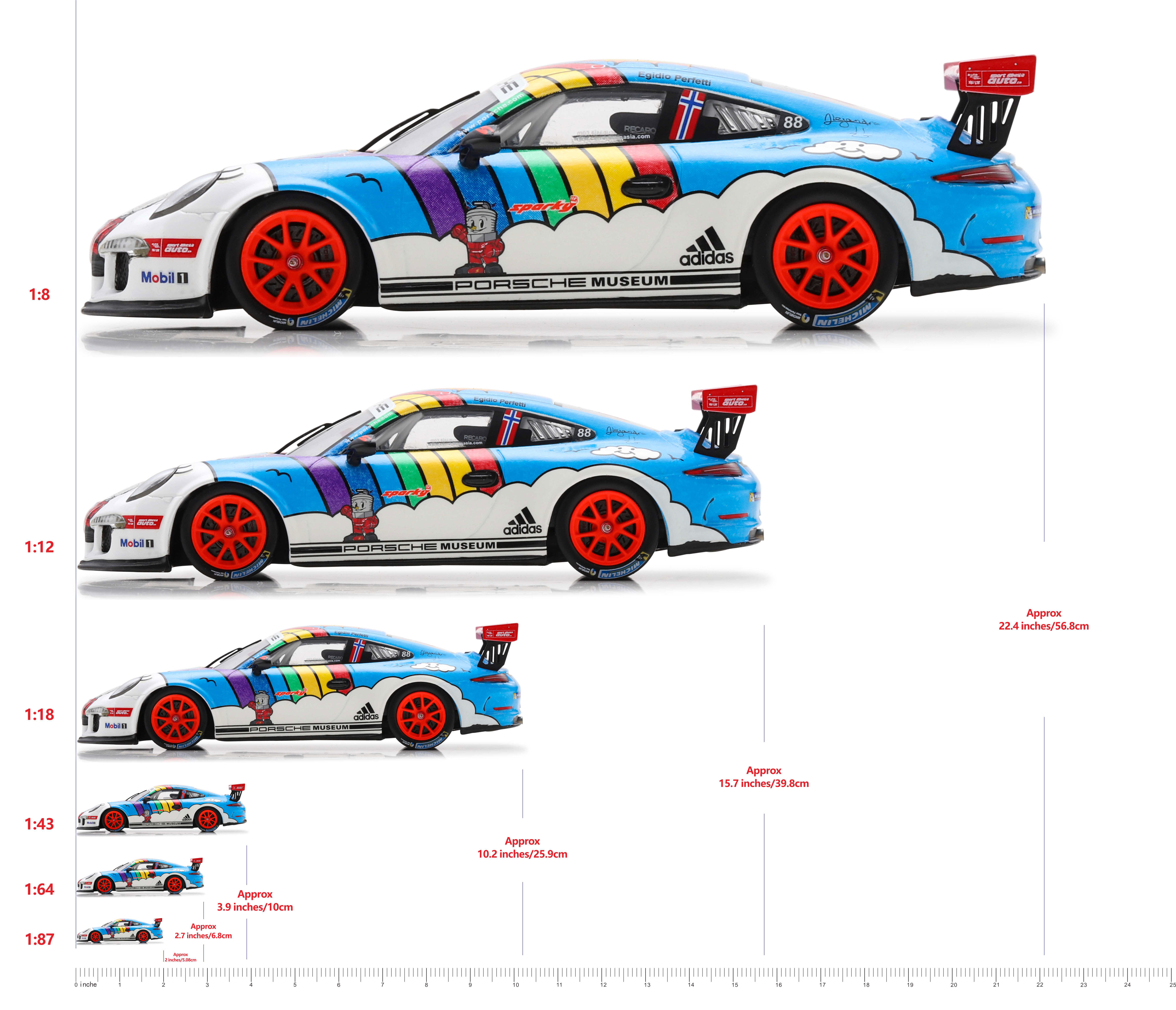
Models from Spark, 6 different scales

=== Materials and markets ===
Toys in the United States were almost always simpler castings of zinc alloy (zamak), pressed steel, or plastic, and often castings of only seven parts (a car body, four plastic wheels, and two axles) – while more complex plastic and zamak models in Europe often had precision detail and more working features. This provides instruction on different regions of the world and their varied cultures, markets, labor and economies.

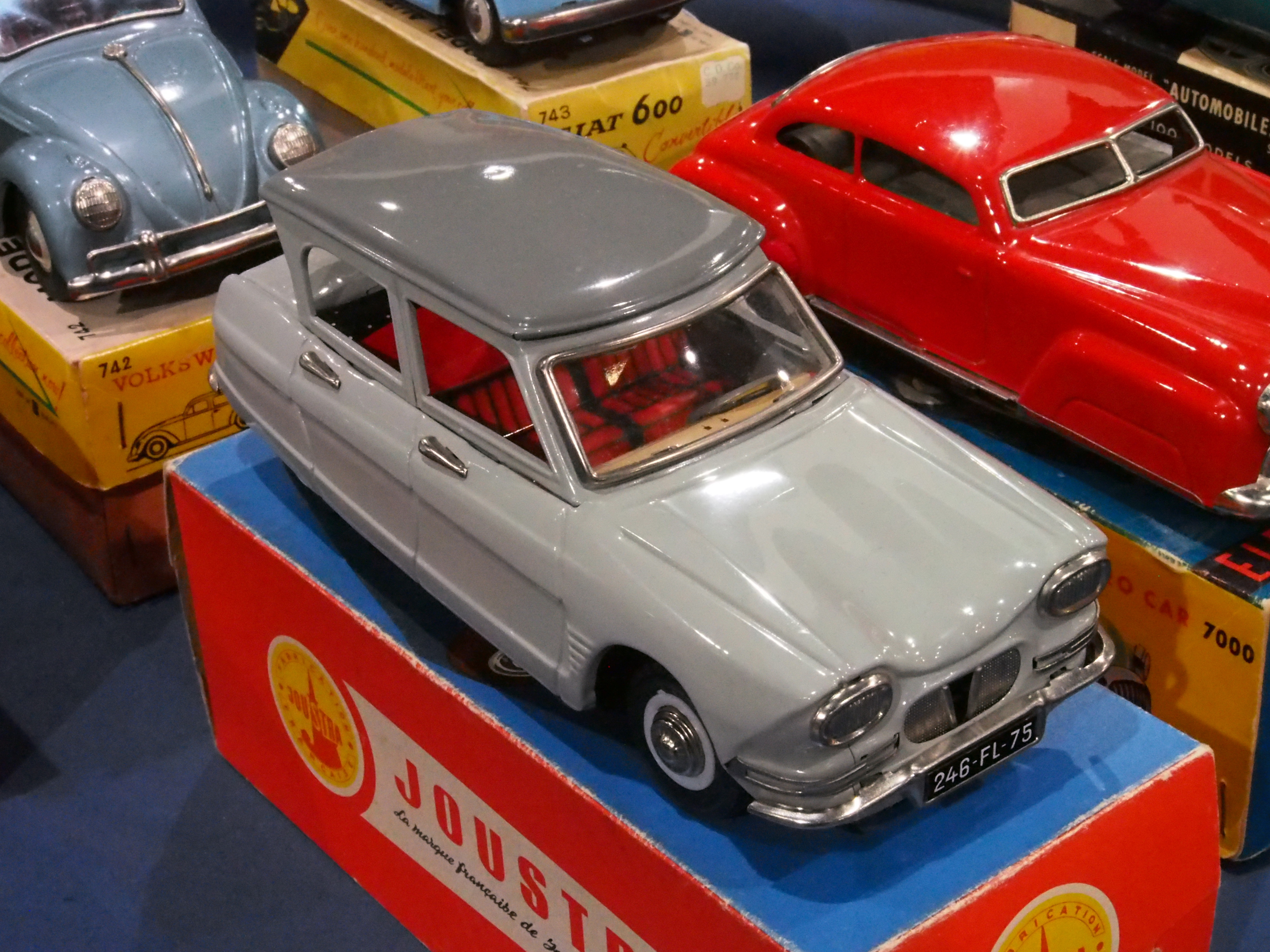
Citroen Ami 6 pressed tin toy.

Europe quickly developed niche marketing after World War II. The greater availability of labor there generally allowed the development of relatively complex toys to serve different markets in different countries. In the United States, limited labor availability prevented the production of complex toys with opening doors, hoods, and fully detailed interior, so they were often single castings with few parts. Sophistication in America did come in the form of detailed (but simply cast) promotional models for automotive dealerships, which preceded the appearance of automotive kits for assembly.

== European die casting ==
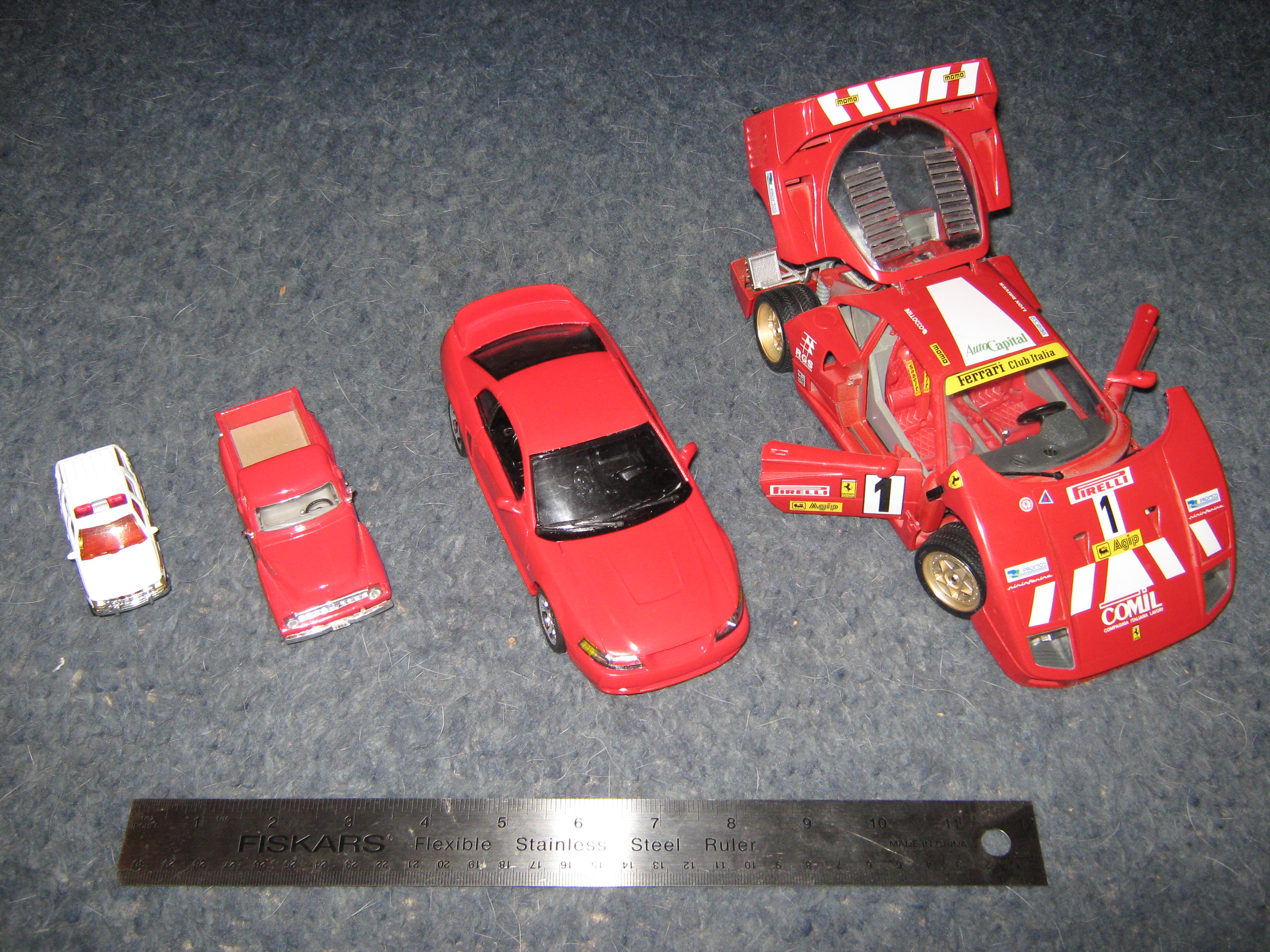
Die cast model cars in a variety of scales. Left to right: 1:64 Chevrolet Tahoe, 1:43 1953 Ford F-100, 1:25 1999 Ford Mustang Cobra, 1:18 1987 Ferrari F40.

Among more collectible vehicles in Europe after World War II and during the 1950s, smaller scales, like 1:43 and 1:64, were generally popular first. Since the 1980s, many factory assembled scale model cars made of diecast metal have become increasingly adult collectible oriented and less and less toy-like. Besides the smaller scales, these models are manufactured in various scales such as 1:12, 1:18, and 1:24.

=== Early European diecast ===
Northern Europe and the British Isles were the homes of the most successful European producers in the 1950s and 1960s in the post-war revitalized economies across the continent (Rixon 2005, p. 9). Quite popular were models produced in the altered railroad modeling scale of 1:43.

Examples of well-known companies are (or were) Corgi Toys, Dinky Toys, Matchbox, and Spot-On Models of the United Kingdom; Solido, Norev, and Majorette of France; Schuco Modell, Gama, and Siku of (West) Germany; Tekno of Denmark, and Mercury, Polistil and Mebetoys of Italy. Immediately post-war, Belgium made Septoy and Gasquy. Even Israel got into the act quite successfully with Gamda Koor Sabra, which made its own tooling for several unique models. Non-market system communist countries also had some successful factories, like Kaden models and Igra of Czechoslovakia, Espewe of East Germany, and Estetyka of Poland. State factories of the Soviet Union (commonly known as Novoexport, Saratov, or Tantal) produced many carefully crafted diecast models, mostly in 1:43 scale. These were known for their intricate detail, numerous parts, and delicate construction.

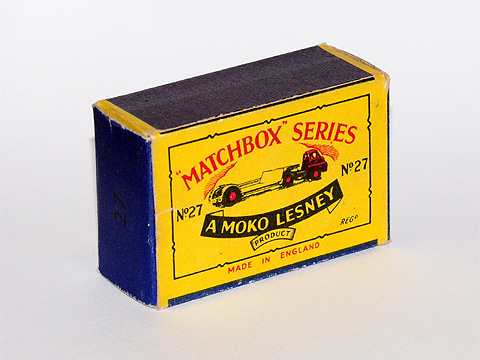
Moko Lesney flat bed truck box. Reproduction boxes can sometimes be difficult to spot.

Larger die-cast sizes grew out of offerings from European companies like Polistil, Schuco Modell, and Martoys, which later became Bburago. 1:24 and 1:18 scales did not become really popular until the late 1980s, when other brands like Yatming and Maisto were produced in Hong Kong or China by either American or Asian companies. 1:87 scale plastic vehicles, whether related to railroad modeling or not, continue to be popular in Europe. Despite the continued presence of the European companies, today, China is the center of diecast production. Post-war European diecast models were produced in fairly simple form, such as Dinky Toys (often in the train related 1:64 or 1:43). Dinky production began in 1934, while Matchbox cars (often approx. 1:64) were introduced in the mid-1950s. These early die-cast toys featured no opening parts whatsoever. Affected by market forces and by improvements in production technology, companies began to improve the toy quality over time. The "best" improvements were often copied by the competition within 1–2 years of their market debut. Examples of these would include plastic windows, interiors, separate wheel/tire assemblies, working suspensions, opening/moving parts, jeweled headlights, mask-spraying or tampo-printing, and low-friction 'fast' wheels.

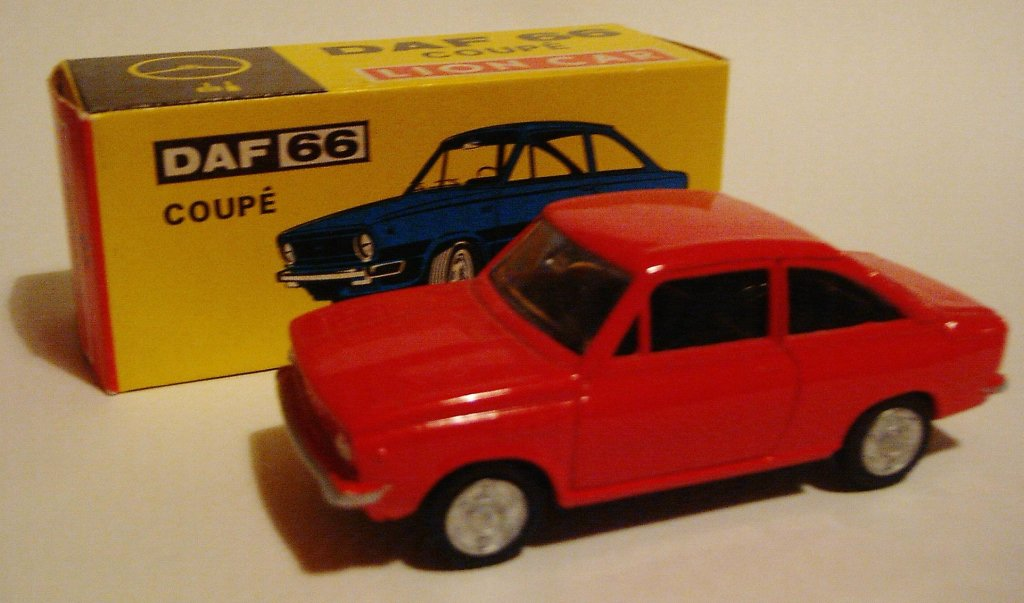
Lion Toys DAF 66 Coupe model.

Into the 1970s, model makers began to feel the squeeze of rising costs. Often, press tooling for a new model might cost more than 30,000 pounds (more than US$50,000). Companies began to offer fewer new issues and the models became simpler with fewer opening parts.

=== Trends in toy detail ===
Larger 1:24 and 1:18 scale premium models became extremely popular at toy and hobby centers during the 1990s, but are less popular circa 2010. This size is generally made with close attention to the details of the real vehicles, such as working steering, and opening doors, trunk/boot, and hood/bonnet. Detailed interiors, instrument panels, trunks/boots with spare tires, and engine compartments are common. Chassis often show intricacies of exhaust systems and suspensions. A working suspension system is often included. In smaller scales, some of the details are often eliminated, so in 1:43, 1:64, or 1:87 scale cars, working steering is not common. Likewise, only the front doors and hood might open, with non-opening rear doors and trunk. (There are exceptions, of course, such as the steering by lever on the late 1960s 3 inch Ford Mustang by Matchbox or the patented steering on 1:32 Modarri toy cars.)

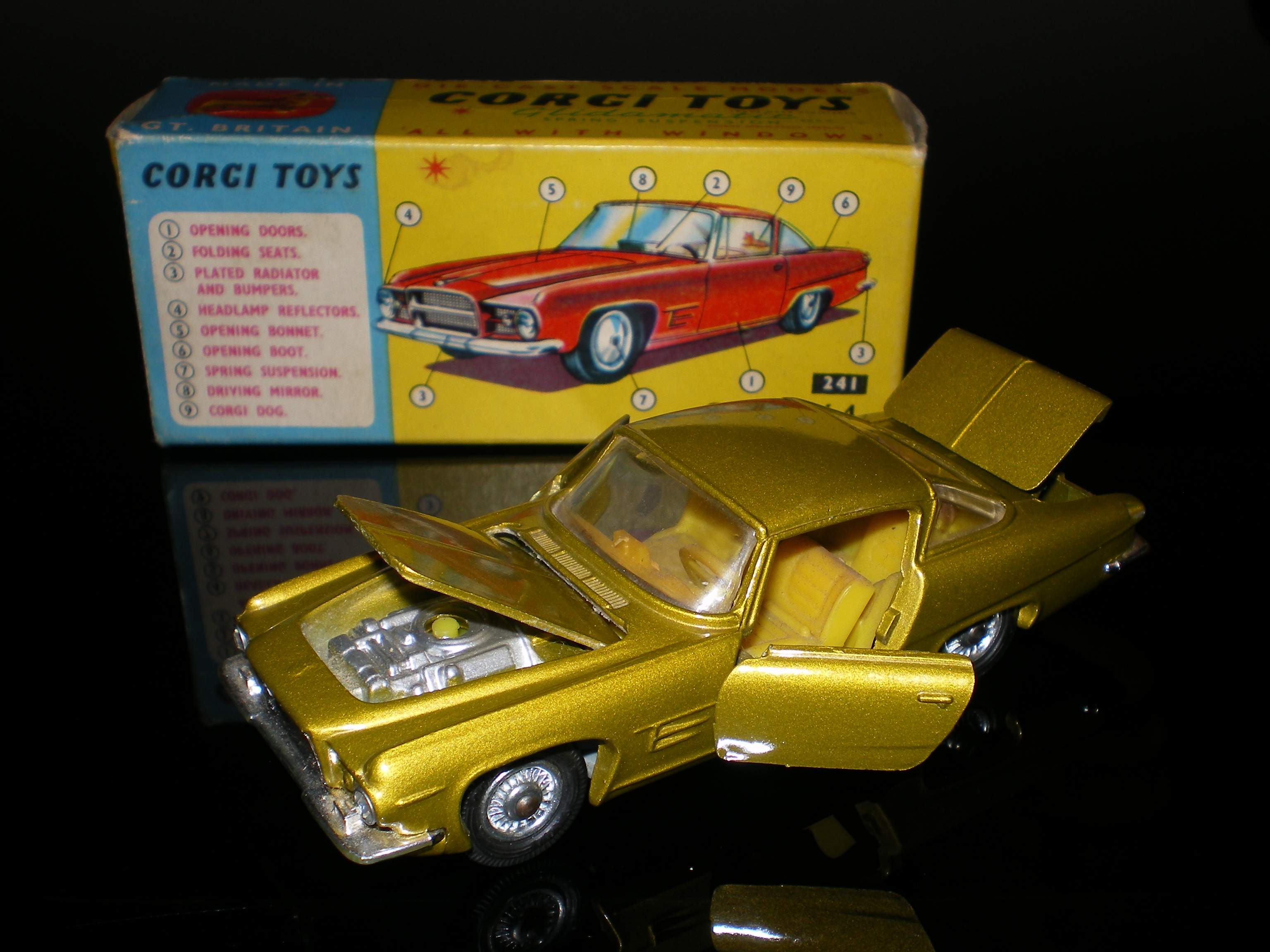
Corgi Dual-Ghia model.

Over time, market pressures have led to further changes in how models are designed and manufactured. In the 1960s, many European models had opening parts and working components, but today, few of the smaller scale toys do. More working parts mean more production expense, and Hot Wheels and Matchbox vehicles now rarely have such features. Today, the number of moving parts has been reduced even in large-scale models. For example, premium model maker AUTOart introduced a line of race and sports cars in 1:18 scale with no opening parts.

=== Die cast seconds ===
Also notable is the diffusion of model dies to companies in other countries which could not afford tooling expenses for their own new lines. Traditionally, when European companies have finished marketing their models, newer dies are developed and introduced, and older dies are sold off to other companies, often in less developed countries.

As early as about 1970, Dinky tooling became 'Nicky' Toys in India, just as older Matchbox models became 'Miltons' or Corgi dies became 'Maxwell'. Many dies previously made by Corgi, Efsi, Tekno, Sablon or Solido trekked southward in Europe to Spanish or Portuguese companies like MetOsul, Nacoral or Auto Pilen. Politoys became MacGregor in Mexico and also showed up in plastic in the Soviet Union. Earlier, Solido and Schuco died and made their way to Brazil. Even some of Mattel's earlier Hot Wheels tooling showed up in Argentina as Muky. Tomicas became Yat Mings, Tomicas and Yat Mings became Playarts, and Matchbox tooling reappeared in other forms in many places.

The trend is nearly always a diffusion from more industrialized to somewhat lesser industrialized countries and often the result is poorer paint, faulty zamac alloys, and imprecise assembly. One example was the copies of Italian Ediltoys made by Meboto in Turkey. The Argentine Mukys featured paint that was flat and dull, unlike the bright colors of the original Hot Wheels. At the other extreme, Auto Pilen of Spain was an exception and copied models beautifully. These were as good as, or sometimes better, than the original Dinkys or Solidos in quality and paint.

== Collecting ==
Organized collecting of model cars developed shortly after the models first appeared on the market. Even before companies such as Corgi and Dinky were ten years old, adults were collecting them, particularly in the UK and the USA. Often, as well, adults seek the joys of childhood, collecting what they destroyed in youth or what their parents threw away. This also lead to the foundation of the Diecast Hall of Fame in 2009.

=== Adult collectors ===
Many manufacturers began catering to the adult collector market. In the late 1960s and early 1970s, David Sinclair in Erie, Pennsylvania, was important in bringing new, more sophisticated, and rarely produced years and makes to the United States. Model brands like Rio, Western Models, Brooklin, Idea3 and Pirate Models were sold to adult collectors for the first time. Many of these were handmade in white metal in fewer numbers. Also in the early 1970s, craftsmen like Carlo Brianza and Michelle Conti started making ultra-detailed, large replicas in Italy and Spain – costing hundreds or even thousands of dollars. In addition, the company Pocher, from Italy, made extremely complex kits in 1:8 scale

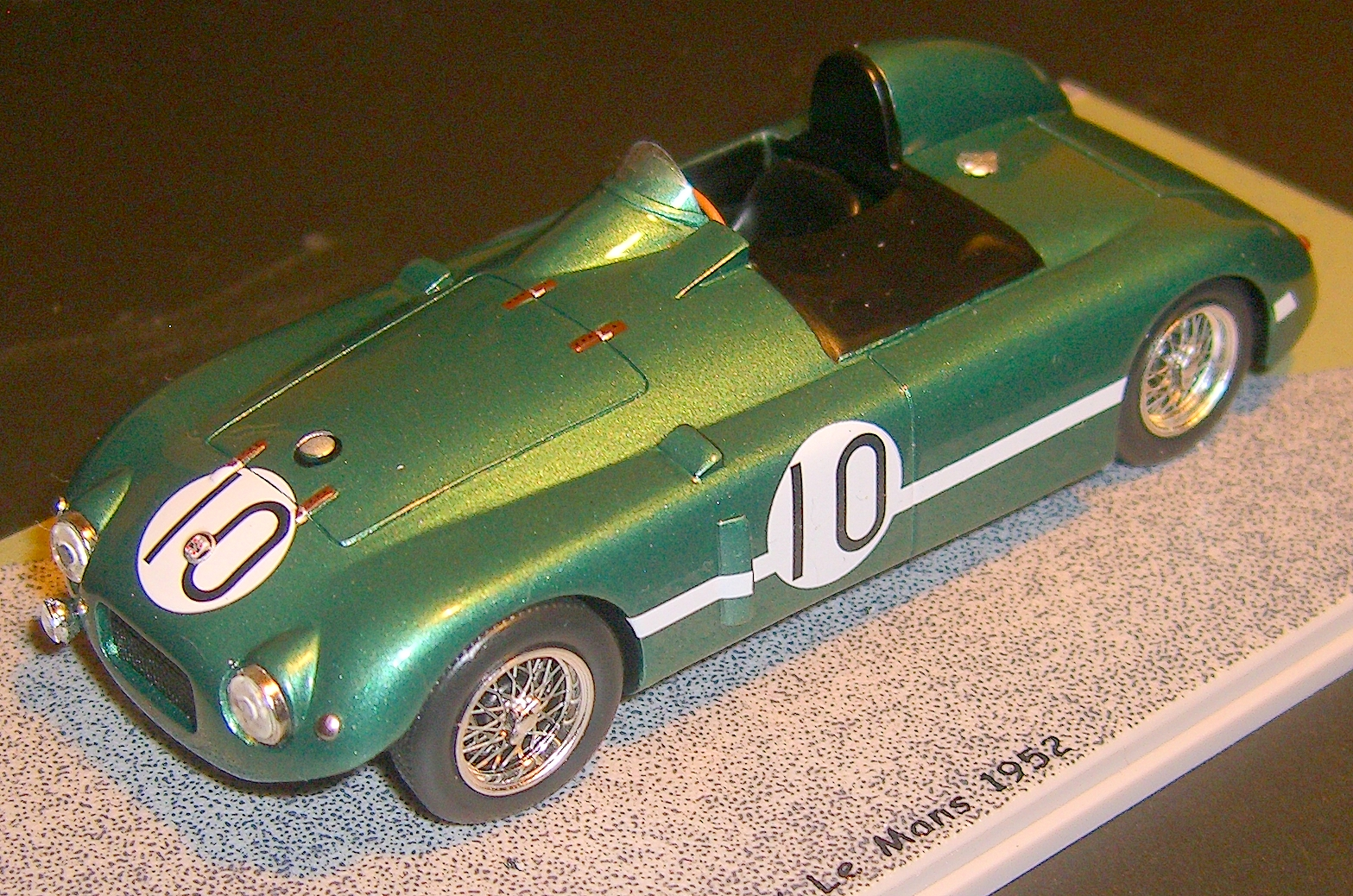
1952 Nash-Healey LeMans model.

Around the early 1990s, many began to collect and record vehicle variations in miniature (in a manner similar to stamp or coin collecting), which led to rising values, especially for rare models (for example, see Parker 1993). This led to mass producers such as Matchbox (specifically with its Models of Yesteryear series) and Corgi intentionally catering to a higher-price market segment with exclusive 'limited editions' of collectible vehicles. Thus, this smaller movement in the late 1960s and early 1970s gradually gave rise to a huge premium market segment by the early 1990s.

=== Licensing ===
The collectors' market also revealed licensing aspects that were not known until the 1980s. In the 1950s and 1960s, models were produced spontaneously without licensing agreements, and real auto manufacturers saw it as free advertising. Today, model companies have licensing arrangements with real car manufacturers to make replicas of their products, whether they be concepts, cars in current production, or models no longer produced.

Licenses appear on models where model car manufacturers enter similar licensing agreements. Licenses are expensive, which enhances the position of mass producers of model cars, while smaller companies have been marginalized and forced out of business. For example, when Ferrari entered into an exclusive agreement with Mattel's Hot Wheels, companies like Solido and Bburago felt the crunch, and Bburago went out of business (though the name was eventually reacquired by Maisto).

=== Collectible manufacturers and locations ===
Manufacturers focusing on premium models, usually in white metal and sometimes resin, include Brooklin Models, Western Models, Enchantment Land, Conquest / Madison, Durham Classics, Elegance Models, Mini Auto Emporium, Mini Marque, Motor City USA, Tron, Starter, RacingModels, SMTS and Victory. Several of these started production in the 1970s and 1980s and were handmade in the United States, Canada, or England, with occasional constructors in France, Belgium, or the Netherlands. A couple of geographical oddities include Goldvarg (made in Argentina) and some early Milestone Models, which were made in South Africa. Mail order companies like Franklin Mint and Danbury Mint also focus on the collector market, though in a more popular vein.

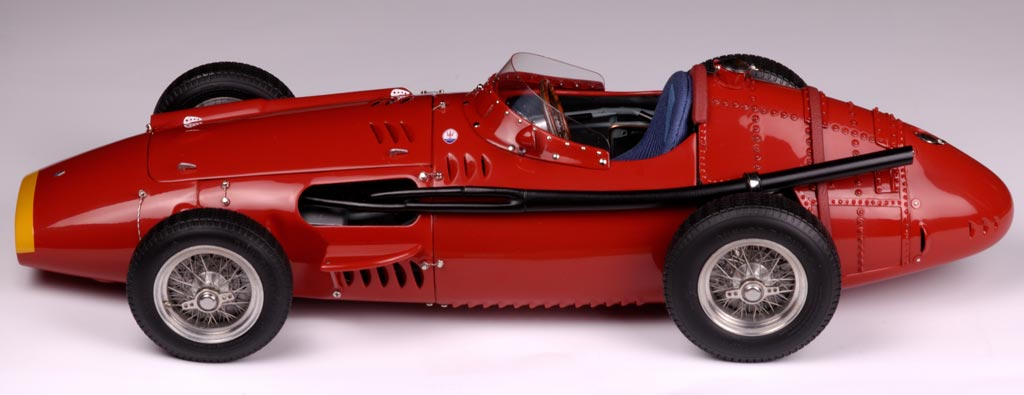
Maserati 250 Grand Prix model.

Since 2000, more than fifty different diecast, resin, and white metal manufacturers in England, France, Italy, Ukraine, and Russia have exploded onto the adult collector market. These include Spark which focus on motorsport such as 24h Le Mans and F1, Bizarre is the brand dedicated to the unusual and extraordinary in the car world, FDS, YOW Modellini (from Japan) and many others. Companies like Altaya, Ixo, and Model Car World (for example, with its White Box line) have been started in Europe – with production increasingly seen in China. Many of these producers have focused on global auto marques producing vehicles that were produced in Russia or Brazil. Some of these companies only produce kits – others produce kits and build them up to order. Still others are professional kit builders, who do not produce the kits themselves.

== Promotional models ==
Promotional models are sometimes used when real auto manufacturers contract with model or toy companies to produce replica of their real vehicles. Some of the earliest promotional models were from the early 1930s, when TootsieToy introduced a line of 1932 Grahams and later, the 1935 LaSalle. These were both diecast and made available in boxes with the brand name displayed with appropriate logos and colors (Seeley, No Date). National Products made models of about 1/28th scale starting in 1934. Later manufacturers like Winross, Lesney Matchbox, Lledo, AHL, and White Rose used their toy vehicles to advertise logos on their flanks promoting various companies.

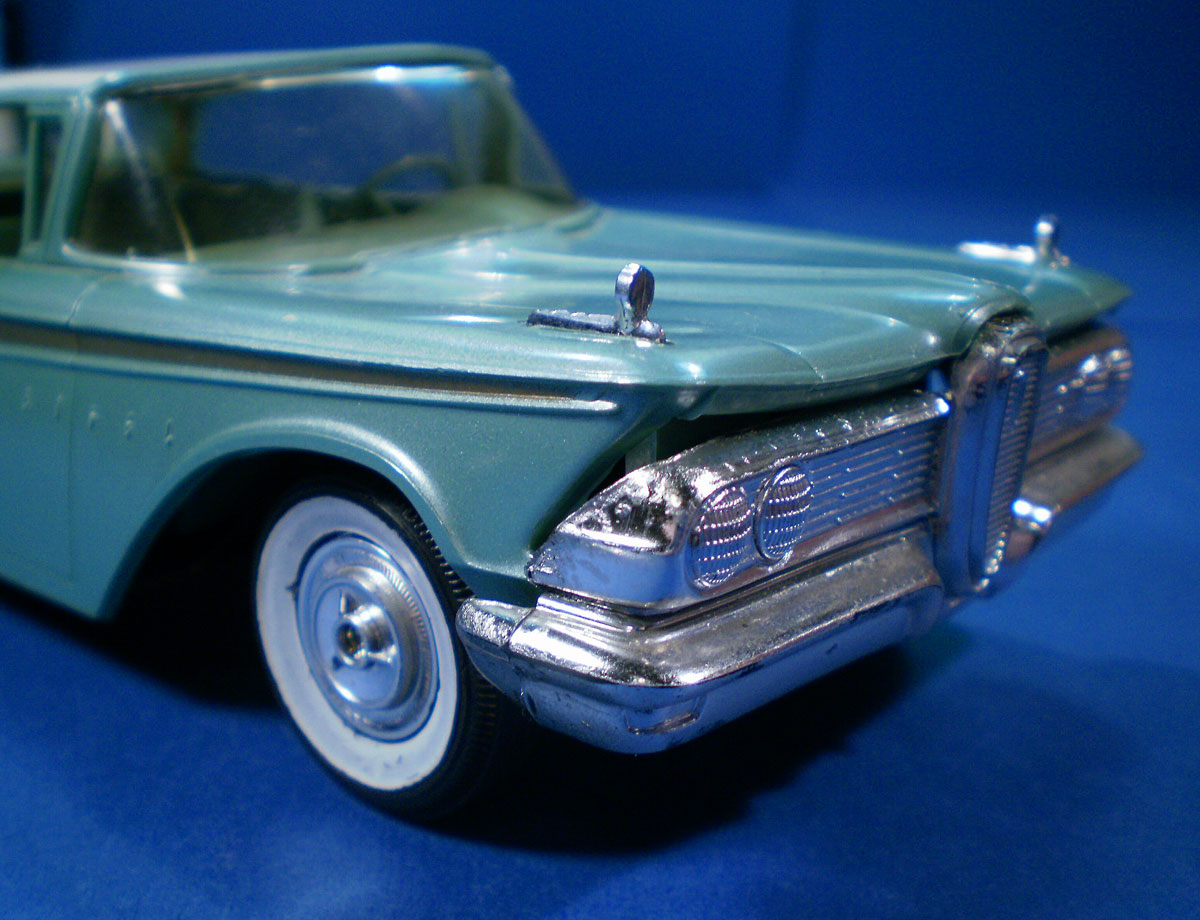
1:25 scale 1959 Edsel with typical warping of acetylene plastic.

In the U.S., Banthrico started producing diecast promotional model car banks in the late 1940s for the banking industry. These coin-banks were available as gifts to customers who opened a new account and had a slot in the bottom to put their spare change. Usually the bank's name and address was painted on the roof of the car. Banthrico models were also painted in authentic Big Three colors and used as "paint chips" so dealers could gauge the upcoming colors on real models. These primitive promotionals included Buicks, Cadillacs, Lincolns, Packards, DeSotos, Chryslers, Dodges, Ramblers and the more common Chevrolets and Fords.

In the United States, the word 'promo' is usually associated with 1:25 scale plastic, pre-assembled models. In Europe, promotionals were made in smaller vehicle sizes in diecast zamac in 1:32, 1:43, or 1:50 scales. In the case of Chrysler's later Turbine Car, where 50 real cars were put into consumer use, the model by Jo-Han was widely distributed as a good will gesture by Chrysler, though the Turbine was never actually marketed.

In Japan, promotional models from the late 1950s until the 1970s were typically cast in pot metal and given a chrome or gold finish; they typically doubled as cigarette holders and ash trays.

=== The plastic promo ===
About the time Banthrico was declining as a promotional maker, two companies, PMC and Ideal Models (later to become Jo-Han) were introducing plastic promotional models to the public. Similar to metal model producer Banthrico, PMC also made many in the form of banks. Many Chevrolet bank models had the inscription on the bottom "To help save for a rainy day, or to buy a new Chevrolet." The scale for these cars was 1:25, however a few Chevrolets and Plymouths were produced in a larger 1:20 scale. Other less well known plastic companies like Lincoln Line, Cruver or Burd Manufacturing, made the occasional promotional model though cars may not have been the company's specialty.

AMT began producing assembled 1/25 friction and coaster models in 1948. These were mostly promotional models manufactured for automobile dealers. Youngsters would be given the scale models to play with while the parents and the salesman haggled. Collecting and trading these "promos" soon became a popular hobby. AMT soon took control of SMP, another plastic promotional model producer. By 1960, Wisconsin-based PMC ceased to produce promo models, though continued to make toys.

Interest in the hobby peaked during the 1950s and 1960s, with AMT, Jo-Han, and Model Products Corporation (MPC) as the primary promotional manufacturers.

Throughout, the promo producers were at the whim of the real automakers and would respond to requests of particular scales, paint colors, and other details like working suspensions or even, on occasion, detailed engines, or other opening features.

=== American promo details ===
These plastic models were intricately detailed, with body scripts, trim, and emblems, as well as dashboard details, exact duplicates of the real thing, in 1/25 scale. Typically, each automaker would license their cars to one or more model companies. Sometimes the contracts seemed piecemeal – for example in 1965, Chrysler had promos made by AMT, Jo-Han, and MPC. But often one of the BIG 3 favored a particular model maker. For example, Jo-Han produced most Chrysler products and Cadillacs and Oldsmobiles from GM, while AMT did the Chevrolet, Buick, Pontiac, and Fords. American Motors Corporation shared promotional duties between Jo-Han and AMT depending on the year. Also, contracts sometimes changed between companies for similar models almost on an annual basis. For example, Jo-Han uncharacteristically produced the 1972 Ford Torino, and MPC did full-size Chevrolets in the early and mid-1970s. While Jo-Han did Chrysler early on, MPC took on the pentastar in the mid-1970s. 1968 through 1970 Chevy Impala kits were made by both MPC and AMT, as were some Camaros. Trying to beat competition to market, sometimes a model company would make a 'guess' at a particular model for a member of the Big 3 for a particular year and thus get details wrong.

=== Marketing approaches ===
Commercial versions of the promos were also marketed and sold in retail stores like Zayre and Murphy USA from the early 1960s, up until around 1973. Differences from dealer promos were lack of manufacturer's official paint schemes and often the addition of a friction motor located on the front axle, noticeable by the studded white vinyl gear that protruded around the axle (and through the oil pan). However, they were painted and looked just as attractive as dealer promos.

Some model companies sold unassembled versions of the promo cars, that were typically simpler and easier to assemble than the annual kits (with engine and customizing parts available in the full-blown kits left out). They were molded in color (instead of the traditional white) and easily assembled without glue (thus no glue or paint was required). When assembled these were almost identical to the much more elite promotional models. What usually gives them away is that they were mostly molded in a brighter nonmetallic color without paint matched to official 'Big 3' colors. AMT's "Craftsman" series of promo-like models had perforations in the bodies for mirrors and antennae – thus the model's final appearance was not precisely like a promo (which would have had no custom parts attached to the body of the car). Probably, because of the promo look, however, today these often command higher prices than the detailed "3-in-1" kits, especially AMT's Craftsman series of the early and mid sixties.

After being owned for a time by Seville Enterprises, Okey Spaulding purchased once-defunct Jo-Han, which produced a few of its original Jo-Han models in limited quantities. These include the 1963 Chrysler Turbine Car, 1959 Rambler station wagon, and some of its original 1950s Oldsmobiles and Plymouths. However, he has had financial problems from the start, and there are no indications that he will be able to continue to produce the highly desired Johan line of models.

=== European promotionals ===
With the exception of some firms like Stahlberg which made larger scale plastic promotional models of Swedish Volvos and Saabs in an American style, European promotionals were usually based on the 1:43 or 1:32 scale diecast metal models produced as toys or collector's items, often brightly colored or with authentic tampo or silk screen liveries for commercial products. Companies commonly making promotionals in Europe have been NZG Models, Conrad Models, Gescha in Germany and Tekno and Emek Muovi in Denmark and Finland, respectively. Tekno was one of the first European companies to offer a wide variety of multiple promotional variations. Almost all European toy model brands had some kind of promotional service, but in Germany, 1:50 scale was, and remains very common for trucks. In the United States, such diecast companies are rare, but Winross Models and Pennjoy are a couple of European style examples which have had much success, particularly Winross which has been making models since the early 1960s.

Another variation on promotionals were whole toy lines or brands constructed to represent vehicles on display at particular automotive museums. Examples were Cursor Models of Germany which made models specifically on display in the Mercedes-Benz Museum in Sindelfingen, R.A.M.I. by J.M.K. of France which made vehicles in the Automobile Museum de Rochetaillée sur Saône in France, or also Dugu Miniautotoys of Italy which made vehicles for the classic automobile museum in Turin.

== Model kits ==
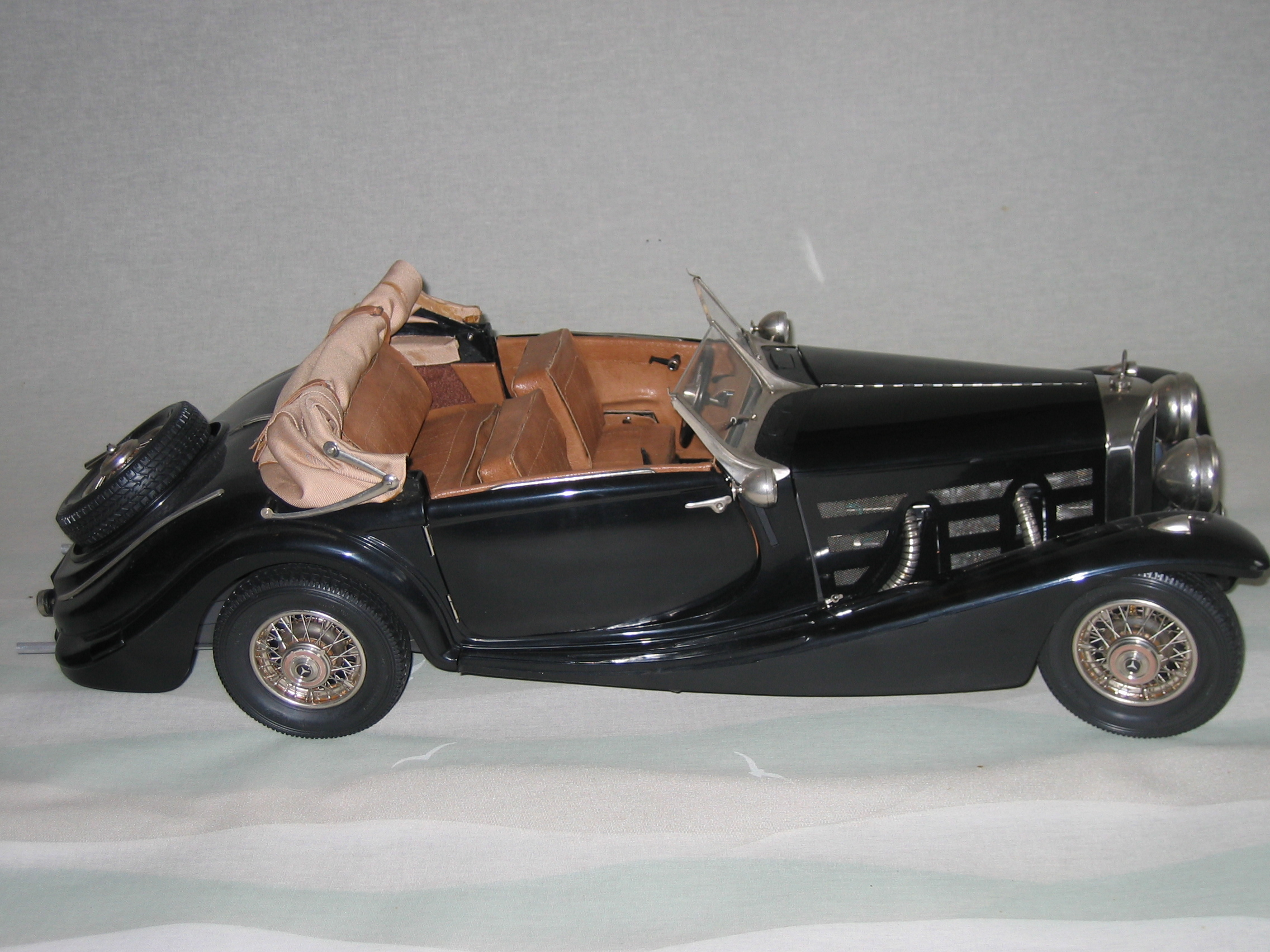
Pocher model of a Mercedes-Benz 500K.

Scale miniatures of real production vehicles, designed as kits for children or the enthusiast to construct, can be made of plastic, die-cast metal, resin, and even wood. In plastic model kits, parts are molded in single cast 'trees' with thin connections that can be easily severed for painting and assembly. Parts come molded in a variety of colors, white being the most common in the 1960s and 1970s. Some parts are chrome plated to simulate real bumpers, grilles, wheels, and other pieces that might be chrome on the actual vehicle. Tires are most commonly molded in rubber. Water 'slide-on' decals are usually included along with an instruction brochure.

Kits usually have high levels of accuracy when a model is complete. Major manufacturers are AMT, MPC, Revell, Monogram, and Tamiya. However, some plastics companies, like Aurora, Pyro, IMC, and Premier have since ceased productions of kits.

=== Pioneers ===
The model car "kit" hobby began in the post World War II era with Ace and Berkeley wooden model cars. Revell pioneered the plastic model car in the late 1940s with their Maxwell kit, which was basically an unassembled version of a pull toy. Derek Brand, from England, pioneered the first real plastic kit, a 1932 Ford Roadster for Revell. He was also known for developing a line of 1/32 scale model car kits in England for the Gowland brothers. These kits were later introduced by Revell in the U.S. as the "Highway Pioneers" Series of kits.

On the heels of the promotional model business, Aluminum Model Toys or AMT introduced model car kits in 1957. Jo-Han, Revell and Monogram also started producing model car kits about this same time. Most of these were known as "annual" kits, and were the unassembled kit version of the promotional models or 'promos' representing the new cars that were introduced at the beginning of each model year. As early as 1962, avid British collector Cecil Gibson had even written a book on plastic model cars. By the mid-1960s, plastic model kits had become more plentiful and varied, with increased level of detail. Typically, the kits often had opening hoods, separate engines and detailed suspension parts.

=== Customizers ===
The mid-1960s is generally considered the "golden age" of plastic model car kits. Many specialty modelers and customizers, famous for their wild creations, were hired by model companies to sponsor and create new kit designs. George Barris, Darryl Starbird, and the Alexander Brothers worked for AMT. Tom Daniel design vehicles for Monogram and Mattel. Dean Jeffries was employed by MPC. Bill Campbell created hippie monster designs for Hawk. Ed Roth, famous for his 'Rat Fink' was hired by Revell about 1962. Many of these customizers created real cars and had to have specialists convert their creations into model kit form.

Jim Keeler, a model kit designer for Revell, brought the world highly detailed model cars in the early sixties and is credited with bringing Ed Roth's famous hot rods and customs to the model car marketplace. He also designed Revell's Custom Car Parts which allowed kit builders to add engines, custom wheels and other custom features to existing models. Keeler later went on to Aurora Plastics and innovated the Prehistoric Scenes, which were highly detailed models of prehistoric dinosaurs. Many of Keelers kit designs are still being sold in the 21st century.

In addition to building them stock, most annual kits offered "3 in 1" versions which allowed the builder to assemble the car in stock, custom, or racing form. MPC joined the kit/promo business in 1965, and among their first annual kits/promos, was the full-size Dodge Monaco, which was released with a gold metallic plastic body and is a valuable collector's item today.

=== Decline and revival ===
Interest in model car kits began to wane in the mid-1970s, and while the precise causes are not perfectly clear, some factors were a sharp rise in the price of plastics, parents becoming cautious of 'glue sniffing' and, later, the rise of video gaming. A revival of sorts in the 1980s occurred with Monogram introducing NASCAR kits and AMT introducing several models that fans had requested.

New model specific magazines sprang up, such as Scale Auto Enthusiast, (now simply Scale Auto) and Model Cars Magazine!. These magazines spread the word, helped advertisers, and brought a new generation of modelers together from all across the country.

Many of the kits from the golden age of modeling have been reissued. Not only does this allow the craftsman to build the cars they always wanted (but couldn't obtain or afford), but it tends to lower the prices of the originals. In some cases, models of cars from the 1950s and 1960s have been issued with all-new tooling, which allows for even more detailing with modern kit design and manufacturing methods. These include AMT's 1966 Fairlane and 1967 Impala SS, and Monogram's 1967 Chevelle and 1965 Impala Super Sport.

Today, model car companies are still in business, fueled by this renewed interest. ERTL took over AMT and MPC which are now both under the Round 2 name. Revell and Monogram have merged. Modelers today can take advantage of modern technology, which includes photoetched details, adhesive chrome foil for chrome trim, wiring for engines, and billet-aluminum parts. Many builders today can construct a model so it resembles the real car in miniature, much more than could have been done with essentially the same kit more than forty years ago.

The internet has also fueled a growing modeling community through websites, online forums and bulletin boards, and sites that host photographs, allowing the hobby to expand internationally.

=== Japanese kits ===
Japanese model kit manufacturers – Tamiya, Fujimi, Aoshima, and Hasegawa, among them – also stepped up their presence in the U.S. market during the 1980s and 1990s. Lesser known kit manufacturers, at least in the United States, were Doyusha, Yamada, Nichimo, Otaki, Marui, Rosso, and Arii. Japanese kits are generally known for being ultra detailed and of very high quality. Most of the subjects of these companies are Japanese cars, both classic and current (and, of course, ships, planes and military vehicles). For example, Hasegawa and Aoshima make detailed models of the first-generation Toyota Celica, which has become somewhat of a classic. Nevertheless, Hasegawa also produced 1/25 scale models of 1965–66 American cars, including the 1965 Chevrolet Impala, and 1966 Buick Wildcat, Cadillac Coupe DeVille, and Thunderbird Landau. These were actually Johan and AMT kits that were simplified and modified for the Japanese market.

=== Short-run multimedia kits ===
Since the mid-1990s several companies including: Tameo, Studio 27, Model Factory Hiro, and Renaissance have issued hundreds of Sports Car and Formula 1 subjects in limited-run, multimedia kit sets. These so-called "multimedia" offerings consist of a combination of resin, white metal, photo-etch, and machined aluminum instead of inject plastic parts. The most popular scales are 1/43, 1/20, and 1/24. These multimedia kits are very high quality, require a wide set of construction skills to complete, and are marketed to international competition enthusiasts.

== Powered models ==
Though most car models are static display items, individual model builders have sometimes powered their vehicles in various ways, including rubber bands, springs, inertia mechanisms, electric motors, internal combustion engines, air engines and steam engines. In order to make them less fragile, powered models are often somewhat simplified and not as detailed as the best static models. For this reason, some modelers dismiss nearly all powered miniature cars as toys; however many individual efforts and commercial products are sufficiently well-scaled and detailed that they deserve to be called models. The main types of commercially produced powered car models include:

Uncontrolled powered models, which were developed in the 1930s and were common until the 1960s. Often guided by a rail between the wheels, or by a tether staked to the center of a circular course, most of these cars use small internal combustion glow plug engines and are known as tether cars.

Electrically powered slot cars which draw power from the track. They became extremely popular in the 1960s, but commercial slot car racing experienced a rapid decline in popularity late in the decade. By the end of the 1970s, the slot car hobby had diminished significantly, especially public tracks operating larger scale cars, and modeling in general was on the decline (HO Slot Car Racing 1999–2011). One website attributes the weakening of the pastime to both the ageing of the baby-boomers along with the fragile economics of the slot car industry and the closing of many commercial slot car tracks perhaps as toy companies offered smaller sets to be used at home. A wide variety of electrically powered vehicles, however are available today – in various forms.

Battery powered model cars are also available. They exist in versions with or without remote control and are common toys.

Spring-powered or "clockwork" car models, that are wound with a key or by a friction mechanism. These were common until slot cars largely replaced them in the 1960s. In fact, the first commercially successful slot cars, the Scalextric 1/32 line (originally 1:30) which debuted in 1957, were simply motorized versions of the earlier Scalex clockwork racers.

Radio-controlled car drifting competition in Bienal do Automóvel exhibition, in Belo Horizonte, Brazil.

Radio-controlled cars, which can be bought assembled or built from kits. These are usually powered by electric motors or glow plug engines. Drivers can control the speed and steering of these cars remotely by a radio signal.

Combustion engine powered model cars are expensive and usually remote controllable. As combustion engines have a significant danger such cars are not suitable for children. Combustion engine powered model cars are often used for races.

== See also ==
- Model building
- Die-cast toy
- Diecast Collector (magazine)
- List of model car brands
