= Muky =

Argentine brand of model cars

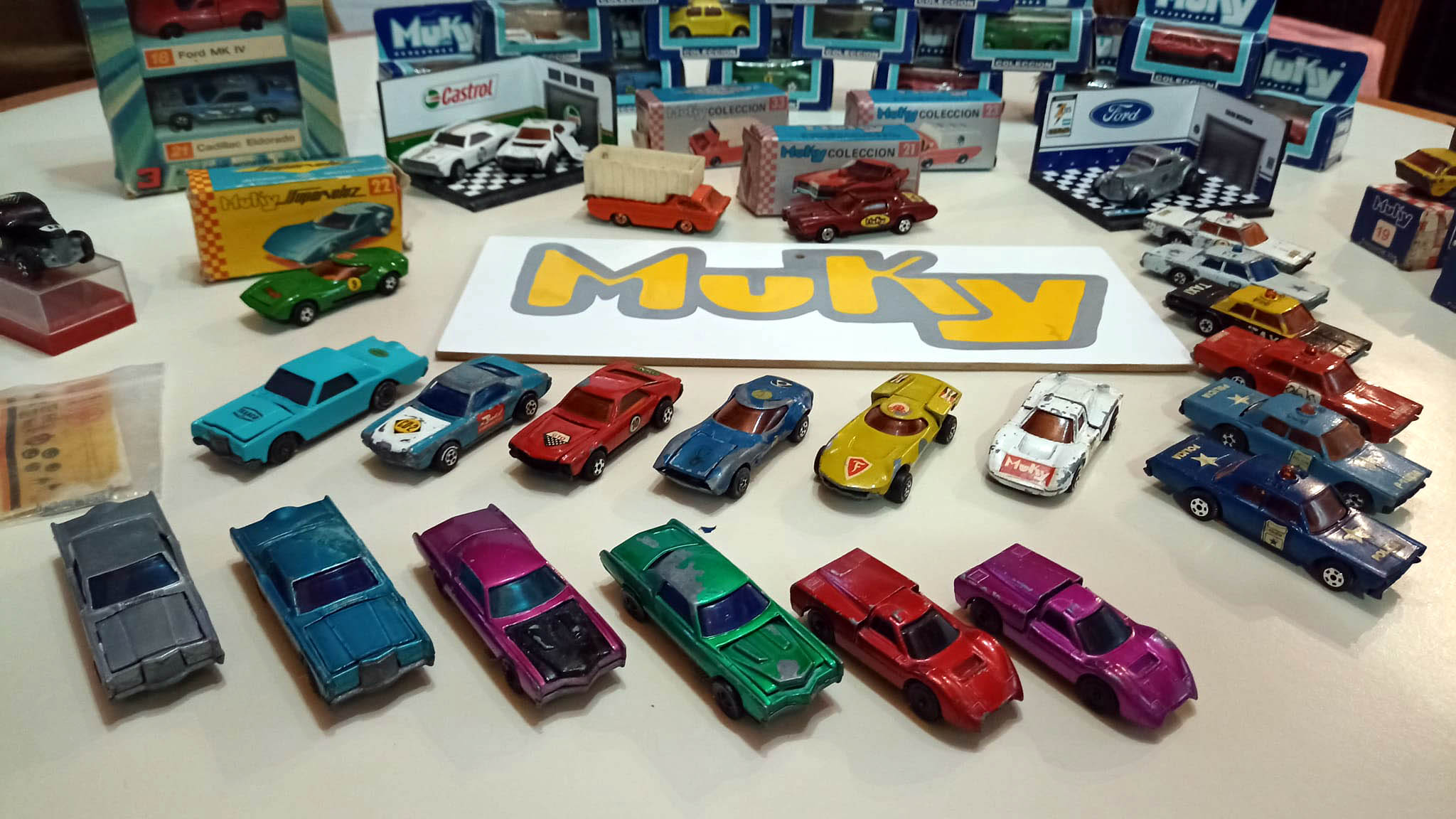
- Several Muky models and boxes
- Product type: Scale model cars
- Produced by: Induguay S.A.
- Country: Argentina
- Introduced: c. 1974
- Discontinued: 1991; 35 years ago
- Markets: Argentina, Brazil, Uruguay

Muky was an Argentine brand of die-cast toy model cars. The brand was popular in Argentina between the 1970s and the 1980s. Most were diecast seconds or knockoffs of early Mattel Hot Wheels.

At its peak, the factory produced 50,000 to 60,000 models by month until 1991, when the factory closed due to competition from imported products.

== History ==
=== Beginning ===
"Muky" was a brand created by ESDECO, a company founded by Mr. Escobar and Libio DeConti and his brother The company's name is an acronym from both families surnames. in the city of Gualeguay, in Entre Ríos Province, 145 miles north-west of Buenos Aires.

Virtually all of the models made by Muky were copies of early Mattel's Hot Wheels like the Custom Corvette, the Lola T70, the Custom Eldorado, or the Dodge Deora. Thus the company is often called the "Hot Wheels of Argentina". Muky were not as popular, or as collectible today, as the country's Buby toys, which made Argentine Torinos, Falcons, and other vehicles that may have been more familiar to children there.

=== Change of management ===
In the late 1970s, because of the worsening economic environment in Argentina, the DeConti brothers moved to Brazil and began manufacturing toys there called "Superveloz". In 1984 or 1985, a certain Dell Arciprete (whose family ran a fumigation business) bought the factory and rights to the Muky brand, changing its name to "Induguay S.A.". Using most of the same dies, the company again began making toy cars. Arciprete's Muky line added a few new vehicles. The Archiprete family ran the factory and the fumigation business at the same time.

The later Mukys were numbered from eight to forty, numbers one through six having been lost along the line somewhere. Also, these later models' chassis were cast in plastic, and Mukys were distributed also to Uruguay and Spain.

== Questions on tooling ==
How Induguay came to possess the Mattel dies is uncertain; one story is that the DeConti brothers stole the dies from Mattel, but two other prevalent theories exist, both logical. One is that the models were carefully copied from blueprints. Another is that third party agents, with the approval of Mattel, sold some dies to the De Contis. In any event, perusal of catalogs of old and new models shows that few of the 37 models originally manufactured by Induguay were ever reissued by Mattel. Apparently, the Arciprete family has kept the tooling and doesn't deny that they might again someday make more Mukys.

== Notes ==
The copies of Hot Wheels vehicles often have the wrong bases with a different vehicle stamped on them, such as the Custom AMX says Chevelle SS as does the box it came in. This list of models below does not reflect the actual models.

== Products ==
List of Muky diecast cars, by number:

- 7 - 1941 Ford
- 8 - Lola GT Spoiler
- 9 - Ford MKN Turbo
- 10 - Ford GT40
- 11 - Chevelle SS
- 12 - Lincoln Continental
- 13 - Arenero Muky
- 14 - Lola GT 40
- 15 - Dodge Charger
- 16 - Corvette Special
- 17 - Motorhome
- 18 - Ford MK IV
- 19a - Transporter Van
- 19b - Mc Laren MCA Turbo
- 20 - Ford GT 40
- 21 - Cadillac Eldorado
- 22 - Lamborghini
- 23 - Tank truck
- 24 - Police car
- 25 - Cattle truck
- 26 - Super Turbo
- 27 - Furgón (truck)
- 28 - Chaparral 2 G
- 29 - Skoda Baby
- 30 - Ford Coupé 36
- 31 - Volcador (truck)
- 32 - Lancia 3000
- 33 - Rapit Urbano (truck)
- 34 - Mc Laren MGA
- 35 - Firetruck
- 36 - Servicio Médico
- 37 - Taxi
- 38 - Volkswagen
- 39 - Ferrari 308
