= 1:43 scale =

Size of die-cast model cars

1:43 scale is a popular size of die-cast model cars in Europe, Asia and the US. It has its origins in the British / European O scale for model trains and the rise of certain accessories made for that scale which since have become popular in their own right. Models in this scale are 10–13 cm length (3.93–5.11 inches).

== Variations in the scale ==
There are many manufacturers in 1:43 scale producing everything from customized and accurate race cars to emergency vehicles, family sedans and SUVs. Trucks and tractor trailers can also be found in this scale, but they are comparatively larger and 1:50 or 1:64 scales are more common for these types of vehicles.

Related train scales are 1:42, 1:48 (American O scale), and also 1:45 scale (NEM European 0 scale), which is only slightly larger than 1:50 scale. Items in all these scales are similar enough in size that they are commonly used together in O layouts.

== European history ==
A 1:43 scale East German Barkas Volkspolizei van by IST. The model is made in Shenzhen, China

The first model car made exactly to 1:43 scale seems to be French Dinky Toys No. 24R Peugeot 203, released in 1951, but many diecast iron or plaster toys in the 1920s and 1930s were also made about the same size, though not as precision 'blueprint' reproductions. As a representative example, a Volkswagen Beetle in 1:43 scale measures about 3.5 inches (90 millimeters) in length. Larger cars might measure 4 to 4.5 inches (100 to 115 millimeters) if reproduced to 1:43 scale.

Countries to first produce this scale were mainly France and the United Kingdom, but Germany and Italy were also homes for the common producers. From the 1950s through the 1980s, 1:43 was primarily used in European toy offerings such as Corgi Toys, Dinky Toys, Schuco, Tekno, Solido, Mercury, Polistil, and Mebetoys.

Metosul of Portugal in the mid-1960s was one of the first diecast toy companies to use tooling (or at least precisely similar designs) from a larger, more well-known company – Dinky in this case. This was the beginning of a trend that would spread across southern Europe to other manufacturers like Spanish Pilen (dies from many manufacturers) or the less successful Turkish Meboto Otomobil (tooling from Italian Ediltoys). Some traditional tooling was also shipped to Mexico (Politoys), Brazil (Solido), or Argentina (Mattel Hot Wheels) by the late 1970s. Venezuelan Juguinsa even used third tier dies with Spanish Pilen borrowings (French Dinky and others had created them previously).

Later, many other manufacturers ranging from Portugal all the way through the former Soviet Union also entered the 1:43 market. Minichamps from Germany and Trofeu and Vitesse from Portugal began to produce 1:43 diecast from the early 1990s, along with several other brands, shortly before most diecast production moved to China and other countries of Southeast Asia.

1:43 scale electric slot cars are also on the market, though these are a relatively recent development compared with the established slot car scales of 1:24, 1:32, and traditional HO or 'Matchbox' sizes (1:87 and 1:64). 1:43 scale has little organized racing competition of the kind that is common in the larger scales, and currently 1:43 is largely used for toy or starter sets.

== Collectibles ==
This scale is still popular, with many models now being made in China, but as time has passed, many new scales for diecast cars, both smaller (1:87, 1:64, and somewhere around 1:55), and larger (1:24, 1:18, and 1:12) have also competed, often more successfully in the toy and diecast market.

Originally meant as toys and accessories for rail layouts, more specialized and expensive limited edition hand-built collectibles made in white metal or resin produced in more limited numbers have become available. This has occurred as more and more adults have entered the collector market, starting perhaps in the late 1970s, but coming on strong since, say, 1990. Such companies are Brooklin Models, Western Models, or Conquest / Madison, but many brands are available, usually manufactured in lower quantities in white metal. Some collectible diecast companies have also appeared that usually make their models in greater quantities in China, like Trax Models or Spark. For examples of such collectible editions and companies, see any of Randall Olson's books on GM or Ford products in miniature.
