= Western Models =

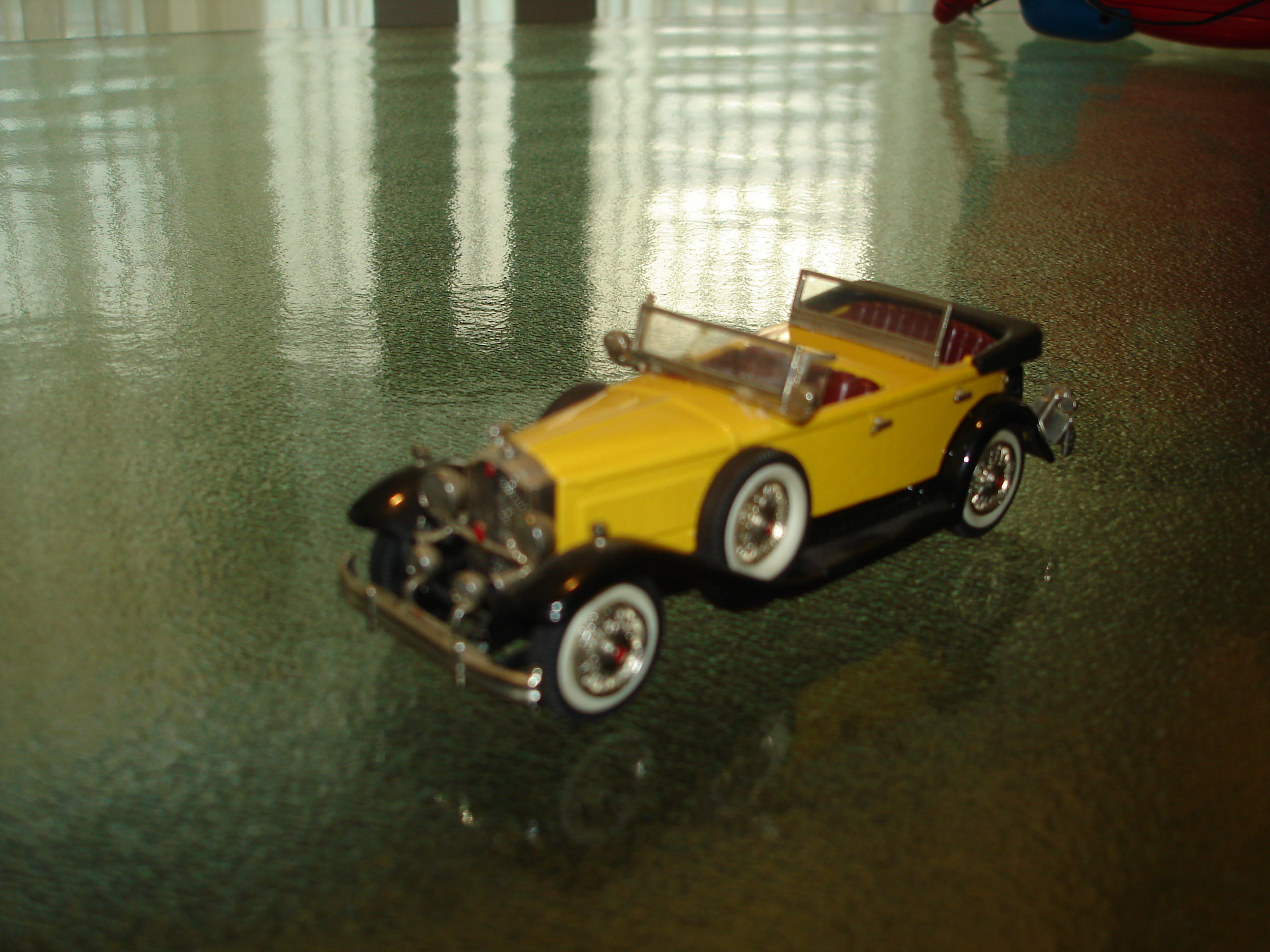
Collector's model of a 1932 Packard Twelve Dietrich Dual Cowl Phaeton, scale 1/43

Western Models Limited was a company making detailed white metal or pewter model vehicles, mostly cars in 1:43 scale. They were made in Taunton, Somerset, in southwestern England. Models were either in kit or built form. The company ceased production of cars about 2007 to focus solely on contemporary aircraft models.

== History ==
=== A first in white metal ===
Western Models Limited was one of the first companies anywhere to produce high-quality hand built models for collectors, usually in lead based white metal. 'Small Wheels' was a line name also used by Western Models, after purchasing a rival company of that name. Models were introduced annually but production runs were often limited, so collectability was insured. By about the year 2000, more than 70 different models had been made, with a new line of aircraft as well.

Western Models was started by entrepreneur Mike Stephens in 1973 with help from his wife, Joyce. Stephens conceived of the company in Devon, but then started production in his garage in Epsom, Surrey, southeast of London. Later, production was moved to larger premises in Redhill, Surrey, then later to a small factory in Taunton, then to Acre Ridge near Taunton, which Stephens claimed was a return to his home in "western" roots. The company, which had about 38 staff in the mid-1980s dropped down to only about 5 by 2005 because of increased competition from China.

=== Manufacturer for Danhausen ===
Western Models was often commissioned to produce vehicles for Danhausen (see Minichamps) and other companies like Motor City USA, Design Studio, Kim Classics, TFC, and EWA Miniatures of New Jersey.

Models could be purchased either assembled and fully finished or in kit form. Other limited edition brands were appearing in the 1970s, however Western Models gained a reputation for exceptional detail, quality parts and ease of assembly.

The first Western Models vehicle was a Mercedes Benz 540K made for Danhausen in November 1973. Soon after, the second model was a 1937 Lagonda 4.5 litre-J.G. 45 Rapide. These early models showed small batch collector car lines had a way to go to get to today's level of Western Models and Brooklin fidelity, et al, although they were welcomed by classic car enthusiasts who had generally meager offerings of models from before World War II.

Danhausen attempted purchase of Western Models, but Stephens did not sell and Danhausen purchased AMR Models instead. Through the 1980s and 1990s, hand built white metal Western Models (similar to Brooklin Models) gained a reputation for high quality and precision detailing and casting, where models are produced in the hundreds or a few thousand - and not mass-produced in the hundreds of thousands or millions.

=== Small Wheels ===
Small Wheels was started by Dave Evans and Sue Pinnington around 1983. They commissioned Paul Willet to make a 1/24 model of the Jaguar Mk2. Paul happened to live in Taunton and so it was convenient to have the parts made by Western Models. A friendship with Mike and Joyce was established. The company made a number of 1/24th scales models including the XJ6/12 and XK150. At this point the models were only sold completely assembled and painted, dials, lights etc. were hand painted. Personal details such as individual number plates and car colours were the unique selling point of these models. Around 1986, western Models bought out the company and went on to produce 1/43 scale models the first of which was the XJ13.

== Models produced ==
On many boxes the phrase "1:43 scale metal model cars for the collector and enthusiast" was printed - the "A" being a pair of engineer's calipers. In the 1980s the box design was changed to mainly black. The company specialized in 1:43 and 1:24, but did special models in a variety of sizes.

American cars of the 1950s (particularly Fords, Plymouths and Buicks in four door and station wagon styles), classic race cars, vintage sports and Grand Prix cars, and land speed record cars were the main types of vehicles represented. Detail was exquisite down to precise numbering from the real race cars and model specific wheel selection and detail. For example, as seen in period photographs, Carroll Shelby's Le Mans-winning 1959 Aston Martin was accurate even in the wheel well covers and in the asymmetrical segmented pieces of the front grille. Jaguar also seemed to be a favorite marque of Western Models, with over 30 different models produced over the years. Another company preference was for Land Speed Record vehicles, and more than 8 different LSR cars were produced.

Though some boxes were black or red, packaging was usually recognizable by the white boxes with "WM" lettering in red and black which covered half of each box.

The 'Small Wheels' series were more likely to be European marques and were made later, through 2000. Also unique were Small Wheels kits in 1:24 scale.

== Today ==
In July 2007, after 34 years of model production, Mike and Joyce Stephens retired. The Western Models name and logo were sold. The company then ceased production of cars to focus solely on its line of modern commercial aircraft, mostly in 1:200 scale. At least thirty-one different aeroplanes have been produced in a wide variety of airline liveries. According to the Western Models website, the company has now apparently moved to Ramat Habalagan, Israel.

Still, the venerable Western Models name did not ceased for the production of collectible miniature automobiles. By 2008, respected SMTS started a line called Western Models Collector's Editions. Models are made at the SMTS Hastings, England shop and have included 1950s American Cars and older European Grand Prix racers. Selections manufactured have been a 1957 Plymouth convertible, a 1958 Plymouth Belvedere hardtop, a 1957 DeSoto Firesweep hardtop, and a 1959 Edsel Corsair four door. Grand Prix models have been an Alfa Romeo 158 and a Talbot Lago T26.
