= Buby toys =

Argentine scale model cars manufacturer

Miniaturas Buby
- Company type: Private
- Industry: Toy; Collecting
- Founded: 1956 in Ranelagh
- Founder: Haroldo Mahler
- Defunct: 1995; 30 years ago
- Headquarters: Ranelagh, Argentina
- Products: Scale model automobiles
- Brands: Buby
- Owner: Haroldo Mahler
- Number of employees: 250

Miniaturas Buby was an Argentine company that manufactured die-cast scale model automobiles and trucks. The company, created by Harold Mahler, was notable for having produced scale model replicas of most of the vehicles manufactured in the country during four decades, such as Fiat 600, Renault 12, Ford Falcon, Citroen 3cv, Renault Fuego, Peugeot 504, among many others.

At its peak, the company produced 1,000 vehicles per day.

== History ==
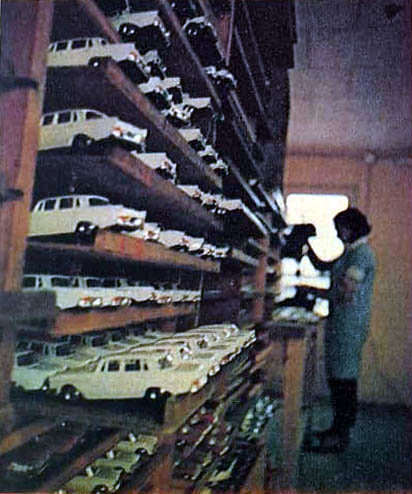
Piles of Buby cars at the Ranelagh factory

The company was founded by naval engineer Haroldo Buby Mahler, starting production at his own house in the city of Ranelagh of Greater Buenos Aires in 1956. At the beginning, Mahler (who was a collector of Dinky cars, imported from Europe by then) produced 200 models which he offered with no success until a manager of a toy store bought him 144 cars, a part of giving him a list of potential clients.

The first models were assembled with parts produced by other companies, but Buby soon controlled the total of the production process. By 1964, Buby produced 210,000 models per year, using 2 tons of zamak per month.

In 1968, the company launched the "Mini Buby" series (1:64 scale). The business, named "Miniaturas Buby" was notable for its replica scale models of some of the most renowned automotive brands, commercialised under license of their respective Argentine subsidiaries. At its peak, Buby produced near 1,000 models per day.

As the Mahler's residence could not fulfil the increasing demand for the model cars, the company established a manufacturing plant in Villa General Belgrano in Córdoba Province, where most of the production process was carried out. The 1:43 scale vehicles were sent to Ranelagh, where they were finished and packaged. The Ranelagh plant also assembled some model cars imported from France, after an agreement with Solido, another model manufacturer. Nevertheless, the successive economical crisis in Argentina caused Buby closed its plants in late 1970s.

In 1982, Mahler revived the Buby brand opening a plant in Don Torcuato, a city located 40 km from Buenos Aires. More than 400,000 models were produced there until 1995, when the company closed definitely. Since 1988, most of the models produced were exported.

== Models ==
For over three decades, Miniaturas Buby produced replicas of most of the real life cars produced in Argentina. The following is a list of those products. Note: Products are listed in alphabetical order

=== 1:43 scale ===
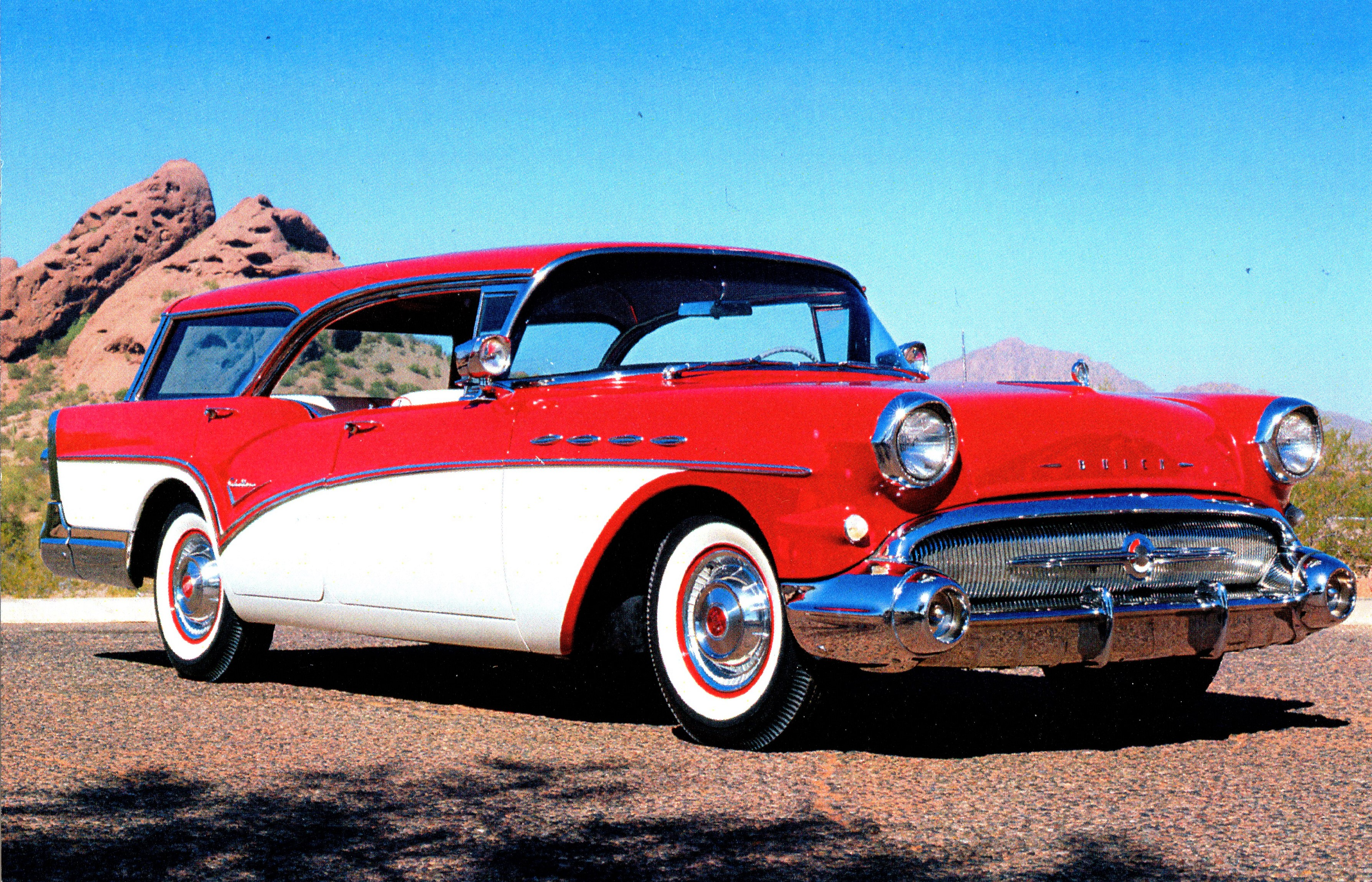
The 1957 Buick Century Caballero was the first model produced by Buby.

- Buick Century Caballero 1957 (Note: It was the first model produced by Buby.)
- Chevrolet Bel Air
- Chevrolet Camaro
- Chevrolet Impala
- Fiat 125
- Ford Fairlane 1958
- Jeep Gladiator
- Mercedes-Benz 300
- Mercedes-Benz LO 1114 truck
- Pontiac GTO 1965
- Porsche Carrera
- Renault Dauphine
- Renault 6
- Renault 19
- Volkswagen Beetle
- Willys Jeep Station Wagon (Note: Commercialised as "IKA Estanciera".)

=== 1:64 scale ===
(Known as the "Mini Buby" series):

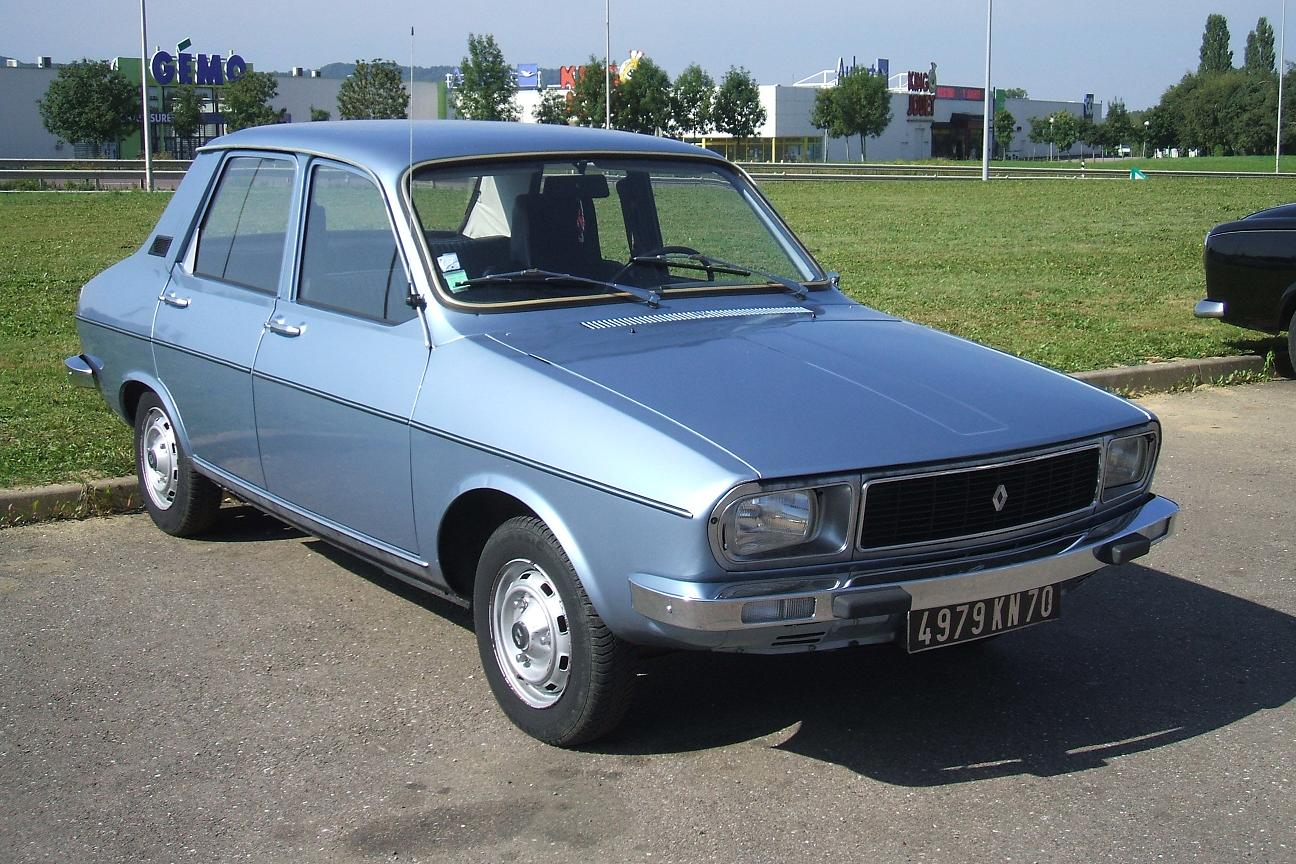
The Renault 12 was one of models of the "Mini Buby" series.

- Citroën 3CV
- Citroën Ami
- Chevrolet Corvette
- Chrysler Valiant I
- De Tomaso Pantera
- Fiat 600
- Fiat 697 truck
- Ford Van
- Ford Mustang
- Maserati Bora
- Maserati Indy
- McLaren Ford
- Mercedes Benz 1114 truck
- NSU Bertone
- Peugeot 404
- Renault 12
- Renault 18
- Renault Trafic
- Volkswagen Gacel

=== Both scales ===
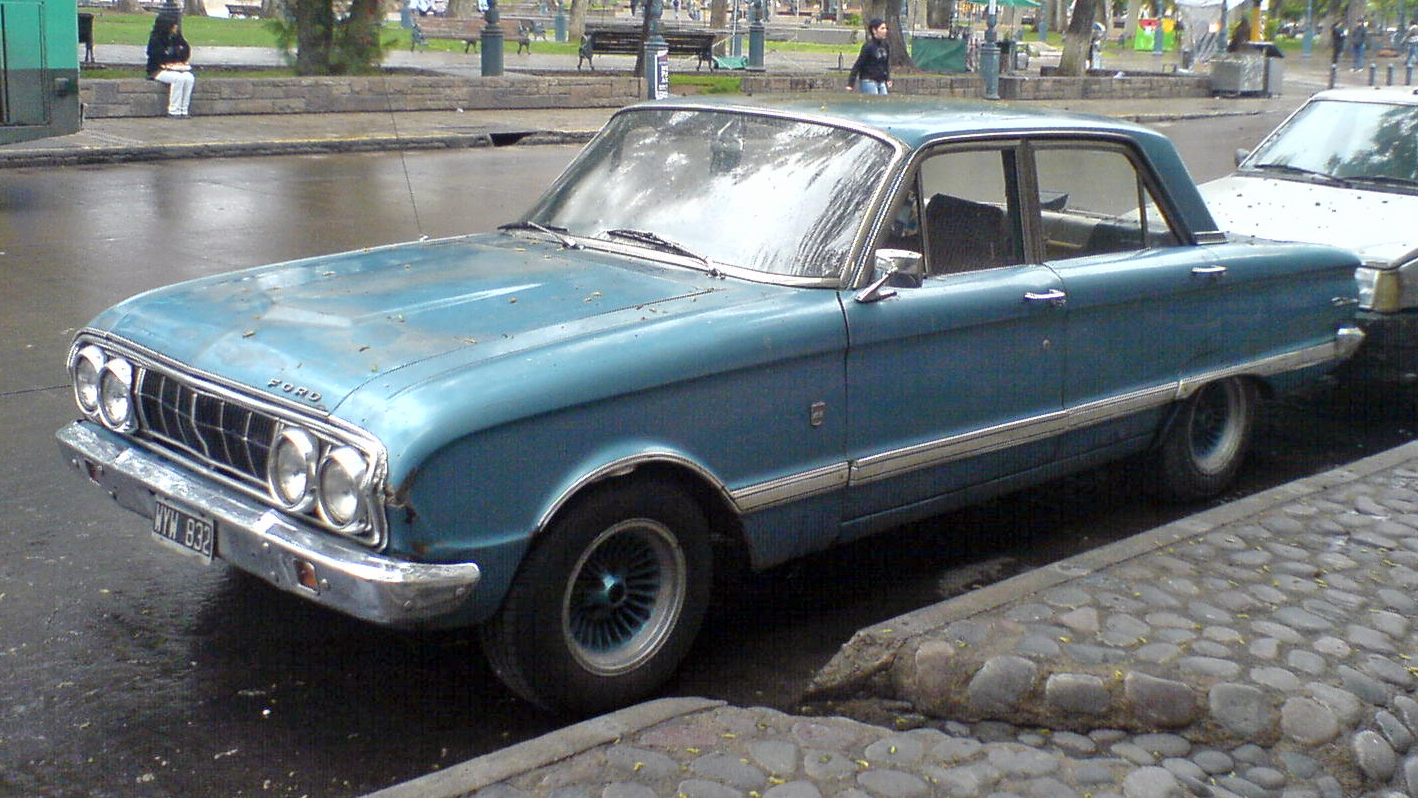
The Argentine version of the Ford Falcon was one of the few models produced in both scales.

- Chevrolet Nova (Note: Sold as Chevrolet "Chevy", the name for which the model was commercialised in Argentina.)
- Fiat 1500
- Fiat 128
- Ford Falcon
- Ford F-100
- IKA Torino
- Peugeot 504

=== Other vehicles ===
- Fiat tractor
- Tank "Centurión"
- Train
- Petrol station

== Legacy ==
Buby is regarded as one of the most emblematic model car manufacturers of Argentina and a pioneer in the industry of die-cast toys.

The exhibition "Buby, un sueño sobre ruedas" (Buby, a dream on wheels) was held in the Golf Museum of Berazategui from July to August 2015. It was declared of Legislative Interest by the Chamber of Deputies of Buenos Aires Province. The exhibition was attended by Mahler himself.

In those years everything was easy, we were all young and impertinently optimistic, there were no difficulties, what you didn't know you learned. We wanted to do things as best as possible. We never imagined that it would transcend and yet today what we started 40 or 50 years ago, half a century ago, is in force.

— Mahler in 2015

In 2022, Buby models were part of an exhibition that paid tribute to several companies or products that made significative contributions to the toy industry in the country.
