= Minichamp =

Minichamp may refer to:

- Minichamps
- a small Victorinox knife model
