= Sergio Goldvarg =

Argentine architect and model car collector

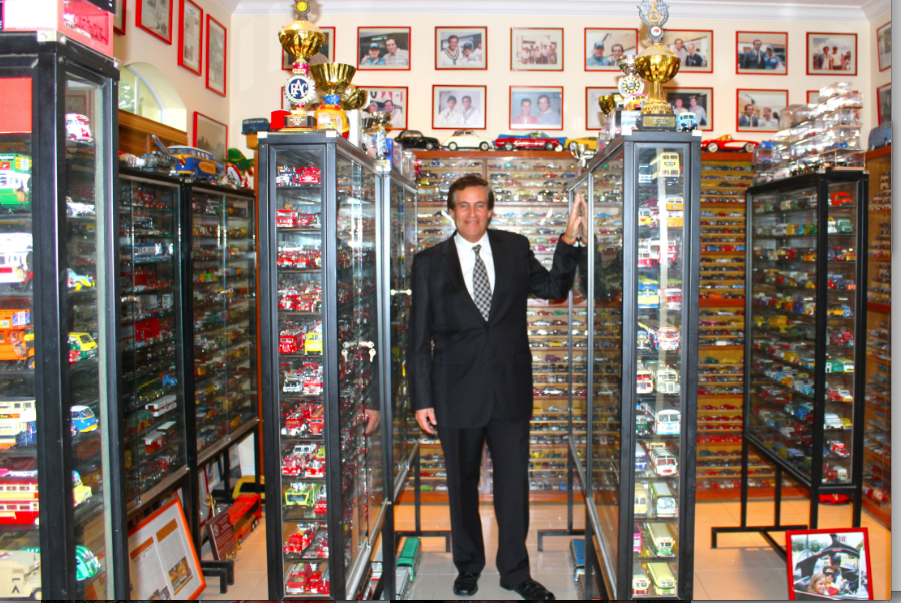

Sergio Goldvarg (born 1957) is an Argentinian architect, better known as a car collector, model car collector and model car maker resident in Miami, Florida.

His large scale model car collection, with 7,000 model cars in 2003 and 12,000 model cars in 2009, was recognized by Guinness World Records. He and his wife Mariana also produced their own line of model American cars. In 2014, Sergio Goldvarg was inducted to the Model Car Hall of Fame in Las Vegas, for preserving the Legacy, for honoring pioneers of the model vehicle industry for their efforts to promote and enhance the hobby. From designers to entrepreneurs. www.modelcarhall.com. In 2018, Goldvarg Collection, the scale model car brand created by Sergio Goldvarg, was inducted to the Modelcar Hall of Fame for the New Brand of the Year. www.modelcarhall.com
