= Doepke Toys =

American Toy Company

- Founded: Charles W. Doepke brother Frederick Doepke
- Founder: 1947
- Defunct: 1960
- Headquarters: United States
- Products: Toys

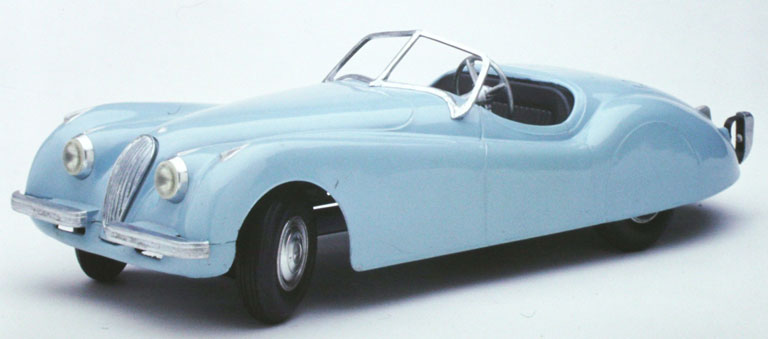
A Doepke Toys Jaguar toy car from 1955. In the collection of The Children's Museum of Indianapolis

Doepke Model Toys are a series of model toys produced by the Doepke Toy Company, based near Cincinnati, Ohio, USA. Doepke made several different types of toys including model automobiles such as the MG, 1955 Jaguar, a fire engine, trains and construction vehicles including bulldozers, graders, loaders, earth movers and cranes.

== History ==
In 1946, Charles W. Doepke and his assistant and brother Frederick, both of whom had previously worked in the steel industry, started the Doepke Toy Company in Oakley, Ohio, a neighborhood of Cincinnati. In 1950, production was moved to Rossmoyne, Ohio. Following soon after the conclusion of World War II, many toys available at the time reflected a war theme. By contrast, the Doepkes were encouraged by their grandmother to create toys that were not war-related and, as a result, they began creating exact duplicates of modern construction equipment and cars.

In the 1950s, Doepke toys became popular with both children and adults. One of the best-selling items was the steel crane, first manufactured in 1949, which was resilient enough for outdoor use and had realistic details like Goodyear rubber tires. The toy had two functional hand crank hoists, accurate rigging, a stamped steel open lattice boom and a working clamshell bucket used for excavating, and was priced at $14.95.

In 1959, due to an increase in lower-cost competitors and a rise in steel costs, coupled with the company's inability to create the same realism with wood toys, Doepke was forced to shut down.

Today, there are many collectors of Doepke toys and they are often sold on online forums.
