= Trofeu =

Trofeu is a line of 1/43 scale diecast vehicles made by Replicar in Portugal. The company was started in 1989, in Espinho just south of Oporto - the same town where Metosul and Luso Toys had previously been made in the 1960s and 1970s. Trofeu products are mainly contemporary rally cars alongside their stock counterparts.

== Product history ==
The first model was a 1987 Ford Sierra Cosworth RAC Rally, which had been driven by Stig Blomqvist. It was released in March 1989. In 1990, the second model was introduced, a Toyota Celica GT4 ST165. Trofeu also manufactured the newer Toyota Celica GT-Four ST185 and ST205 in both rally and stock guises.

Trofeu miniature cars were made of diecast metal mounted on plastic chassis. Most cost about 40 Euros.

As is common with diecast makers today, one rally model would commonly be made in multiple liveries to save on tooling costs. For example, the mid-1970s European Ford Escort RS2000 appeared in Trofeu's line-up in more than 30 different variations, produced up through at least 2004.

== Besides rally ==
Though rally cars were standard fare, Le Mans and prototype racing models often appeared such as the Porsche LMP and 936. The occasional taxi and police car also were produced. One odd model, considering the normal fare, was a Scandinavian Volvo Duett panel van.

== Numbering and packaging ==
Early Trofeu models were numbered with 0 prefix such as 010-015 for Ford Sierra, 016-030 for Toyota Celica ST165 and 031-042 for the Mitusbishi Galant. The first Celica ST185 came with a 044 reference number, but later the whole Celica ST185 line was renumbered with four prefix numbers from 444 to 459. The next models also came with new reference numbers such as 7## for the Celica ST205.

Models were usually packaged in clear plastic display cases sometimes highlighted with folded card decor.

== List of models ==
List of 1/43 scale cars by Trofeu:

- Ford Sierra Cosworth
- Toyota Celica GT4 ST165
- Mitsubishi Galant VR4
- Toyota Celica Turbo 4WD ST185
- Ford Escort RS Mk 1
- Subaru Impreza 555
- Toyota Celica GT-Four ST205
- Renault Alpine A110
- Subaru Impreza WRX STi 22B
- Ford Escort RS 1800 Mk 2
- Ford Cortina
- Ford Capri
- Lancia Delta
- Fiat 131 Abarth
- Saab 96
- Triumph TR7
- Audi Quattro
- Opel Kadett
- Porsche 936
- Porsche LMP prototype racer
- BMW 2002
- Volvo 445 Duett
- Maserati presentation car
- Vauxhall Chevette

== Sources ==
=== Works cited ===
- Stewart, Sean. 2004. Small Ford Scale Models. Webstring selection. ClassicFord.org
- 1994 Trofeu Catalog, Portugal
- 1997 Trofeu Catalog, Portugal
