= Jeep Gladiator =

The Jeep Gladiator may refer to:

- Jeep Gladiator (SJ), a pickup truck made by Jeep from 1962 to 1988, known as the Jeep J-Series after 1971
- Jeep Gladiator (JT), a pickup truck made by Jeep from 2019 onwards
