= Metosul =

Toy manufacturer

MetOsul was Portugal's oldest diecast toy manufacturer. The original company was founded in the Atlantic coastal town of Espinho a few miles south of Oporto, in 1931. At its high point it was known for making quality castings in the style of Dinky Toys.

== Name and history ==
Originally called Luso-Celluloide, the company made toy jewelry, and other trinkets, focusing on celluloid (plastic) objects. Later, the name Osul was created for the production of plastics - this was an anagram of the Luso name. Zamac toys appeared in the 1960s, thus the name Metal Osul or MetOsul (with a capital 'O') was coined. Metosul made various metal objects besides cars including a large assortment of toy tools. The meat of the Metosul name were its line of 1:43 scale cars and trucks. Metosul lasted until about 1990. Other diecast manufacturers like Vitesse and Trofeu appeared during the European Union years, but, apparently, Metosul was not a company that benefited from EU funding, perhaps because it was not a start-up. Zamac metal and also plastic vehicles, usually in 1:43 scale, also appeared under the Luso Toys name during the 1970s and 1980s.

== Model lines ==
Contrary to what is often said, no MetOsul vehicles were produced from tooling acquired from British or French Dinky Toys. The Atlantean bus is similar to the former Dinky model, though a mirror image so that the driver is on the left. I was produced in many combinations and liveries and although the same size as the Dinky has many small differences. It is notable that Portugal was one of the few European countries that had large fleets of double-decker busses in the 1960's. Most of the cars were produced in 1/43 scale, while the Atlantean bus, and trucks, were made smaller.

Among the best known in about 1:43 scale are the Renault Floride, Alfa Romeo Giulietta Spyder, Caravana Notin, Citroën DS 19, Leyland Atlantean Bus, Mercedes-Benz 1113 truck, Mercedes-Benz 190, Mercedes-Benz 200, Mini Morris Cooper, Peugeot 204, Peugeot 304, Renault R16, Volvo P1800, 1907 Rolls-Royce, Volkswagen Beetle, Volkswagen Combi, and a 1960s style camper trailer. There was also a smaller line in about 1:60 scale - one was a Volkswagen transporter panel van with a sliding side door.

Each car was available in four or five colors and the vehicles had hand painted details, especially the buses. Cars often had different liveries to boost sales. For example, the Mercedes 200 came in Policia, Policia "Comando" (command) car, Fire Chief car, Portuguese taxi, Portuguese 'rental' ("aluguer"), and an Amsterdam taxi. The Mercedes 1113 truck came in SONAP, FINA, Shell, Golp, BSB Porto, and SACOR tankers, box back postal delivery, and canvas covered policia, E.G.T. Community Service, GNR, and military troop carrier variations. The Volvo P1800, oddly, came in a police variant, but, in fact, almost every car came in a police variant, even the sporty Volvo and Renault Floride.

== Marketing ==
Earlier 1960s boxes were cardboard with blue and red sides with illustrations of the vehicles found inside. Box flaps were yellow and the overall design was reminiscent of Dinky or Corgi. A few years later, packages were commonly yellow cardboard with an early use of thin plastic behind oval windows cut from the sides of the boxes. Overall, the packaging still looked Dinky or Corgi, with 'view' windows appearing about the same time as these larger firms.
