= Gamda Koor Sabra =

Israeli diecast toy company

Gamda Koor, also known as Sabra, was an Israeli diecast toy company that specialized in 1:43 scale cars. Most of these seem to have been original offerings, not seen elsewhere and not secondary tooling. The toy company Cragstan marketed Gamda Sabras as "Detroit Sr." for the American Market.

== Company name ==
Gamda was a toy brand name of the parent firm Habonim in Kibbutz Kfar HaNassi (Village of the President) located in Northern Israel, north of the Sea of Galilee and just adjacent to the border to the Golan Heights. The name 'Gamda' means 'midget' or 'dwarf' in Hebrew (thus 'Midget' toys). In the 1967 Six Day War with Syria the factory was damaged and repairs were needed – production soon resumed. Koor was a company name added later (see next section). The latter name 'Sabra' was applied to the mid-1960s diecast line of mostly American cars and was a uniquely nationalistic Israeli concept. This word for cactus signifies an Israeli Jew born anywhere in the historical land of Palestine. It is interesting that the name Sabra was also given to the Israeli real car brand from the mid-1960s. Thus the toy brand Gamda Sabra could be translated as "Israeli-born midget toys".

== History ==
In 1962, the company started recasting old British D.C.M.T. (Lone Star Toys) dies of tractors, trucks and military vehicles. Gamda vehicles were produced in two series – transport (Jeepsters, Daimler, an American Buick, Ford Prefect, a Standard Vanguard delivery truck, buses, milk trucks, petrol tankers, etc.) or military (Jeeps, tanks, trucks, and trailers, etc.). One of the more popularly seen was a wheeled tank / armored car. One early Gamda offering that has become in demand is a bus in the livery of the Egged Ta'avura Cooperative, which was the main transportation agency in Israel. The bus has been known to sell for more than $1,000.

In about 1966, Gamda partnered with another firm, Koor, which was owned by the Histradrut, the Israeli trade union. This formed a company called Gamda Koor Export. The new company mainly existed to introduce a new line of mainly American automobiles aimed at foreign markets. At the time, export taxes had been lowered, helping Israeli businesses to break into international markets. These were called Sabra Super Cars and were mainly unique tooling of vehicles not made by other European model makers. Most Sabras were manufactured between 1969 and 1972, but some perhaps a tad earlier. There were 24 models in the series and they were numbered from 8100 to 8123. Models included a 1965 Plymouth Barracuda, a 1966 Charger, a 1965 Chrysler Imperial convertible (Corgi Toys also offered a convertible Imperial, see comparison below), a 1966 Buick Riviera, a 1965 Corvette Coupe (not split window, but the convertible hardtop), a 1965 Chevrolet Chevelle station wagon, a 1966 Olds Toronado, a 1967 Cadillac Eldorado, a 1967 Cadillac Coupe deVille, a 1967 Pontiac GTO, a 1968 Pontiac Firebird, a 1967 Chevy pickup and tow truck, a 1965 Ford Mustang, a Ford GT, a 1967 Ford Torino, a 1966 Chevrolet Impala coupe, a 1967 Camaro, a 1967 Ford Thunderbird, a Volkswagen Beetle and a Jeep Willys. Models were often available in a stock, police, or taxi livery. Some of these, like the Barracuda, Charger, Torino and GTO are more rare and sought after.

== Israel ==
Unique to an Israeli product, models were often seen with United Nations markings, Israeli Army and Israeli Defense Force markings, the Star of David and Hebrew lettering. Marketing emphasized Israeli desires to be accepted as a mainstream toy producer (if not a world class country) in the international market. Markings on the cars were commonly transfer decals and not stickers. The Chevelle wagon was offered in UN (United Nations), IDF (Israel Defense Force), Israeli Army, Hadassah Medical ambulance, postal, Red Cross ambulance and fire chief liveries while the Impala was seen in several police guises and a couple of different taxi (monit) versions. The Jeep appeared with UN lettering.

Gamda Sabra 1965 Plymouth Barracuda from the rear. Note that the bumper and body do not make a precise union.

The Charger could be had with the United Nations globe and wreath seal on the doors, while the Eldorado and Riviera were available as Israeli Ministerial cars with doors displaying the shield with the menorah. Some of the cars like the Corvair, Camaro and Riviera were even described on packaging as a "tourist bureau car" or "Israeli President Car". Some cars, especially the Beetle, came with 1970s style 'hippie' flower decals, but the Bug also came in a German (surprisingly, not Israeli !) police version.

== Packaging and marketing ==
Early Gamda Koor Sabra cars were marketed in a clear plastic box with a red 'garage door' to one end. The model in the box was secured on a yellow plastic base that incorporated a petrol pump at one end and a flap to hold the garage door closed. Clear boxes of the editions for the international market were backed with a white, red, and yellow card that said "Sabra Super Car" and included a collector coin and detail slip translated into twelve languages. Later cars had a darker blue card, and came with a cut-out puzzle for added play value.

Later, toy maker Cragstan wanted a piece of the diecast market that Corgi and Dinky had captured and enlisted Gamda Koor models for its international (and specifically American) sales. These models also used the garage door box, but often with a patriotic red, white and blue color scheme on the backing card and down the side of the box. Cragstan called its Sabra Super Cars, "Detroit Seniors". The Cragstan and Detroit Senior names were also molded into the plastic chrome bases of these cars. There were few differences between Sabra and Cragstan castings. One could be seen on the Chevelle wagon. The Chevrolet bow tie was shown on the sides behind the front wheel well, but on the Cragstan version it is missing. The Cragstan cars went for $1.49 in the US market, but did not bear the standard Israeli police, army and post symbols.

== Not seen elsewhere ==
The Sabra collection stood out because Gamda Koor produced several cars at a 1:43 scale that no other manufacturer had tried to replicate. The Charger, Barracuda, Corvair, Impala, Cadillac and Riviera do not seem to be second-hand tooling from any other European manufacturer. Considering the uniqueness of the tooling and the Israeli presentation, the Sabra line comes off as fascinating and distinct in the world of miniature diecasts. Though the execution of the cars could have been better, the overall character and raison d'etre of these cars was lost on a famed Christie's auction house book whose authors simply called the Sabra cars "...on the whole, not good" with no other contextual comments.

The Chrysler Imperial convertible, at first glance, appears to be a casting from Corgi Toys (no. 246), but even cursory inspection shows they are quite distinct. The Corgi is smaller and a more customary 1:43 scale while the Gamda is larger, probably about 1:40. Lines and trim are distinct – the Corgi has a crease line on hood and 'boot' missing from the Gamda, but the side profile of the Gamda appears more accurate. The metal of the Gamda body completely surrounds the windshield, while the Corgi is all plastic. Instead of having all features open, as the Corgi does, only the trunk opens on the Gamda, which was strange, but common on Sabra cars.

The Olds Toronado may be similar to the Tekno version, but considering the above, is probably not Tekno tooling. The Charger, Impala, Thunderbird and the Imperial are similar in that all have only trunks that open. The Barracuda, Riviera, Toronado, Corvair, Corvette, and Mustang all have opening doors. The Impala was, intriguingly, made in a two-door and a four-door version – the four-door appeared to just have an additional pillar added with four doors 'etched' (making the fit rather tight) in the metal.

The fidelity of the shapes to the real cars was good, but not excellent. Perhaps the Riviera's and Barracuda's proportions are the best, while the Charger looks a bit stretched. The roof of the Corvette is a bit squarish and the opening doors on the Corvair look rather roundish compared to body panels they are supposed to match. Body lines are not smooth, with sometimes gravelly and uneven edges. Many of these cars have front and rear bumpers that are part of diecast plastic bases. Being such, many times the bumpers do not match up well with the diecast metal bodies, leaving gaps, as with the Barracuda shown above. Wheels were simple and unadorned indented silver metal discs with protruding axle ends. Some later cars had plastic five-spoke 'star' chrome wheels.
