= Minichamps =

German die-cast car producer

Minichamps Paul's Model Art GmbH
- Company type: Privately held
- Industry: Manufacturing
- Founded: May 1, 1990
- Founder: Paul G. Lang
- Headquarters: Aachen, Germany
- Area served: Worldwide
- Key people: Paul G. Lang, Romy Crombach-Lang
- Products: Diecast models
- Number of employees: 45
- Website: minichamps.de

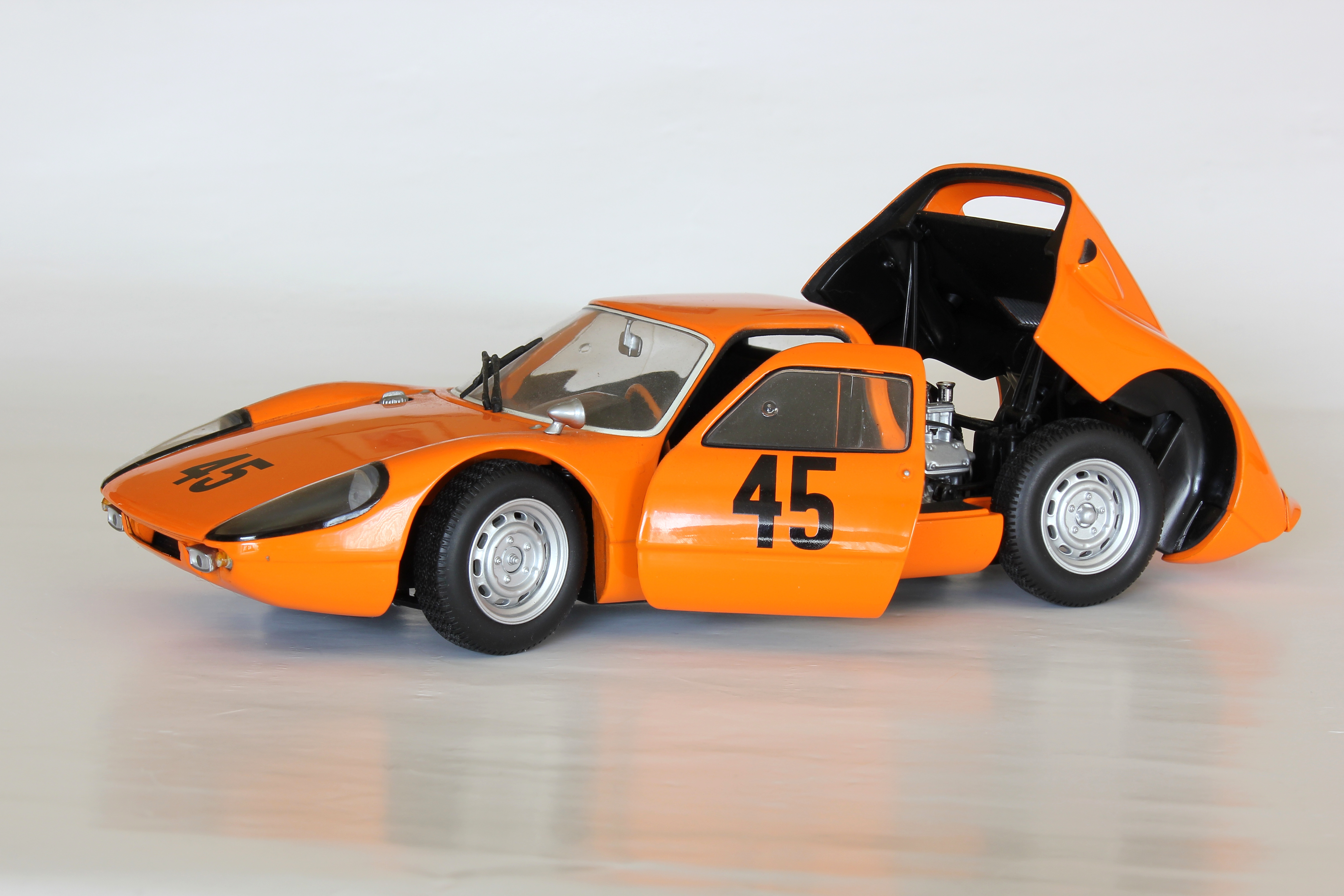
A 1:18 scale model of the Porsche 904 produced by Minichamps

Minichamps is a die-cast model car brand founded as Paul's Model Art GmbH in 1990 in Aachen, Germany, best known for its 1:18, 1:43 and 1:64 scale models. The company grew out of the Danhausen trade catalog of miniature vehicles and specially made Danhausen diecast releases during the 1970s.

== The Danhausen legacy ==
Danhausen was a trade company established in 1921 which sold a variety of products like bicycles and motorscooters. As time passed it focused more on toys and by 1971 the company was owned by the Grandsons of Emma Danhausen, Hans Peter and Paul Gunter Lang. At this time the Lang brothers moved into selling model cars both over-the-counter and by mail order. The brothers distributed many different marques of mainly 1:43 scale models and began to publish the famous Danhausen World Model Car Book annually from 1971 to 1993, which was the last word in available 1:43 scale models worldwide. The last edition of the catalog in 1993 was 350 pages long and listed 15,000 models.

During the mid-1970s, the Langs contracted with several companies, including Tin Wizard, Western Models and AMR (André Marie Ruf) as suppliers of the models they desired. These were almost exclusively made in white metal and the cars provided were given several different names; one was 'SD Modelle', another 'Metal 43', 'Plumbies' and 'Plumbies Inter'. Yet another was to go on to become the permanent name for the company – Minichamps by Danhausen, at first mainly a range of racing cars. Reportedly, the first model offered to Danhausen by Western Models was a Mercedes-Benz 540K. Though using other companies' miniatures, Danhausen became a model name unto itself and as time passed the brothers tried to cement the relationship as Western Models had supplied Danhausen for about a decade. The Langs wanted to buy Western Models, but owner Mike Stephens declined. Eventually they purchased AMR and Danhausen was finally a de facto producer.

During the 1980s, Danhausen moved into HO scale, producing many white metal models in either kit or fully finished form. These models were called 'Metal 87' and included at least 33 different vehicles.

In the late 1980s, the Lang brothers had a dispute at the future direction of the company and Hans Peter departed to start his own hobby shop. From this time on, the Danhausen name was minimized (though a website with the name remained operational, similar to that of Minichamps). Paul Gunter and his wife, Romy, took over the business and formed Paul's Model Art in the late 1990s, which is a name still used alongside the main line of Minichamps. Paul's Model Art started a trend of moving production to China – as labor costs made models too expensive to fabricate in Europe. Generally, diecast models were increasingly made for adult clientele – so the industry was entering a new era when models would not be played with by younger folk, so the question of cars holding their value (that is, with more surviving for longer periods of time) became a central question.

Some of the earliest cars to carry the Minichamps name were made in the late 1970s and were kits. One example was the BMW 320 Turbo with 40 parts. The models required preparations made in advance to be assembled easily.

== Paul's Model Art ==
The first Paul's Model Art diecast car made by Minichamps appeared in 1990; a 1:43 scale model of the Audi V8 driven by Hans-Joachim Stuck which won the 1990 German Touring Car Championship. By 1995 Minichamps was manufacturing more than 110 different castings in several hundred different racing liveries and three different scales – and was also a sponsor of various race teams. The company was officially named Minichamps GmbH in 1996. Minichamps produces die-cast models of Formula One cars and other racing cars, road cars, 1:12 scale motorcycles, trucks, buses, and military vehicles. Cars in 1:43 scale have exceptional detail including items like badges in the center of steering wheels and hubcaps, and separately molded parts for windshield visors, door handles, air vents, headlight lamp lenses, and hood badges. Most of the production is carried out in China.

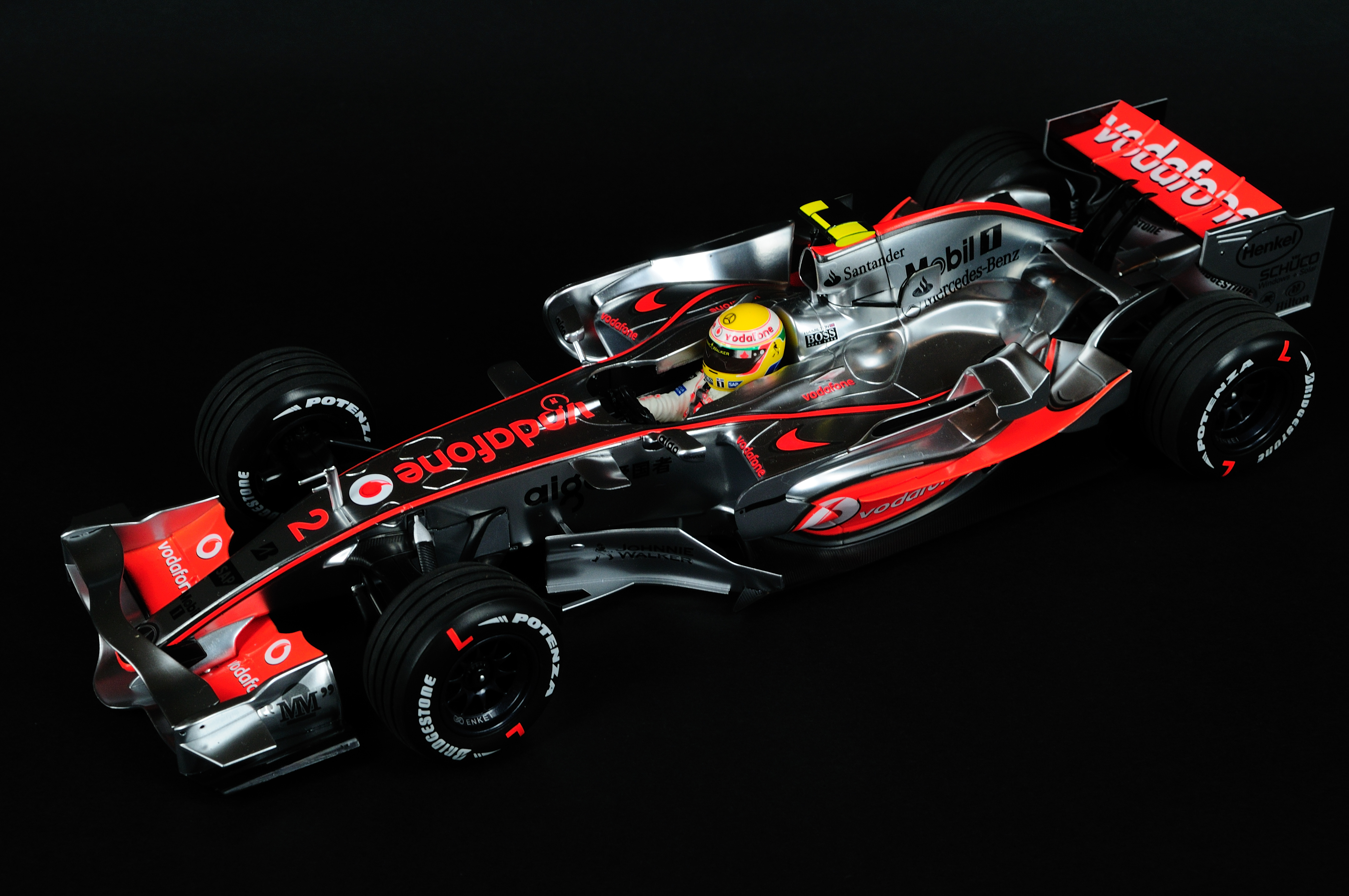
Minichamps 1:18 scale Vodafone McLaren Mercedes MP4-22 Formula One racing car

Several car manufacturers, including Mercedes-Benz, Audi, Porsche, Volkswagen, Opel and BMW, have licensed the company to produce official promotional scale models.

== UT Models and lawsuit ==
During the 1990s, in collaboration with Kelvin Kwan of Unique Toys (UT Models), Hong Kong, a line of 1:18 scale models was introduced. Kwan had apparently pushed for development of most of the selection for the UT series of model cars. A small line of 1:64 models called "MicroChamps" was also introduced in 1994 but discontinued in 1999. It included a series McLaren cars driven by Michael Schumacher. In 2009, a new line of 1:64 models was introduced called "MiniChamps 64".

Related to UT Models, in 2004, a lawsuit in Hong Kong courts was initiated by Paul's Model Art as the plaintiff. UT Models and Gateway Global and Gateway Hong Kong was accused of selling certain models in Germany to which Paul's Model Art claimed to have sole distribution rights. It claimed that UT Models had used Gateway for new offerings to circumvent Paul's Model Art's marketing deal. As of 2013, the lawsuit between Paul's Model Art and AUTOArt's parent company, Gateway Global, is still ongoing.
