= Brooklin Models =

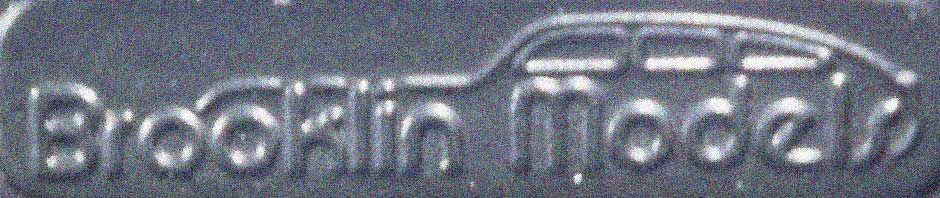
Model chassis detail

Brooklin Models Ltd, since 1974, is the largest producer of handmade white metal 1:43 scale miniature models. Selections are normally vintage American cars and trucks. Brooklin Models is located in Bath, England, and all models are currently produced there. Unlike high-volume, mass-produced models, all of Brooklin's models are hand-built in small quantities, and most of its models are made using white metal.

== History ==
The first home of Brooklin Models was the Canadian town of Brooklin, Ontario, forty miles northeast of Toronto, near Oshawa. This town is the brand's namesake. From the beginning, Brooklin Models specialized in models of cars not generally produced by other manufacturers, including cars produced by smaller 'independent' marques (e.g., Studebaker and Hudson) and 'orphan' marques no longer producing vehicles (e.g., Edsel and DeSoto). The very first Brooklin was the 1933 Pierce Silver Arrow, followed by a Tucker Torpedo, and a Ford Model A. The earliest models were made in resin.

In 1979, John Hall, the founder of Brooklin Models, decided to move his wife Jenny and family back to England where he was born and raised. This is where Brooklin Models continues business to this day. The impact of the move made models previously made in Canada instantly more sought after and valuable. In 1998, after John Hall's retirement, Nigel Parker and Tim Fulford purchased the company.

The Brooklin factory in Bath now covers 5,000 square feet (460 m^{2}) on two floors and employs 21 people.

== Making white metal models ==
Most diecast model vehicles are made of the zinc alloy called zamac (also called 'mazak') but many collectible models are made through a different process rendering white metal. Most diecast cars come from the automated injection of molten metal into machined dies, but white metal models are hand-built and produced in far fewer numbers. As the Brooklin website states, this process works better for producing hundreds of vehicles, not hundreds of thousands, or millions. The average run for a Brooklin Model in the 1990s was about 3,000 pieces, though there are special issues of 1,000 cars or less. A few, however, were produced in higher numbers. Between 7,000 and 10,000 of the 1953 Chevrolet panel sedan delivery, were produced. This model appeared in many different promotional liveries, like Gulf Oil, Sunoco, and Trans-Canada Airlines. Most Brooklin models are produced over a five-year period.

In making a white metal model, a brass master is carefully made by hand out of sheet brass by a skilled model maker which takes hundreds of hours. When the brass master is complete a rubber mold is made for the various parts that will be needed in making the finished model.

A special, very malleable alloy of white metal is used, that is based heavily on tin but contains some lead. Exacting measures are followed. The alloy is brought to a specific temperature, poured into the rubber molds at a specific speed, to set for a specific time. Models are cast one at a time.

After being cast, the parts are carefully removed from the molds. Flashing, the excess metal around the molded figure, is carefully removed and the parts are then prepared for either painting or chrome plating. The windows are vac-u-formed. Tires are made of a special rubber compound and all parts are readied for assembly. The models are assembled by hand and any additional painting such as tail lights or chrome features is done.

== Detail and offerings ==
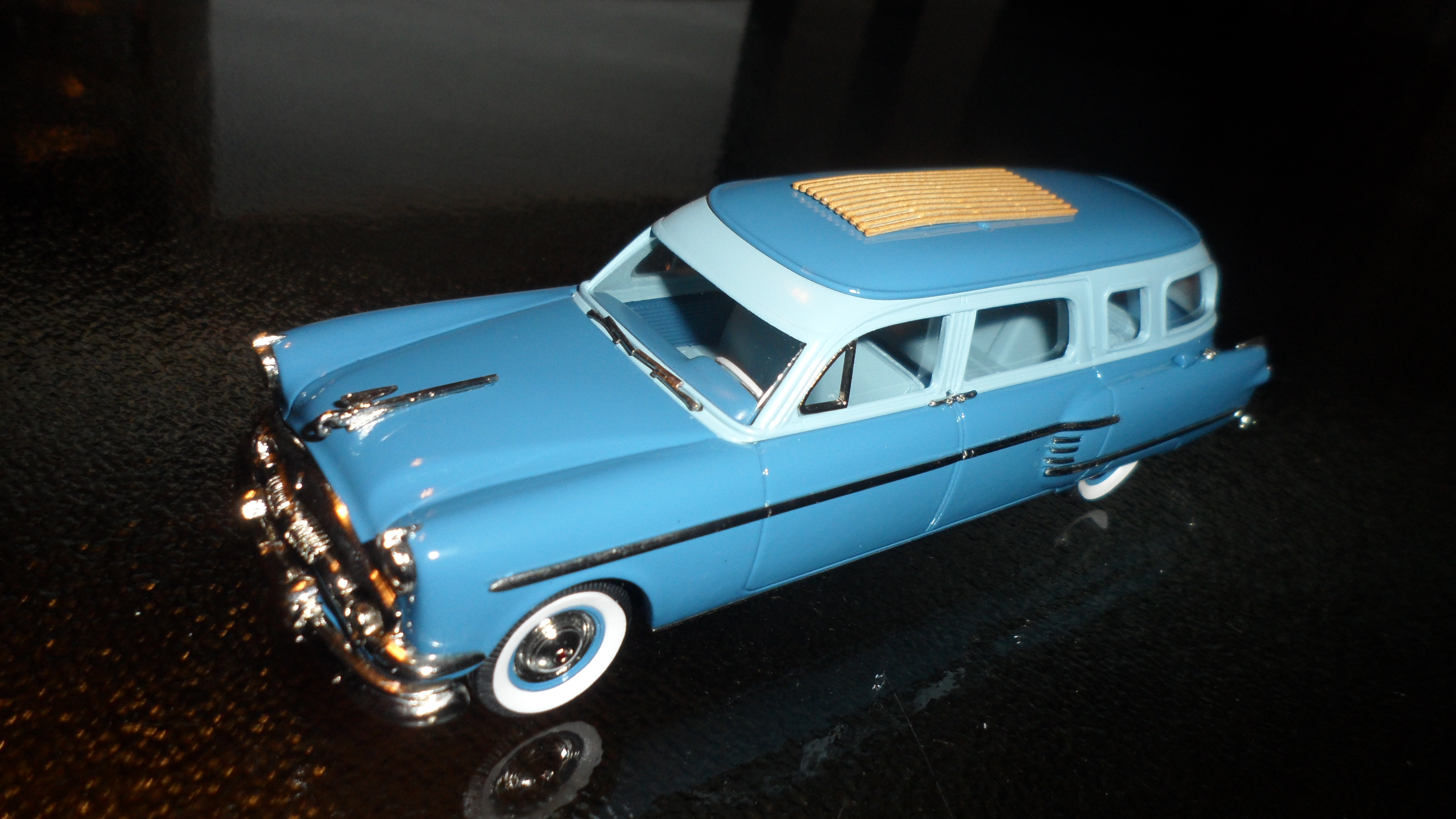
Collector's model of the 1954 Henney-Packard Super Station Wagon, scale 1/43. Brooklin No. brk-190.

Brooklin makes cars, trucks, boats, trailers and a few other special order vehicles and items. The main Brooklin line is almost always American makes. Since most parts are hand cast in white metal, without plastic parts, models are notable for their weight. According to the Brooklin website, John Hall, had been an engineering instructor at the University of Toronto, and left to make white metal models of cars. His first creations were fairly crude, without plastic windows, few details and with white rubber tires. Despite the simplicity, not many companies in the 1970s were producing early American auto models and David Sinclair, one of the earliest importers of scale models to the United States, reported that models were commonly sold to collectors in Germany and Japan.

As time passed, plastic windows were added and many details impressively reproduced, yet there has always been a simplicity of production that is notable. For example, chrome features on real cars are often body color on Brookin Models and some modelers use chrome foil to add realism. Brooklins, however, were always unique because of the models chosen. Though some were the same models seen elsewhere, often those chosen for production were makes or models which had never been reproduced in miniature, such as the 1939 Graham Sharknose, 1941 Hupmobile Skylark, the 1954 Dodge Royal 500, the 1953 Airstream Wanderer RV trailer, and the 1941 Chrysler Newport Phaeton concept that paced the Indianapolis 500. Unlike many models posed for photos, Brooklins often look more impressive in person.

As time has passed Brooklin models have become more sophisticated. When its 1937 Pontiac Deluxe Six model was introduced the sheen of the "Golden Brown Poly" paint of the original car was faithfully reproduced for the model. To enhance profits, Brooklin would also offer many variations on one car, like the 1952 Cadillac Coupe de Ville Series 62 which came in four variations.

In 1996 a promotion was announced where if a collector bought eight Brooklin Models, and completed a collector card, a special limited edition 1946 Lincoln Continental redesigned by Raymond Loewy, could be purchased for the same price as a standard issue.

In 2004, the company celebrated its 30th anniversary with several special edition vehicles. One of the celebration vehicles was the 1936 Pierce-Arrow Silver Arrow.

As of the end of 2006, over 120 different American cars, light trucks and trailers, in over 600 varieties, have been created by Brooklin Models, representing American cars and light trucks of the 1930s through 1960s.

== Ranges developed ==
Starting a trend in developing different lines, Brooklin added the Lansdowne range of British vehicles in 1993. These were seven distinct models designed by John Martin and John Hammick, including such vehicles as the Austin Healey Sprite (John and Jenny Hall's first car), the Vauxhall Cresta, and MG Magnette, thus cars of traditional British marques became important to Brooklin in addition to American cars. Ten more Lansdowne models were introduced by 1996. Sporting as well as saloon models appeared in the Lansdowne range, which was made to reminisce classic 1950s models made by Dinky Toys.

At the same time, the Robeddie line was introduced, consisting of twelve separate replicas of Swedish Volvos and Saabs, from a 1946–1950 Volvo PV60 sedan to a 1973 Volvo 144GL. According to the Brooklin website, as of 2010, this range has been discontinued.

About the turn of the century, several different lines were introduced which mainly represented a breaking of the extensive and complex numbers of vehicles into convenient groupings. These were Brooklin (the traditional American vehicles range), Lansdowne (British vehicles), Robeddie (Swedish vehicles), The Buick Collection (Buicks from 1934–1939), The Pontiac Collection (1937 models), US Model Mint (Pickups, trucks, and trailers from the United States), Community Service Vehicles (Fire, Ambulance, and hearses), International Police Vehicles, and Rod 43rd (selected vehicles customized as Hot Rods – a surprising departure from the regular Brooklin style). Some of the issues for the Community Service Vehicles have been particularly intricate and interesting offerings like the 1960 Miller-Meteor Cadillac "Guardian" ambulance complete with lights, gold trim and overhang style rear door.

== Custom variations ==
Over the course of Brooklin's history, many customizers have emerged who take commissions from Brooklin customers to paint and detail standard Brooklin models into specialized one-of-a-kind renditions. These "Code II" and "Code III" models are treasured by collectors and valued on the marketplace. Prominent Brooklin customizers include John Arnold, John White and John Roberts. Arnold, the son of well-known model builder Bruce Arnold in California, offers his models through eBay and White works exclusively with distributors of 1:43 scale handbuilts. Roberts (2003) is based in England and converts mostly models from Brooklin lines with factory approval. An example of Roberts' creativity are his alterations of the Brooklin 1967 Ford Thunderbird into limosines and hearses.

== Brooklin today ==
Where many revered white models makers like Western Models, Durham Classics and Elegance Models have come and gone, Brooklin, one of earliest in this collector's genre, not only perseveres, but thrives. At the turn of the century, Nigel Parker with the help of talented patternmaker Ian Pickering, has done a remarkable job taking old issues and modeling them into new releases. Examples are a 1939 LaSalle 2 door touring into a 2-door five window coupe, a 1938 Cadillac 60 Special Sedan into a phaeton, and a 1954 Chevrolet 2 door hardtop into a handyman station wagon. As of 2008, Brooklin continued to produce approximately one new model every month – with a total of one thousand models produced.
