= Wooden toy train =

Children's toy

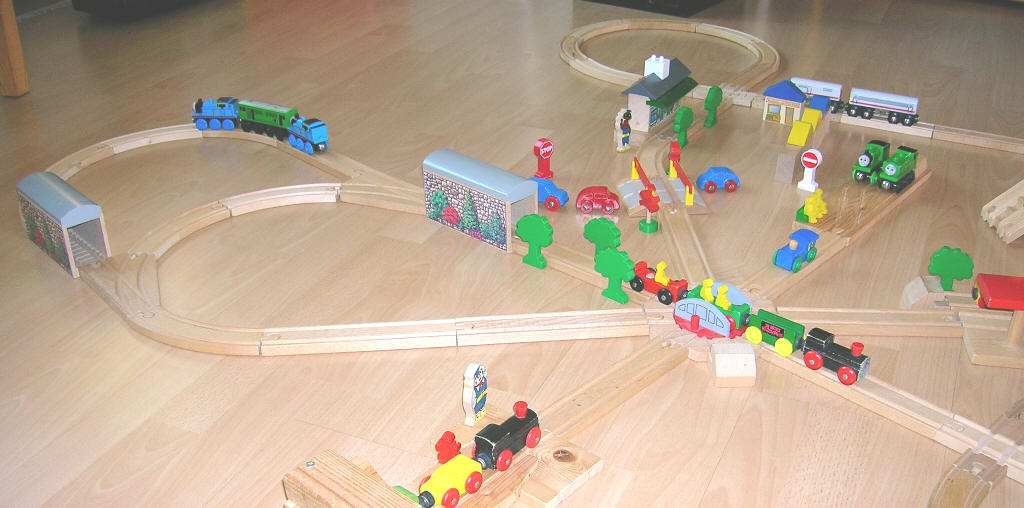
- A Thomas & Friends-themed wooden toy train layout with compatible parts from different brands.
- Type: toy train
- Company: Various
- Materials: wood, metal, magnet

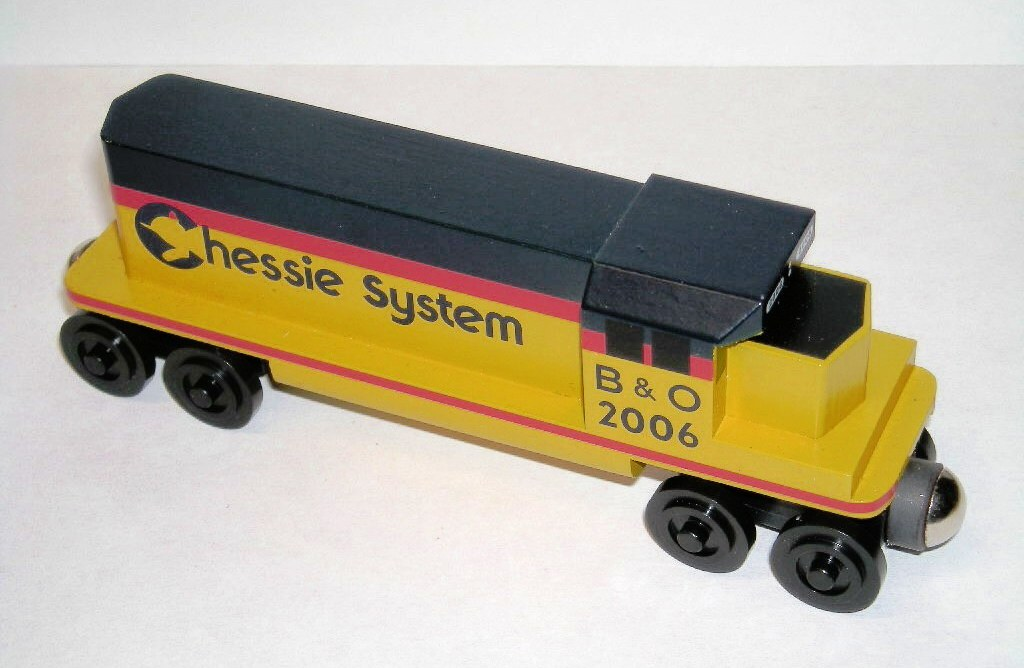
A colorful Chessie System GP40-2 from Whittle Shortline

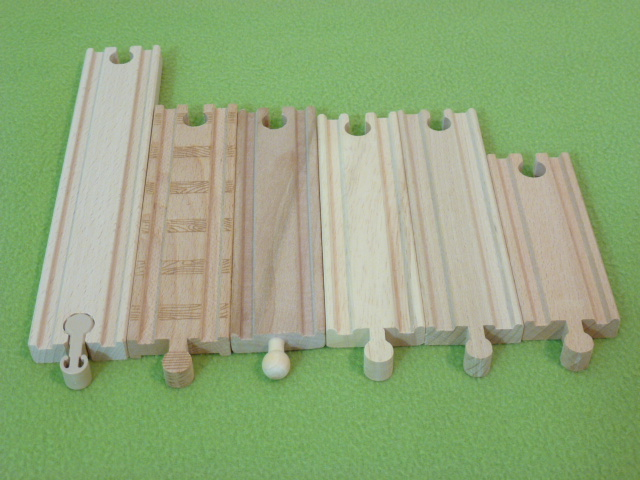
Samples of wooden tracks for toy trains. On the left is an IKEA version with the plastic connector. Beside it a Thomas & Friends version with indicated sleepers followed by a Tesco variant with inserted connector. On the far right is a track from Brio made entirely of fine grained beechwood

Wooden toy trains are toy trains that run on a wooden track system with grooves to guide the wheels of the rolling stock. While the trains, tracks and scenery accessories are made mainly of wood, the engines and cars connect to each other using metal hooks or small magnets, and some use plastic wheels mounted on metal axles. Some trains are made to resemble anthropomorphical, fictional, and prototypical railroad equipment.

== History ==
=== Early companies in the United States ===
Marshal H. Larrabee II founded the Skaneateles Handicrafters in 1936. This toy company made wooden toy trains and wooden tracks. The gauge was very similar to that used by most companies today. However, the connections for the track pieces were of a different design than the jigsaw style "peg and hole" system used today. The trains were made of maple and were often left unpainted and unstained. They are compatible with many brands of modern wooden train track. Playskool took over the sales for Skaneateles Handicrafters in 1956. This company retained the design and track-connecting system into the 1960s. Marshal H. Larrabee sold his company to the German-based Habermaaß GmbH in 1980. The company was renamed T.C. Timber and its products were manufactured in Skaneateles. The production line was closed in 2002.

The Jack-Built Toy Manufacturing Company founded by Ben Orel marketed its own range of wooden toy trains under the brand name "Jack Built Snap Trains" around 1956 to 1962. These were manufactured in Japan and used a snap system to join pieces of rolling stock and tracks. Rolling stock from Jack Built Snap Trains and Skaneateles Handicrafters could ride on either manufacturer's tracks. However, individual pieces of rolling stock and track from the two brands could not be combined. This is because the coupling systems for the tracks and trains were different.

California-based Ben Orel filed U.S. patent #2847798 in 1956 and was granted the patent for his "snap coupling" system two years later. He describes how the track could be rotated to create a "rail" and a "road" side in U.S. patent #3013726 submitted in 1960 and granted in 1961. This is similar to the idea that Learning Curve later used for their "Thomas & Friends" range. He also submitted a patent for magnetic couplings in 1958. This patent was granted in 1960. It may have been the earliest attempt to use magnets with a wooden toy train system. Production stopped in the mid-1960s and the company disappeared from the toy market.

=== Early companies in Europe ===
In 1957, BRIO, based in Osby in southern Sweden, introduced its wooden toy train system with wooden tracks in Europe. It may have been the first company to use the "peg and hole" system to connect the track pieces in mass production. The metal hook system for the rolling stock has since been replaced by magnetic connectors. BRIO was also one of the first companies to use beechwood for such products.

Another Swedish company that started producing a similar toy at about this time was Micki Leksaker in Gemla. It apparently produced its first wooden train sets for a Swedish department store in 1956, thus predating Brio by a year or two. In 1988 Micki started manufacturing products for IKEA and was the sole supplier of their wooden toy train line for about ten years.

There was a long tradition of wooden toy-making along the mountain forests surrounding Bohemia. Seiffen made wooden figures and Christmas decorations and Blumenau (today a part of Olbernhau) created building blocks and construction sets. Mass production techniques for polishing and coloring wooden toys were established and perfected in the Bohemian areas. Some of the early sets exhibited train designs that were later used for wooden track trains. In 1949, Hermann Eichhorn, of the Eichhorn family that made the PEWESTI wooden toys in Steinach, Thuringia, founded his company for wooden toys in the Bavarian town of Egglham. In 1961, he started producing his version of a wooden track railway system. Eichhorn claims that his company is the first to have systematically used the "vario system" for the connectors. Eichhorn applied for a U.S. patent for a "battery powered toy train" in 1994. In 1997 the company had to be sold to the Simba-Dickie-Group, which moved production to Unhošť, near Prague in the Czech Republic with a factory in Netvořice until 2022. By 1998 the company was fully integrated into the Simba-Dickie-Group. In February 1999 two fires totally destroyed the old factory buildings in Egglham and consumed most of the company's archives and work models.

Heros (He+ros), the company of Hermann Rossberg of Lam in the Bavarian Forest near to the border of Bohemia, influenced train design in the Blumenau tradition. He too started a line of wooden trains in 1968 to the same gauge, using bright colors in his train designs. In the 1970s the company experimented with plastic tracks based on the peg and hole design of the wooden tracks, but soon returned to normal wooden tracks. In 2010 the company had to be sold to the Simba-Dickie-Group. The train lines where dropped and the focus shifted to wooden toy blocks and the constructor toy range while Eichhorn became the only supplier of toy trains on a wooden track system within the Simba-Dickie-Group.

=== The 1990s, new companies and new ideas ===
John W. Lee founded the American company "Learning Curve Toys" in November 1992 with a wooden railway system called "Thomas the Tank Engine & Friends Wooden Railway" based on the characters from the British children's television series Thomas the Tank Engine & Friends. This made the wooden toy trains even more popular than before. Learning Curve introduced some new designs for the track surface, such as the "Clickety Clack" rails patented 1995 and the newer tracks in 2002 with a relief to supply better traction grip for battery powered four wheel drive trains patented in 1998. The Thomas brand of wooden trains continued to 2025 and where released by Mattel's Fisher-Price subdivision. The line was also rebranded as "Thomas & Friends Wood" from 2017 to 2021, but reverted to the original "Wooden Railway" branding in 2022 following poor reception and sales.

With the popularity of the toy system rising due to the success of Thomas the Tank Engine & Friends, new markets outside of the traditional groups and countries were opened. While companies such as Mapple Landmark adjusted its existing line of "Name Trains" to the gauge of the vario system in 1993, others such as Whittle Shortline, established in 1997, started producing rolling stock based on the more realistic designs of existing American examples. While Brio and Thomas the Tank Engine & Friends clearly favoured the steam engine era, Whittle Shortline expanded into heavy duty diesel engines of designs hardly known in Europe. In the product line "Trains of the World" shown in the Brio catalog of 1998, Brio presents several historic steam engines, such as the Mallard or the Flying Scotsman along with several modern high speed trains such as the Shinkansen, TGV or ICE. The only diesel unit is from the Santa Fe line.

Other companies such as Nilo and KidKraft concentrated on related items like train tables, among other products. Suretrack sells its track securing clips, and Choo Choo Track & Toy Co., founded in 1999, has concentrated on producing and designing tracks and accessories.

==== Subway & Commuter Rail Systems ====
A recent sub-genre has emerged based on real-life prototypes of subway and commuter rail rolling stock. One example is the "New York City Subway Wooden Railway" by the company named "Munipals" which sells units in each of the NYC subway lines colors & markings. They have recently expanded to commuter rail line rolling stock for New Jersey, Metro North, LIRR, and Philadelphia. The Washington DC Metro store sells rolling stock in each of the DC Metro line markings; as does the web store of the Boston T. The London Underground museum store sells rolling stock in the colors of each of the London Underground Lines. Whittle Shortline sells commuter rail line rolling stock for the Caltrain, Amtrak Charger, New Mexico Rail Runner, Tri-Rail, Metro North, and Metra systems, (while formerly offering products from New Jersey Transit, SEPTA, Manhattan Transit Authority, and Chicago Transit Authority); Bauer & Sohn has rolling stock for Berlin, Munich, and Nuremberg; Lalok, rolling stock for Vienna subway and tram. Make Me Iconic produces W class Melbourne Trams and the Sydney Ferry Sirius. Popondetta INC. started the brand Moku Train in 2018 with sets based on Japanese trains including Tokyo commuter and subway themes.

=== Electronics and Asian Production Sites ===
==== Electronics ====
Although the original push-along trains made mostly of wood still resemble the core idea of this system toy and as of 2006 form the base of all the involved companies' production lines, electronics have gained access to the wooden world. After introducing battery powered engines in the 1990s, remote control had been added by 2002, and so-called smart tracks introduced plastic parts to the wooden track pieces. In 2006 Brio even introduced a theme resembling electronic networking with some electronic gadgets. Altogether this has led to some new track designs allowing better traction for the self powered trains or means of communication between the tracks and trains using some magnetic or electronic gadget. In 2016 Brio introduced an app for remote controlling engines with a regular smart phone, followed by Hape in 2018 with a similar app.

==== Asian production ====
As with other toys, many wooden trains and track have been manufactured in China and other Asian countries in the twenty-first century. The lead paint problems of 2007 brought this to public awareness. Manufacturing in Asia goes back a lot further though: already in the 1950s the Snap-Trains of Ben Orel were made in Japan.

Probably the first major brand that was manufactured in China was the Chicago-based "Thomas & Friends Wooden Railway". Some of the design, such as the character faces and the spoked wheels, have stayed unique to the brand while other attributes, such as the modular build of the units with a rectangular single block chassis holding the wheels and individual buildup on top, have become widespread designs in China and elsewhere. Another major brand is Maxim. Starting with traditional rather plain and abstract designs, Maxim sold products under the name "Tumble Tree Wood" for retail stores. They have since adopted their current design with a winged number on their rolling stock. The main supplier is a factory in Dong Guan, China. The trains with the winged numbers are also sold by other brands such as Babalu in Germany. In 2004, Brio of Sweden moved most of their production to three factories in Guangdong Province, China. A more recent brand is Melissa & Doug that is also produced in China. Smaller projects were the short-lived ventures of Remus and Europlay.

A producer that has sold its products under very many brands including its own name is Mentari Massen, with its main factory founded in 1988 in Surabaya, Indonesia. Their items have been sold as sets or individually bundled under such brand names as elile, FunToys, Toytopia, The Toy Company, Bino, Snap on Tools and Bigjigs, as well as Mentari Toys or Mentari Group.

Plantoys of Thailand has been making children's toys and furniture from rubber wood, which has since been adopted by other companies. They have a range of car and city related sets that could be used as accessories for the wooden toy train ranges of other producers. They had a joint venture with Brio in 2001–2002, being present in the Brio catalogs of the time. By 2007 they had started their own line of wooden trains, expanding it in 2008.

In 1985, Bigjigs Toys Ltd started out by selling a large range of wooden jigsaws. Then in the 1990s they moved into the wooden railway market with a small core range of wooden railway system items. In 2007 they re-launched their railway range under the brand Bigjigs Rail, in new blue sky and green hills packaging. There are, as of 2012, over 130 pieces in the Bigjigs Rail range including sets, track and a range of real life engines such as Mallard, Duchess of Hamilton and Bluebell.

=== 3D printed revolution ===
3D printing brought new possibilities to many areas where at least some parts are printable. Wooden kind of tracks are well printable so there are numerous creators making their own pieces. They vary in compatibility level with original vendors, some are bound to few, some aim at universal connectability. There are copies of all basic pieces available on shelves and also many new creative track pieces that were never sold by anyone like robust bridge systems using many popular building toys such as Lego. Complex track building systems made as parametric models allow anyone to create the exact length or angle he misses on the market. Examples of these could be Tracklib that aim at planar tracks, or BeamBridge that is focused on robust multilevel bridge building using various building toys as pillars.

The same is true for buildings. There are copies of many original vendor designs and new creative buildings available only as free or paid models for printing.

== The track system ==
Although the products of many companies are quite compatible with each other they may vary in make, the wood used and some basic measurements. Popular woods used and advertised thus are beech, maple and rubber tree.

=== The gauge ===
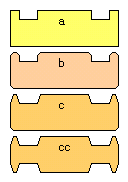
Profiles of wooden tracks for toy trains

Track grooves are 3 mm deep, 6 mm wide and have 20 mm between them (26 mm center to center). The tracks themselves are 40 mm wide and 12 mm high. To be kept on track the system can be reduced to a shallow groove 30 mm wide, as in some road systems or small ramps that allow the vehicle to get on or off the track from the floor, or to a middle section 20 mm wide and 3 mm high, as in some beginners tracks or double track road systems. Most modern track systems have a somewhat sophisticated profile with varying degrees of slanted sides for the grooves or rounded edges. In the imperial system the tracks have been described as having grooves an eighth of an inch deep, a quarter of an inch wide and with three quarters of an inch between them. The tracks themselves are one and a half inches wide and half an inch high. However, unlike other model railroading gauges, which have been formally defined by enthusiast groups such as the National Model Railroad Association or the Normen Europäischer Modellbahnen, there is no agreed gauge for wooden trains. The actual cross sectional profile of any given manufacturer's track is usually patented, compelling new manufacturers to alter their track design enough to allow compatibility with other brands without committing patent infringement.

=== Connection ===
Shapes and sizes of connectors differs as well. Here are some older types written in millimeters. Depth is distance from the end of the track to the center point of the cylinder or sphere. Due to the differences some tracks from different sellers cannot be connected.

Seller	Pin Diameter	Hole Diameter	Pin Depth	Hole Depth	Pin Neck	Hole Gateway
Tesco (sphere pin)	11.2	12.5	12.5	12.5	6.8	8.7
Tesco Carousel	11.2	13	12	12.5	5.7	7.6
Ikea (old, removable pin)	11.2	13	10.5	10	4.9	7.2

=== Flipping track pieces ===
Some track pieces such as curves and points have grooves on both sides so that they can be used from both sides. By flipping the piece around one can convert a left-hand curve or point to a right-handed one. Another possibility is to have the two grooves for trains on the one side and the single wide groove for roads on the other side. Ben Orel describes such a system in U.S. patent #3013726, which he submitted in 1960. Learning Curve made such tracks for their "Thomas the Tank Engine" theme.

=== The Vario system ===
When trying to document a layout with exact geometry one quickly notices that a lot of layouts one builds with real track do not work using a CAD system or some track layout program. This is due to the so-called "vario system" which allows some play when joining the tracks, so that with some wiggling around one can make layouts line up perfectly with no danger of derailing trains which do not use the exact geometry of the pieces. This is achieved by making the pegs somewhat smaller than the holes. Sometimes the round part of the hole is not an exact circle but rather an ellipse, allowing the tracks to connect with a small gap between them. Also, the neck gap does not have a sharp edge at the end of the track, but is carved round. This may have started as a production loss or to make it easier for small children to join the tracks. Some sources state that Eichhorn was the first to design connections using this system.

=== Some track and layout geometry ===
Though not all manufacturers use the same system for their track piece designs some principle standards have evolved, as the geometry involved with track systems tends to pose the same problems to everyone. The first question may be how to divide the circle. The standard for wooden tracks is eight pieces with diameter of 40 cm. The next important length is the diameter of the circle made of a line along the center of the tracks. This length is useful for figures such as an eight with the crossing at right angles, a simple L-figure, a bulge to one side or a spectacles or Mickey Mouse head, to name the simplest.

A division in two gives a handy piece of straight track. For the figure eight one could use two straight pieces to go underneath and a bridge made to the same length to cross over the other straights. If one wants a crossing on the same level, the diameter can be divided by three and a crossing piece made with straights of that length. Of course one can also produce pieces of a quarter diameter length to put to the left and right of a central bridge piece that is half the length of the diameter. As one can see, it is useful to determine the length of the straight tracks by dividing the diameter of the circle made by the curves. Brio uses lengths of half, quarter and eighth as well as a third and sixth. You can also find track sets with straight tracks of length 3/8 of diameter. While bends differ by millimeters at most among the manufacturers, the differences in straight tracks differ much more. However, the lengths of multiples of 5 cm should be compatible.

To solve problems of offset produced by points that branch out at the same angle producing parallel tracks, it is also useful to design such points and switches so that one of the short straights can compensate the offset. An easy way to design points is by tracing a long and a curved track to the same piece using the same connecting point as the origin. Such a merged piece can thus serve as a curve for one branch and a straight for the other while using the same dimensions as the other pieces.

=== Road systems ===
Several approaches have been made over time to add a road system to the railway tracks. The first and still most widely used level crossings use simple ramps that enable vehicles to cross the thick tracks from whatever underground the tracks are placed on. The simplest way to add roads to this existing solution is to provide a layout printed on a paper or plastic sheet or even a carpet that uses the dimensions of the wooden tracks. Some companies have made thin track pieces out of plastic or other materials that can be joined by some connecting system and have special crossover pieces to allow playing together with a wooden railway system. The next step seems to have been road track pieces of similar thickness as the railway tracks but using some other connecting design. Using the same "peg and hole" system as the railway tracks seems to have come later. The "Thomas the Tank Engine" theme from Learning Curve used track pieces that had the traditional railway design on one side and a new road design on the other using a design invented by Ben Orel in 1960. These roads had the same profile and measurements as the railway tracks, except that the part between the grooves was missing so that the road was a broad "groove" with sidings or curbs. The road vehicles and the railway rolling stock could be used interchangeable on both systems. Brio had introduced a track with wider grooves that was used for trains aimed at a younger age group. These used the same connection system as the other tracks and had the same distance between the grooves. This made it possible for the normal trains to run on the wider tracks. When these wide grooves have the same width as the "Thomas the Tank Engine" road pieces they can be used as a two way road. Other companies went in their own ways and even Brio made a wide two way wooden roadway. External widths of different vendors vary, but internal gauge dimensions are nearly same allowing some level of compatibility.

== The rolling stock and accessories ==
=== Design origins and developments ===
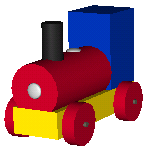
3d Ldraw rendering of a wooden toy locomotive in the style of HEROS around 1970

Early sets such as of Skaneateles, Eichhorn and Brio all seem to have used rather simple and abstract designs. The pieces were not painted, so that trains and tracks had the same surface. The normal early trains had engines and wagons each carved from a single piece of wood and connected by hooks and eyes. Painted sets may have become common in the early 1970s, as did the use of magnets as connectors. Engines carved from a single block were commonly painted black in Europe with bright red funnels and wheels. The early trains made with construction sets and large pull-along trains may have influenced other early train designs that were built of several wood pieces ("cut broomstick design" among others). Normally each wooden piece had its own color, thus an engine, for example, could sport six different colors: one each for the base plate, the cylindrical boiler, the drivers cabin, the cabin roof, the funnels and the wheels. Sets with painted patterns seem to have become more popular in the late 1980s and 1990s. This may have been due to the success of the "Thomas the Tank Engine" series and the wish for more realistic real world designs.

As of 2007 there seem to be several design trends:

- One group seems to emphasize the material wood. Some are simple "back to the roots" designs, while others take a more artistic approach, searching for new ways to abstract the train theme.
- Another group tries to stay true to the material wood but use more realistic designs with series based on famous real life trains.
- A modern view is to use more and more plastic and build battery powered and remote controlled objects, with electronic devices gaining ground.
- Specialty trains for specific purposes like alphabet trains and name trains, as well as decoration sets like birthday trains with candles and promotional designs for special events.

Train tables are a popular way to set up trains and railways, with fixed versions often placed in waiting rooms at hospitals, doctors' offices, or other places where some entertainment for children may be offered. This way they stay off the ground and it is not necessary to take apart the track after it is built. Wooden railway layouts based on the wTrak module standard have become part of model railroad shows in the United States - starting in the Pacific Northwest in 2009.

=== Bridges and tunnels ===
Early Skaneateles sets had rectangular supports that raised the track gradually. Due to the different connection system Skaneateles used at that time, tracks could be easily bent upwards at the connection point. The two-piece bridge with massive, self-supporting, ramps has been common since the 1960s. Provided with supports, this bridge could be easily elongated using normal straights. More modern bridge designs have used large amounts of plastic since the 1980s, reducing the amount of wood needed and thus producing lighter and cheaper designs. A sturdy basic bridge is the three-part bridge with the connections in the ramp section. Such designs seem to be aimed at the youngest players as they do not come apart easily. However, the design is not extendable. The two-part bridge led to the development of some raised track pieces. First versions had viaduct-like designs or sported some sort of gadget like a drawbridge. Later ramps were track bent in an S-shape. As these were not self-supporting, new sorts of elevated track pieces were introduced. These consisted of a short piece of track raised by four legs. These supports were stackable and based on a square design, so that the direction could be changed by a right angle turn on the different levels.

=== Buildings ===
Early buildings had windows and doors made by drawing lines in a single color on simple rectangular blocks. Sometimes they had slanted roofs made with another piece of wood, painted another color, stacked on top. A common early station design consisted of a simple platform with a roof on two or three supports along the longer axis. Later buildings have printed multicolor patterns. There have always been building sets that were similar to the popular wooden building blocks, allowing many individual designs. Since the 1990s building designs have become more sophisticated and interaction with the trains has increased. Learning Curve may have made this approach popular with many designs based on the story plots of the Thomas the Tank Engine series, such as a grain loader accessory or a logging mill.

=== Licensing and merchandise themes ===
- Sesame Street - (Playskool 70s?, Strombecker-Tootsie toys 1995), DealMakers 2008
- Thomas the Tank Engine - (Learning Curve 1993–2011, Tomy 2012, Mattel 2013–2025; second separate line by Brio 1996-2000)
- Lionel - (Learning Curve 1998, Maxim 2005, Imaginarium late-2000s to early 2010s, MasterPieces early 2020s)
- Jim Knopf/Button - (Euro-Play pre 2000?(Tesco?), Brio from 2000 on)
- Bob the Builder - (Brio 2001)
- Benjamin Blümchen - (Eichhorn 2001)
- Curious George - (Brio 2002)
- Busytown - (Brio 2002)
- Babar the Elephant - (Brio, France)
- The Little Engine that Could - (Maxim until mid-2005, Whittle Shortline from 2006 to 2023)
- Winnie the Pooh - (Strombecker-Tootsie toys 2004?, Eichhorn 2006, Brio 2008)
- The Polar Express - (Brio 2006, Imaginarium 2005–2013, MasterPieces around early 2020s)
- Mickey Mouse Clubhouse - (Brio 2008)
- Chuggington - (2010/11-17 as The Chuggington Wooden Railway, Moku Train 2021)
- Cars the Movie - (Wood Collection line from Toys “R” Us 2011, later Kidkraft)
- Porsche Racing - (Eichhorn 2019)
- Disney Princess - (Brio 2021)
- Peppa Pig - (several, among others Lidl 2023-25, Brio 2026)

== Brands ==
=== Asia ===
- China produces for many companies (Remus, Europlay, Babalu, Maxim, Early Learning Centre, Learning Curve, Brio, Sevi, Munipals). Most production seems to be centered in Guangdong and Zhejiang Provinces.
- The design with the winged number has been used by several companies. The first major company seems to have been Maxim followed by Babalu and Early Learning Centre among others.
- Zhejiang Siyu Toys and Crafts Co., Ltd., founded in 1973 produces for companies such as Melissa & Doug in the US or Top-Toy in Europe.
- Plantoys, founded in 1981 in Thailand. The company has specialized on using rubberwood. It produces a street system that is compatible with the wooden train tracks. They changed the connection system several times. For some time Plantoys used plastic connectors similar to those used by IKEA and Micki Leksaker; these fit into the all-female wooden road tracks. In 2007 Plantoys started its own line of train tracks and rolling stock, using the established peg and hole system for rail tracks and magnets for the rolling stock, although it was changed to a clipping system later on. The brand eventually rebooted its wooden train line with simplistic undetailed trains and magnet couplings. Plantoys introduced a "Rubber Road" system in 2021 that has adapters to the wooden track systems.
- Mentari Toys, founded 1988 in Surabaya, Indonesia, where the production still is, while international sales are directed from offices in Taiwan. Products may have been sold under the brands elile, FunToys, Toytopia, Bino and Kidkraft.
- The Toy Company sells in Germany under the brand name Beeboo, also sells Mentari sets under its own label.
- Moku Train, a brand of the Japanese company Popondetta, sold Shinkansen themed trains in 2018 and has since extended to tracks and accessories. Most models are based on existing Japanese trains.

=== Europe ===
- Brio, Company founded 1884 in Osby in southern Sweden. Has produced wooden railways since 1957. Proventus, a Swedish Investment company became the major shareholder in 2004. BRIO was acquired by the Ravensburger Group on January 8, 2015.
- Eichhorn, Company founded 1949 in Egglham in southern Germany. Has produced wooden railways since 1961. Sold to Simba-Dickie-Group in 1997.
- Heros, Company founded by Herrman Rossberg in Lam in southern Germany. Started producing trains in the wooden railway gauge in 1968 using plastic tracks of the style introduced by Child Guidance Toys but changed to wooden tracks in 1983. Sold to Simba-Dickie-Group in 2010. Ceased producing wooden track systems as of 2013. In 2025 Heros joined the Tactic Group.
- Micki Leksaker of Sweden. Has produces wooden railways since 1956. Was supplier for IKEA in the 1990s.
- Hartung, Berlin Germany. May sample some sets with products from different manufacturers.
- Babalu, sold only by Karstadt, Germany, produced in China. Some items may be of the same origin as for Maxim and Imaginarium.
- Bino, sells Mentari Toys sets. Old street systems with "double" peg and hole connections have been replaced by single middle line peg and covered hole connections, thus making the connection invisible from the top when assembled.
- Spielmaus, a home brand of Vedes toy shops, Germany. Has made use of many manufacturers, such as Eichhorn in the 1960s or Mentari as of late.
- PlayGo, a brand of the Steckstäbi company, founded by Rudi Stäblein in Bad Liebenstein. He patented a system for wooden construction toys in 1995. The trains of this brand can be taken apart and put together again to build something else. In that respect it is somewhat similar to the system of Hybo. The connection system itself is reminiscent of construction sets of the 1920s and 1930s.
- Playtive, a brand sold by Lidl
- Hornby, toy train line by Hornby Railways of England. Stopped making wooden toy trains a few years ago.
- Ikonic Toys, wooden toy brand from Holland.
- Tesco, sold at the Tesco stores may be related to Euro-Play
- Tarnawa is a polish wooden company manufacturing ecological toys in Europe since 1934 (tarnawaeu.com).
- Bigjigs Rail is the wooden railway system from Bigjigs Toys Ltd. There are over 130 different items in the Bigjigs Rail Range, compatible with all other wooden railway systems. Bigjigs trains and accessories were sold in French-speaking regions of Canada under the Pierre Belvéderé name.
- Sio is a Dutch toy factory which produced wooden toys and trains.
- Kids-Wood, had a wooden toy train line including a road system. It was a brand of the Danish TOP-TOY company sold in the BR toy shops. Top-Toy A/S and BR Leksacker filed for bankruptcy on 28. dec. 2018. The company was restructured as brands of the Salling Group in 2019.
- Early Learning Centre has its own range of wooden toys under its brand name "Wooden World". This includes wooden cars and railway systems (mainly of the type produced in China) although they also sell the "Thomas & Friends" items from "Learning Curve" as of 2008. Some of the Maxim tooling was reused for certain Early Learning Centere products.
- Sevi, a toy company of northern Italy founded in 1831 in Val Gardena, and acquired by the Trudi Company in 1998, also offers wooden train sets. These are designed in Italy but produced in China.
- Hybo from Symplo, a toy company from Pavia, Italy. The modular HY-per BO-ard system connects a modular system of connectable boards with groves in the same scale as the wooden railway systems with a peg-and-hole building system. Some of the modules provide connection points to regular rails. The rolling stock and other vehicles are compatible with the "Vario" system.
- John Crane Ltd., founded in 1984, is a toy company based in Northampton in the UK. The company offers sets in its Tidlo line (introduced 2010) in its Small World category. In 2010 it became the distributor to retailers in the UK for the Italy-based company Sevi.
- IKEA Lillabo, the furniture brand from Sweden produces its own wooden train sets. In the 90s Micki Leksaker of Sweden was the supplier.
- Squirrel Play, a brand of Smyths Toys Superstores used for wooden toys has a line of wooden toy trains.

=== North America ===
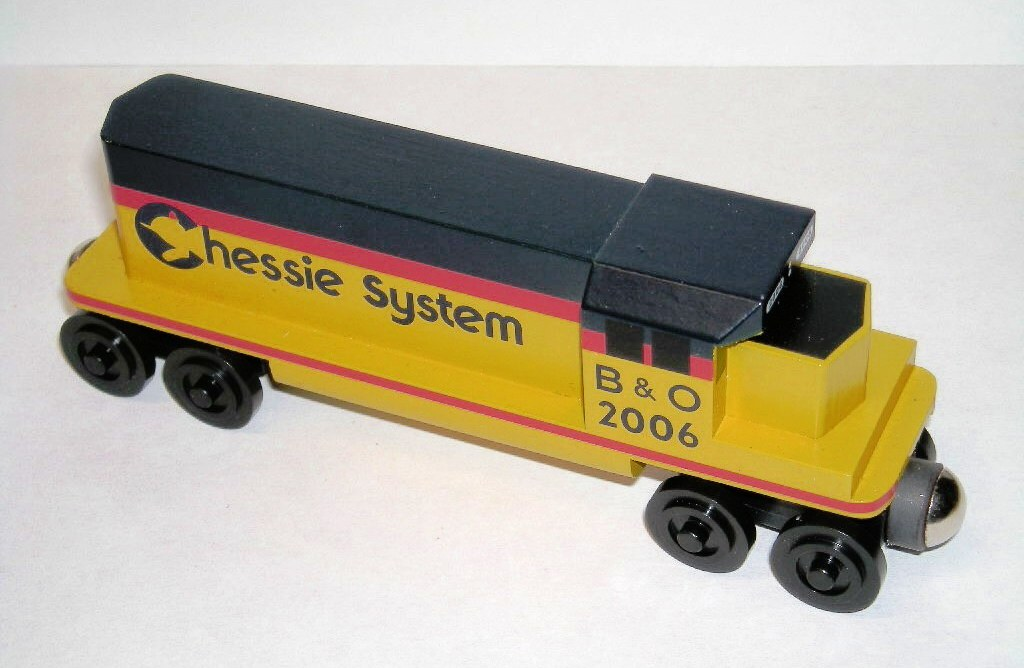
A colorful engine patterned from a Chessie System GP40-2 by Whittle Shortline Railroad.

- Skaneateles Handicrafts - T.C.Timber - Habermaas, Company founded 1936 by Marshall Larabee in Skaneateles NY in the northeast of the US. Claims to have invented the wooden track gauge. Was purchased by Habermaas Corporation of Germany in 1980. All trains produced under the TC Timber brand after 2002 are made in Germany.
- Learning Curve (1993–2011), Tomy (2012), Mattel (2013–Present) Thomas and Friends Wooden Railway (1993–2017, 2022-), Thomas and Friends Wood (2017–2021): Learning Curve was founded in 1993 by John W. Lee in the US. They produced trains based on the Thomas the Tank Engine and Friends characters. Roy Wilson helped design many of the early trains and destinations, which laid the groundwork for future wooden Thomas releases. Learning Curve was later purchased by RC2 in 2003, who in turn was purchased by Tomy in 2011. Mattel took over the line in 2013 under their Fisher-Price subdivision, and rebranded the line to "Thomas Wood" in 2017 with redesigned engines and track system. Track adapter pieces were released to connect the new track system with the universal track system found in most brands such as Brio and older Wooden Railway releases. The line later returned to the "Wooden Railway" branding in 2022 with the original track system restored.
- Maple Landmark Woodcraft, Company founded 1979 by Mike Rainville in Vermont, US. Has produced trains for the wooden track system gauge since 1993.
- Whittle Shortline Railroad - Originally born out of a gifted miter saw, the company was founded in 1997 by Mike Whitworth, which is now based in Kirkwood, Missouri. Whittle Shortline has focused on crafting true-to-life replicas of authentic American rolling stock (with some fictitious offerings, but the company is best known for their realistic trains) and have been highly praised among consumers and collectors. While it mainly focuses on replicas of real-life mainline trains, joint ventures with The Little Engine That Could, the VeggieTales franchise, and operational excursion railways have released throughout the span of the company (Whittle currently focuses on corporate-run rail networks, such as Metra and CSX Transportation). Whittle Shortline trains saw all-time high sales during the 2007 Chinese export recalls when people turned to American companies for their products after companies such as RC2 Corporation recalled wooden Thomas the Tank Engine and Friends character train cars. Whittle has gained some notoriety among consumers for being one of the more expensive options, and for collectors, having some of the rarest discontinued wooden trains on the market. Despite this, Whittle still has a dedicated fan base.
- Choo Choo Track & Toy Co, established in 1999 in Pacific, Missouri, has concentrated on track and accessories, using mainly American beech as the wood source. Originally a source of track for Whittle, Choo Choo Track & Toy Co is both a producer and online retailer of track, bridges, tables, and other accessories. Track is available as individual pieces or in complete sets. Wooden track and accessories are compatible with Thomas the Tank Engine and BRIO wooden track systems. While Choo Choo Track & Toy Co had originally acted as a third-party supplier for Whittle Shortline Railroad trains, in the mid-2000's, Choo Choo Track & Toy Co pulled out of the joint venture, and about a decade later, started making trains of their own. One of their most popular products is a wooden 4014 Big Boy, the first commercially available wooden railway Big Boy.
- Heritage Wooden Railway - Stationed in Concord, New Hampshire, the company (which is a division of AeroPro Promotions, LLC, that creates custom products and scale models for its clients) focuses on creating mass-produced custom wooden trains for passenger train lines, such as the Amtrak company, and museums such as the B&O Railway Museum, the Virginia Museum of Transportation, and the Mt Washington Cog Railway. The company does not offer retail sales, they base all of their designs and sales directly to the railroads, museums or individuals buying in bulk.
- Lionel had produced a special line of realistic trains together with Maxim in 2006. They have now moved on with another joint venture with a company named MasterPieces. Before the Maxim joint venture, Lionel had partnered with Learning Curve to create the "Great Railways Adventures" series of battery-powered trains that were compatible with Brio-style trains and track. A specialized plastic track that snapped together was used in place of the traditional peg-and-hole system, although adaptors were sold with sets.
- Suretrack, produces securing trackclips.
- Nilo, produces flexible tracks.
- MeskoToys a division of MeskoTech, Inc., an engineering company founded in 1996 in Ann Arbor, Michigan. They produce track and accessories, using mainly American "tree-cycled" solid maple hardwood as wood source. Their speciality is track crosses and switches of unique design to build layouts otherwise not possible with traditional standard track pieces.
- Maxim Enterprise has been making toys since 1962. The company had a joint venture project with Lionel that started in late 2005, which in 2006, introduced a line of realistic trains under the Lionel brand name. Maxim has also produced trains in collaboration with excursion and commuter railroads such as the Strasburg Railroad, the Tweetsie Railroad theme park, the Brightline high speed train line, the MBTA Transit Authority, and others. A majority of the Maxim products are now being sold under the SainSmart Jr. name on retailers such as Amazon.
- Munipals, [sic] a division of Fay Graphic Design Ltd, based in Shelter Island, NY. "Munipals" specializes in producing subway and commuter train models for the MTA, CTA, New Jersey Transit, and SEPTA. The MTA trains can be found in the New York Transit Museum's gift shops.
- Imaginarium / Universe of Imagination, brand sold by Toys "R" Us which restarted its wooden toytrain line there in 2001. Founded as "Imaginarium Toy Centers, Inc." the company originally focused on educational toys. It was purchased by Toys "R" Us in 1998 for 43 million dollars. Toys "R" Us closed most of its stores worldwide in 2018 after filing for bankruptcy. Some items may be of the same origin as for Maxim and Babalu.
- Melissa & Doug, founded in 1988, have a line of train tables and complete wooden train world sets.
- Kidkraft, a producer of child-related furniture started to sell train sets for its train tables. They have also produced tables and sets for the Cars movie franchise.
- Kid Connection, a generic brand of train sets that used First Learning wooden railway tooling, which was sold in Walmart from 2001 to 2007.
- Orbrium Wooden Railway, a new-age wooden train producer founded in 2011, has gained momentum on sites like amazon. Known for their 12-piece gift set boxes, they have sold many track expansion packs containing, barges, tunnels, crossings, etc. Their rise in popularity has been attributed to an increase in online shopping sales.

=== Oceania ===
- Kmart's Australian chain has it own brand of wooden trains sold under the “Anko Wooden Train Set” name.

== See also ==
- Model railroad layout
- Plarail (similar gauge but plastic)
