= Lamaze (disambiguation) =

Lamaze most commonly refers to the Lamaze technique of natural childbirth

Lamaze can also refer to:

- Lamaze Infant Development System, a line of baby toys

== People with the surname Lamaze ==
- Fernand Lamaze (1891–1957), French physician who invented the Lamaze technique
- Eric Lamaze (born 1968), Canadian showjumper
