= Mr. Bubbles =

Trade name for bubble blowing solution

Mr. Bubbles is one of several brand names that have been used by an entity variously known as Chemtoy, Tootsietoy, and StromBecKer for its bubble-blowing solution. The company is currently owned by J. Lloyd International and markets under TootsieToy. J. Lloyd International also owns the rights to the name StromBecKer. It still contains a traditional "magic wand".

The formula of Mr. Bubbles is proprietary and is among those preferred by bubble trick performers such as Sterling Johnson to make up part or all of the mixtures they use. It is also used by Cirque du Soleil.

Mr. Bubbles celebrated its 75th year of operation in 2008 with the release of several new products, such as a classic Mr. Bubbles Figure Bank, which converts to a piggy bank when the solution is gone.
