= Tomica (toy line) =

Line of toy vehicles made by Takara Tomy

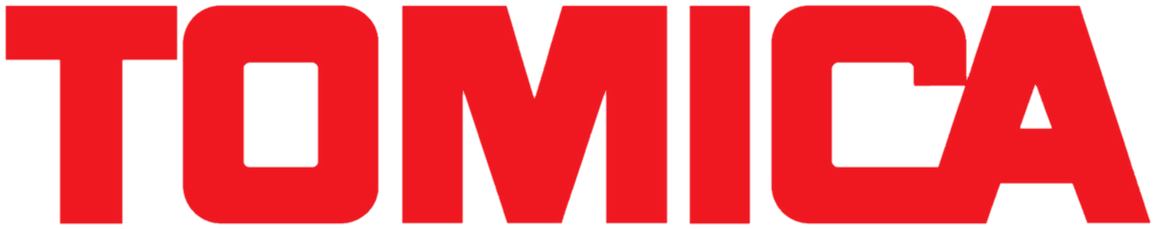

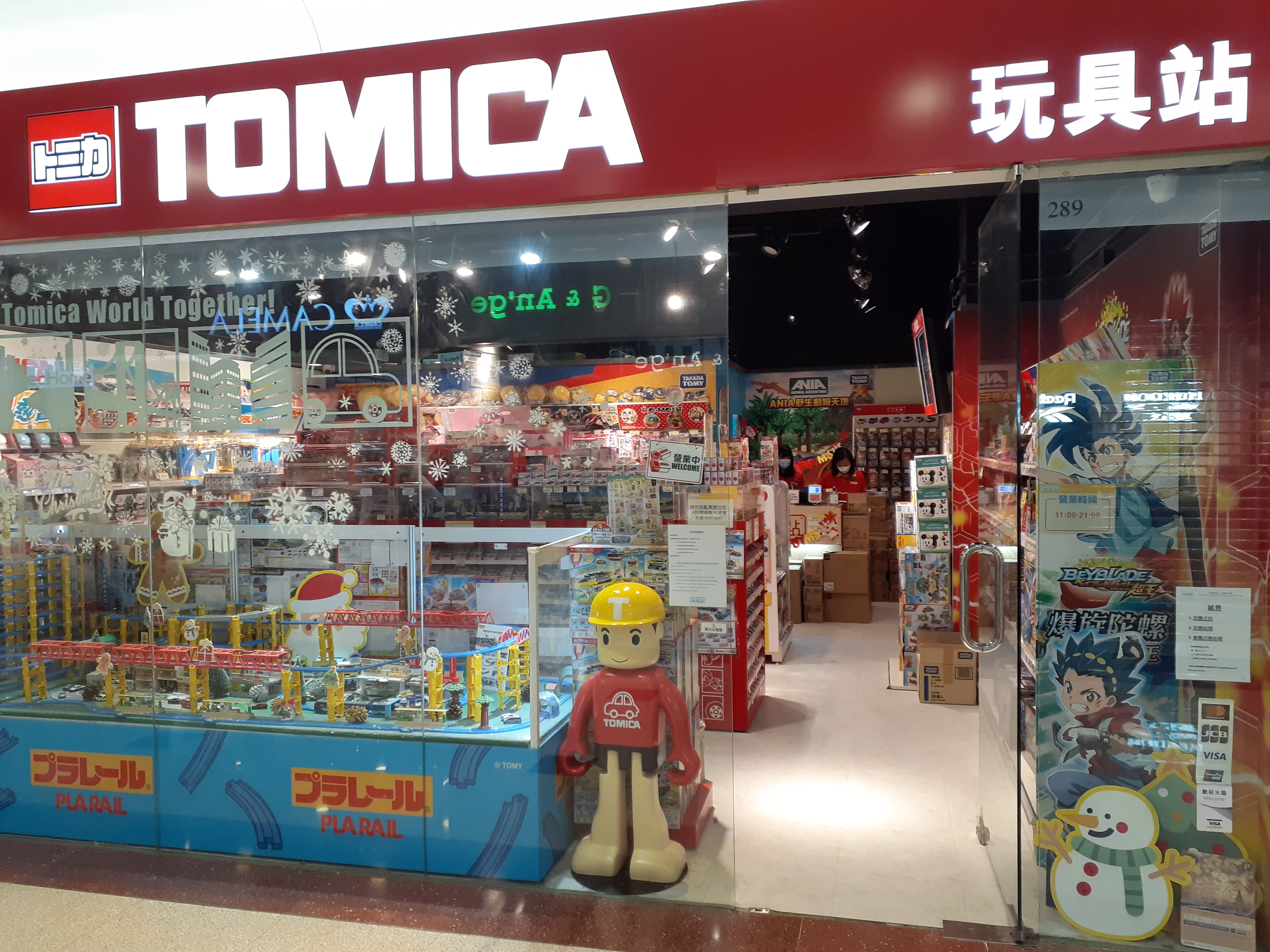
- Tomica store
- Product type: Scale model cars
- Current owner: Takara Tomy
- Country: Japan
- Introduced: 1970; 56 years ago
- Markets: Worldwide
- Website: takaratomy.co.jp/tomica

Tomica (トミカ, Tomika) is a line of die-cast toy vehicles (mainly cars) produced since 1970 by Takara Tomy Co. of Japan (formerly known as Tomiyama and Tomy Kogyo Incorporated). Ostensibly, Tomica diecast were an outgrowth of Tomica World, an autonomous toy line of motorized train accessories that Tomy had created based on Plarail and produced since 1959. Similar in concept, Tomica can be thought of as the "Japanese Matchbox", but focuses mainly on Japanese brands.

== History ==
Tomy Co. of Japan was founded in 1924 by Eijira Tomiyama in Tokyo. The company has produced a variety of toys, but in 1970 started production of the Tomica line of diecast vehicles as a result of the surge of interest in the global market in toy cars which was led mainly by Matchbox and Hot Wheels. Although models of various scales have been made, the name "Tomica" normally refers to the 3-inch sized mainstream vehicles most commonly produced by the company. Originally, the name "Pocket Cars" was given to Tomicas sold in the 1970s in the United States. After four decades, Tomy Corporation again entered the North American and European markets with the Tomica name in 2010.

== Typical Tomicas ==
=== Tomica Domestic Series ("Black Box" / "Red & White Box") ===
Initially, Tomica only produced Japanese brand cars and trucks. This started with the release of six models in 1970. The seventh was issued later in the year. From that time, the Tomica line grew until there was a total of 109 concurrent models by 1978 – number 1 through 108 and also number 110 (109 was proposed, but never released). The variety of models also expanded from the initial coupés and sedans to taxis, buses, trucks, construction and other commercial vehicles. Even a steam engine and an ocean liner were offered. As new models were issued, each was assigned a number up to 110, replacing an existing model.

In the early 1980s, Tomy experienced financial difficulties, and in 1983 the domestic model line was reduced to only 80 models (nos. 1 – 80). These models were mainly packaged in picture boxes that had black background with yellow flaps. Later, new models came in a box with a red and white background. Existing models issued before 1984 kept using the older style box with black background until 1988, when all boxes were updated to the new style. Hence, domestic models are commonly referred to as the "black box" or "red and white Box" models.

=== Tomica Foreign Series ("Blue & White Box" / "Pocket Cars") ===
To compete in the global toy car market, Tomy early on, had plans of exporting its models. This was done starting in 1974 with the appearance of "Tomy Pocket Cars" in Canada and the United States. The marketing ploy was a blister package designed like a denim jeans 'pocket' with yellow 'stitching' around the outside of the card and the vehicle. Since Japanese cars were not yet booming sellers overseas, in 1976 Tomy started producing 'foreign' (non-Japanese) models. Present were American, German, Italian, British, and French cars, among others, making the Tomica product line more global.

Partly because Pocket Cars were more expensive than Hot Wheels or Matchboxes in the American market, this blister pack series was not seen much after 1979. Tomica continued successfully, however, in the home market, where each foreign car was packaged in a picture box that showed a flag of the country of origin of that particular car. The boxes often did not show the number of the car, but it could be seen on the base. Since these boxes have the base colors of blue and white, they are also called the "blue-and-white box" models. At any one time, a total of 70 models were produced under the foreign line, numbered F1 to F70.

These cars from the 1970s and 1980s hold their value well. As of 2019 they sell for between $15 and $20 US on eBay and other on-line sales sites. Perhaps because of their greater scarcity as well as realism, these values hold up much better than most Matchbox vehicles from the same time period.

=== Tomica Common Series ("Red-and-White Box") ===
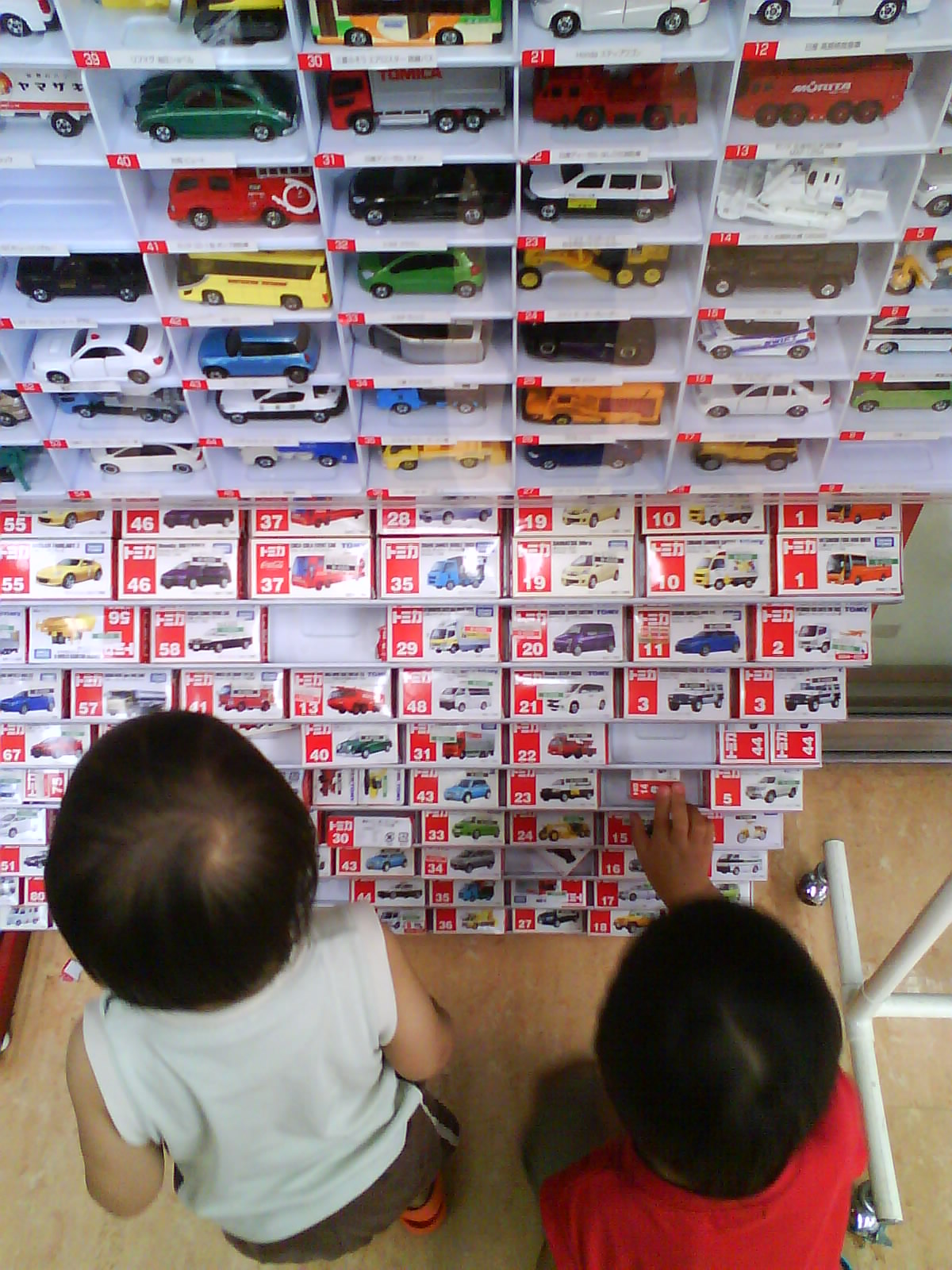
Common series sales shelf in Japan

In 1988, Tomy combined its foreign models into the domestic series. Most of the first 40 models from the foreign series were added to the 80 domestic models. Those foreign models that got transferred were assigned a number that was its F series number plus 80. A handful of these foreign models were discontinued after a few months' appearance under the new line. Overall about half of them had been discontinued after two years.

=== Tomica Limited Series ===
From 2001 to 2013, Tomy produced the TL series targeted for the collector. These models are made with higher details, and one of their biggest features is realistic-looking wheels with rubberized plastic tires. Although many of them are based on existing or discontinued regular Tomica models, some are new castings made exclusively for the TL line, namely, Nissan Skyline GTB, Toyoda AA, and new MINI Cooper. In the case of the new MINI Cooper, the model was first released for the TL series in 2004 but in 2006 included in the regular line as no. 43. Model numbers started at 0001. Each model is produced for a limited period of time, so models with smaller numbers are discontinued while new models with higher numbers continue to appear. These models are packaged in open cardboard boxes surrounded on four sides with a transparent plastic sleeve.

=== Tomica Premium Series ===
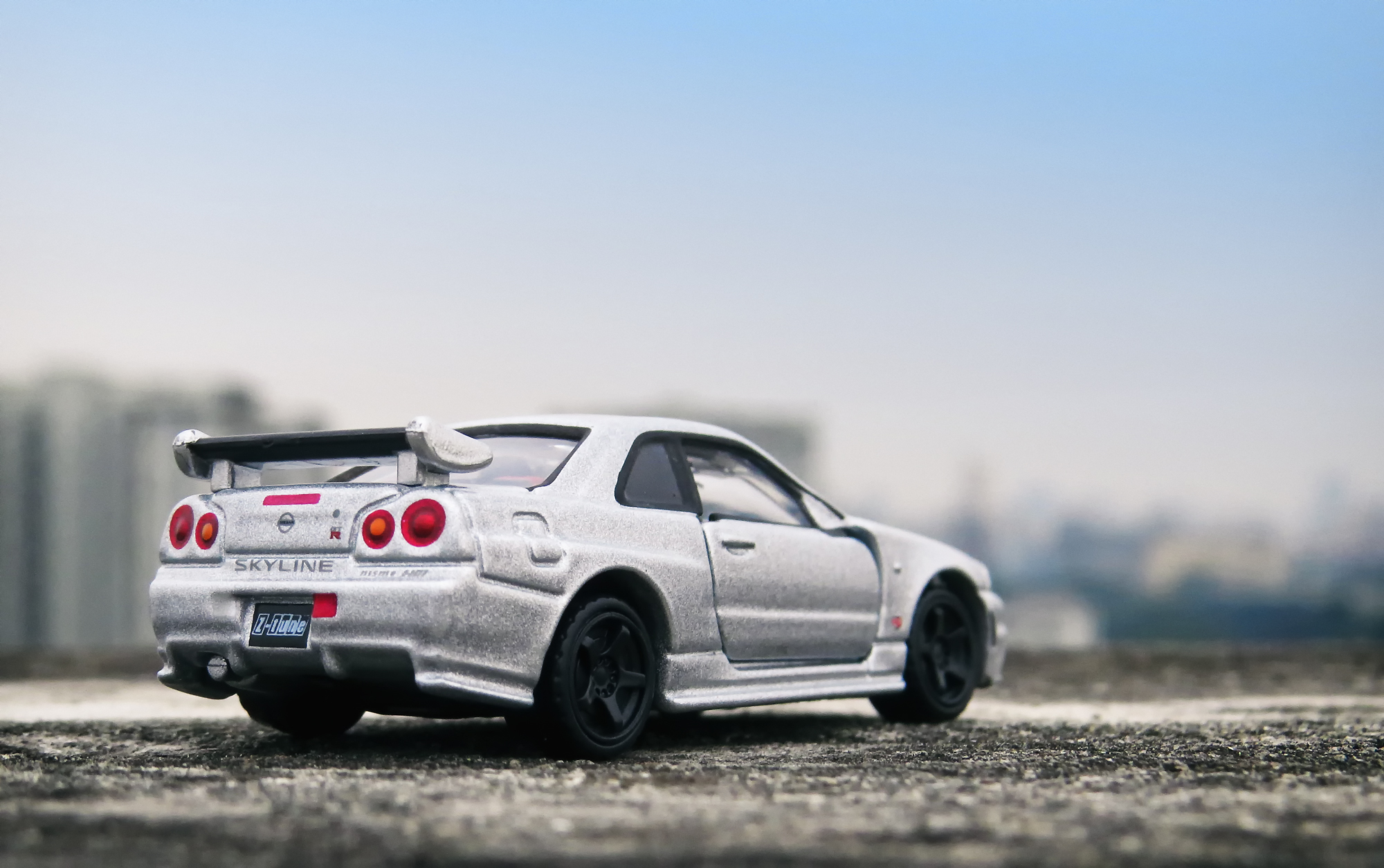
Tomica Premium No. 01 Nismo R34 GT-R Z-tune, the first model in the series.

Tomica started to offer the Tomica Premium Series from April 2015. The Premium line replaced Tomica Limited Series, the main differences being that it uses new molds for the vehicles and are not a limited release but rather in regular production that numbered with the same scheme as the classic line (re-using numbers for unrelated models). They were also aimed at a younger audience.

The Tomica Premium Unlimited line was introduced in September 2021. It featured cars from various licensed properties, such as movie and anime franchises. Earlier releases were packaged in a plastic blister packaging, with the car being placed atop a small box that was similar in size to the Dream Tomica series, while later releases transitioned to being packaged in a larger box.

=== Special, Promotional and Event models ===
Tomica has produced a number of special models over the years. These are unique models that are not found in the regular line or the Limited Series. There are four types of special model:

- An existing regular model with small modifications or additions of accessories. These can be in the form of TEM (Tomica Event Models, Tomica shop exclusives, as well as gift/box sets).
- A truck model that shares the cab and the chassis of an existing model. These are also common for gift sets although also found as stand-alone models.
- A model that is based on an existing model but has the major car body modified. Examples are:
  - Honda S800M Convertible modified from no. 23 Honda S800M
  - Mitsubishi Pajero Rally Type was modified from no. 30 Mitsubishi Pajero Metal Top. This model was produced for the Ralliart Team Set.
  - Toyota Sprinter Trueno AE-86 Hatchback, modified from no. 78 Toyota Sprinter Trueno Coupe. This was produced for the Initial D Set.
- A totally new casting. All of these had been produced under the contract of another model company or another business. Their common fate is that Tomy eventually issues them as regular models. Examples include:
  - Nissan Skyline GT-R R33 Racing Type (issued as no. 40 in 1997)
  - Mitsubishi Lancer Evolution IV (issued as no. 104 in 2000)
  - Mitsubishi New Canter Panel Truck (issued as no. 29 in 2003)
  - Subaru Legacy Touring Wagon (issued as no. 11 in 2003)
  - Hummer H2 (issued as no. 15 in 2007)
  - Nissan Laurel (issued as no. LV-52 in 2007)
  - Isuzu Giga (issued as no. 76 in 2007)
- Also, in 2004, no. 121 was available for a limited period from Mitsuoka Motors. This was a 1/1 scale electric single seater vehicle which featured a retro Citroen H Van front end and side panels.

=== Japan, China, Hong Kong, Thailand, and Vietnam Castings ===
Until 1993, Tomica models were almost exclusively produced by Tomy in their local factory in Tokyo, Japan. However, since the early years, Tomy had outsourced some production to another country with cheaper labor cost. By mid-2003, all production were outsourced and Tomy no longer produced any Tomica in their own factory.

Hong Kong was the first place outside of Japan where Tomica cars were produced. The production in Hong Kong only lasted a few years. Six models issued in 1971 and 1972 were made in Hong Kong:

- 1971 - No. 10 Honda N360
- 1971 - No. 11 Toyota Sprinter
- 1971 - No. 12 Mazda Capella Rotary Coupe
- 1972 - No. 30 Mitsubishi Galant
- 1972 - No. 33 Nissan Cedric
- 1972 - No. 42 Datsun 1300 Pick-Up

Limited production in China started in 1990 with a few existing models in the regular line, like the no. 35 DOME Toyota Celica and no. 73 Isuzu Dump. Large scale production in China started in 1993 with the "British Line" of 36 models that Tomy Company of UK contracted Tomy of Japan to produce by using existing tooling. As a result, regular models of the same castings were also made in China beginning in 1993. Starting in 1994, all the new models in the regular line were made in China, and in May 1995, the production of existing models started to move to China as well. This was done in phases. By July 1997, all regular line Tomica cars were made in China. There were a few exceptions to this rule:

- No. 9 Komatsu Power Shovel PC200, issued in 1995, was made in Japan because the model was already planned in 1994 and also because it shared components with the older no. 9. Production was moved to China when the model was produced for a gift set later in 1995.
- No. 20 Nissan Skyline GT-R R33, issued in 1995, was made in Japan because the model was also used for special releases under the contract of II ADO, a popular chain of minicar shops in Japan. Production was moved to China in 1997 along with others during the last phase of moving.
- No. 30 Mitsubishi Pajero, issued in 1999, was made in Japan because the model was concurrently issued as a special promotional model for Mitsubishi Motors in Japan. Production moved to China after two months, when the promotion stopped.
- No. 105 Coca-Cola Route Truck, issued in 1996, was made in Japan as well. However, this model was simply a different colour and livery on an existing casting, so it was not truly a new model.

While production in Japan ceased in 1997 for the regular models, Tomy kept producing special models in Japan until 2003, using old castings not used for mass production of the British line, regular models, or gift sets. Because these older castings had remained in Japan, special releases and promotional issues using these older castings were still made in Japan. New castings for special models were also made in Japan. The Subaru Legacy from 2003 was the last Tomica ever produced in Japan.

Production of Tomicas started to move to Vietnam in early 2009. This was also done in phases and took several years. Unlike the move from Japan to China during which no new regular models were made in Japan (besides the few exceptions), during this time new releases came from both Vietnam and China until 2013.

In 2010, when Technology Tomica was introduced, they were initially made in Thailand. In 2012, production moved to Vietnam.

=== Wheel styles ===
The earliest Tomica cars had one-piece chrome-plated wheels. Starting in 1971, models were produced with two-piece wheels of various styles, with the one-piece chrome-plated wheels being phased out in 1972 (except that all the models made in Hong Kong had the one-piece wheel design). The two-piece wheels were used until 1977, while newer one-piece wheels of various styles have been adopted since 1976, and are still used today.

The most common design is a five-spoke chrome on black plastic form that appears to have five (four before 2007) 'studs' around the edge of the wheel (It is commonly referred to as the 4/5 studded wheel). This design has even been continued with the newer vehicles made in Vietnam. Another common style is a black plastic wheel with a width greater than the standard 4/5 studded wheel with a single chrome ring and no other outstanding detail (This is a reference to racing wheels). Later Tomicas have a slightly redesigned wheel design, with the 'studs' slightly smaller. Some SUVs (e.g. Nissan X-Trail, Mitsubishi Pajero) have a 4-spoke chrome with grooves on the outside.

== Other series ==
=== Long Tomica ===
New long vehicles from the Tomica regular line are a bit smaller than the original Long Tomicas.

Longer buses and semi-trailer trucks were models not suitable for the regular small boxes, so Tomy also started the "Long Tomica" series in 1977. Castings such as trucks, articulated buses or Shinkansen trains were produced as single models until 1993. However, some of these long models still appeared in gift sets after 1993, such as the JAL Airport Vehicles Set. Many of these were specifically for foreign markets, like the Trathen's Skyliner bus which made the Plymouth to London trek in the U.K. Beginning in 2009, Tomy produces newer versions of "Long Tomica", such as the newest Shinkansen trains or large semi trailer trucks, as part of the regular series under model numbers 121 to 140.

=== Combat Tomica ===
In 1973, Tomy produced the 1/87 diecast Combat Tomica series. The line started with the model M-60 U.S. Army Medium Tank, and later on, models such as the U.S. M-60A-1E-1, the German TIGER-I, the Japanese Type 61 and the Russian SU-85 were produced. There were two types of Combat Tomica but they both contained exactly the same models. The first one was like regular Tomica models; the models came in a paper box, there were some soldier figures for decoration and a set of wheels because the tracks were fixed and did not actually function. The second type was the metal model kits that required manual assembly. These came in larger boxes inside containing the parts for assembly. Production of the Combat Tomicas lasted only a few years, due to high costs. However, Tomy continued producing military vehicles such as rocket launcher trucks, troop trucks, and jeeps, for its regular "3-inch" line-up.

=== Tomica Dandy ===
Tomica Dandy Nissan Bluebird in 1/35, one of the larger scale. Most cars were 1/43.

Tomica Dandy cars are larger - about 1:43 scale and were produced from 1972 until 1993. At first they were all Japanese domestic models, but similar to the common Tomicas, the Dandy line also began to offer foreign brand vehicles in 1977 (for example, a Lotus Europa). The numbering system was changed in 1984 based on the nature of the vehicles (e.g. emergency, police, or foreign models). In 2001, Tomy reissued six Tomica Dandy models in limited quantities.

Dandys were diecast metal and most also had metal bases. Wheels looked authentic, but were hard black plastic and not rubber, which was normal for 1:43 diecast cars in the 1980s. Some Dandy cars had special features like the Mazda Savanna with "pop-up" headlights operated from a lever inside the car. Packaging colors varied and some were promotional models, but commonly, boxes were blue or red showing a perforated license plate shape with 'Dandy' written on the plate. Tomica Dandy castings have also been used in gift sets and the Limited S Series, but these models have the "Dandy" name on their base plates removed.

=== Motorized Tomica ===
B/O Tomica came in a picture box while the later Motor Tomica came in a window box.

Tomy started producing motorized cars in the late 1970s beginning with the Power Tomica series. This series did not last long. In 1992, it released a new series called B/O Tomica (stands for battery-operated Tomica). This series was renamed Motor Tomica in 1997. They were produced and sold as single models until 2003. All the B/O Tomica are made in Japan, while all the Motor Tomica (including the Animated Motor Tomica) are made in China. To fit on the motorized base, these castings often have altered scales. In general, sport utility vehicles appear in their proper scales, saloons appear a bit bulky, and buses and lorries are disproportionately short. In 2005, a new series for motorized Tomica was released containing generic vehicles such as a police patrol car. This late series targets toddlers and is made of ABS plastic.

=== Pullback Tomica ===
These first appeared in the 1980s and there were six models at that time. In the year 2002, Tomy again produced pullback models.

=== Sound and Light Tomica ===
Left: Sound Tomica from 1992. Right: Technology Tomica from 2011.

From time to time, Tomy produces shorter runs of cars with sound or light or both, based on castings from the regular series. The first of such series was the Sound Tomica, introduced in 1992. These cars have both sound and light. Upon pressing one set of wheels, the sound and light are activated for a short time. The Siren Tomica series from 1996 replaced Sound Tomica. These are basically the same design except the batteries can be taken out and replaced. In 2000, Tomy came out with the Chat Tomica line. These cars do not have light, but depending on the model, upon activation, "[t]hree types of recorded clips will be played (including the sound of sirens, voices and cries of animals).". Conversely, the Technology Tomica cars introduced in 2010 only have lights. What is special is that they do not require batteries. Rolling the cars produces the electricity to power the lights. This line also represents the only made-in-Thailand Tomica in existence to date. Most recently, Tomy has released the Tomica 4D line. These cars have engine sounds and vibrations.

=== Tomica Limited Vintage ===
Starting from 2004, Tomytec, a branch of Tomy, started producing realistic models - more for the collector market. They are marketed as the Tomica Limited Vintage Tomytec series and are mostly 1950s and 1960s classic Japanese vehicles such as the Honda S800, Nissan Cedric, Prince Gloria and Toyopet Crown. More details are evident on these compared to the regular Tomica models or even the Tomica Limited models.

In 2006 the Tomica Limited Vintage - Neo [TLV-N] line was created and currently includes vehicles from the 1970s and 1980s. As with the Limited Vintage series, the focus of the Limited Vintage - Neo series is on adult collectors. These models have a high level of realism, with more attention to details such as wheels, tires, paint, trim and emblems versus functions like opening parts or moving features but still has the suspension of the basic Tomica models. All the models are a consistent scale of 1/64.

The Tomica Limited Vintage Neo line focuses mostly on Japanese street cars manufactured in the late 1970s and onwards, but movie and TV drama vehicles and special race cars have also been introduced. Examples are cars from 80s police dramas such as Seibu Keisatsu and Abunai Deka or the JGTC Super Silhouette Skyline. Export versions of cars are also included, such as an American Datsun 510 instead of a Japanese Nissan Bluebird. More recently, as formerly late model vehicles progress into classic status and Japanese vehicles from the 1990s and 2000s become globally desirable, there has been an increase of 1990s cars released, such as the EF/EG/EK Honda Civic, the R32 Nissan Skyline GT-R and the Honda NSX.

=== Special character cars ===
A Snoopy family car and a Mickey Mouse car based on regular Tomica Datsun No. 1

In the early years, Tomy produced cars with famous characters sitting on them, using the same castings from the regular Tomica line. The first of such was the Snoopy character cars from the 1970s. Tomy did not market and distribute these cars. Rather, they produced these for Aviva, who sold the toy under the Aviva brand name. In the early 1980s Tomy produced models with Muppet characters. Also in the 1980s, Tomy started producing vehicles with Disney characters under the Putica Disney series name. This popular series was made until the late 1990s and was also re-issued in the original style boxes sometime during the 2000s.

Circa 1990s, when Tomy created a cartoon called "Tomica Rescue", it started another series using regular Tomica models and some Matchbox models with some add-ons such as cannons, armors and water hoses. In 1996, a series specially designed for the Japanese comic or cartoon "Bakuso Kyodai Let's & Go !!" (爆走兄弟レッツ&ゴー) was initiated. Then came the "Mach Go Go Go" ("マッハGoGoGo", localized as "Speed Racer" in the West) series in 1998. In 2002 a series called Magnum Rescue was launched, and designed very much like today's Tomica Hyper Series. Unfortunately, due to safety issues, the Magnum Rescue Police Cruiser was recalled soon after its release.

In 2005, to celebrate the 60th Anniversary of the renowned Thomas and Friends, Tomy started a Thomas the Tank Engine series. In recent years, Tomy has greatly expanded their specialized character Tomica series. Offerings include "Tomica Hyper Series", the Cars (Disney/Pixar animation) series, Pokémon, Ridge Racer, the Disney Motors series, Fast & Furious, and racing anime and manga, such as Initial D and Circuit no Ōkami.

== See also ==
- Choro-Q—produced by Takara, Tomy's former rival
- Dot-S
- Micro Machines
