= Pop-up Pirate =

Japanese luck-based game

- Manufacturers: Tomy
- Players: 2–4
- Age range: 3+
- Skills: Luck

Pop-up Pirate is a popular luck-based game for children manufactured by Tomy. It originated in Japan in 1975 under the name Blackbeard Hair Trigger (Japanese: 黒ひげ危機一発, Hepburn: Kurohige Kiki Ippatsu) and has seen many iterations over the years.

== Rules ==
The pirate is placed into a spring-loaded barrel and rotated to randomize the unlucky slot. Players must take turns to insert plastic swords into slots in the side of the barrel. If a player inserts the sword into a specific slot (which changes randomly every time the game is played), the pirate is launched out of the barrel, and the player is eliminated. The last player remaining after all others have been eliminated wins.

== Educational value ==
According to Dominic Wyse, a professor of early childhood and primary education at University College London, the game improves children's motor skills, as well as in common with other games promoting turn-taking and having fun together with others.

== Variations ==
Themed version
Alongside a Sanrio-themed variant such as Pop-Up Kuromi, alternate versions replacing the pirate with other subjects have been released. One of the first being a Super Mario World-themed version released exclusively in Japan. Many versions have since followed, including Hard Gay, Monkey D. Luffy, The Good Dinosaur, Like a Dragon, a Buzz Lightyear–themed version to promote Toy Story 4, and many others replacing the pirate with different characters. One of the first variations of these to be released in America was a Darth Vader–themed version called Pop Up Darth Vader. Other variations of the game include Frozen, Despicable Me, Jurassic World, and Curious George.

Pop-up Pirate Treasure Island
A variation of Pop-up Pirate, Treasure Island adds board game elements by having players race to be the first person to collect six gold coins from a treasure chest Blackbeard is guarding. Only one key opens the treasure chest though.

== Video game ==
Party Fun Pirate Pop-up Pirate!
- Publisher: Tomy
- Platform: Wii (WiiWare)
- Release: JP: November 25, 2008; NA: April 13, 2009; EU: February 13, 2009
- Genre: Other
- Modes: Single-player, Multiplayer

Tomy has also released a video game version of Pop-up Pirate. Available as a WiiWare game, it was released in Japan on November 25, 2008, and in Europe on February 13, 2009. The North America version is titled as Party Fun Pirate, which was released on April 13, 2009.

The game is essentially a digital version of the game, but also includes a single player logic puzzle mode. Players are also able to replace the pirate with one of their own Miis.
