= Maple Landmark Woodcraft =

American toy company

Coordinates: 44°2′11.4″N 73°10′1.3″W

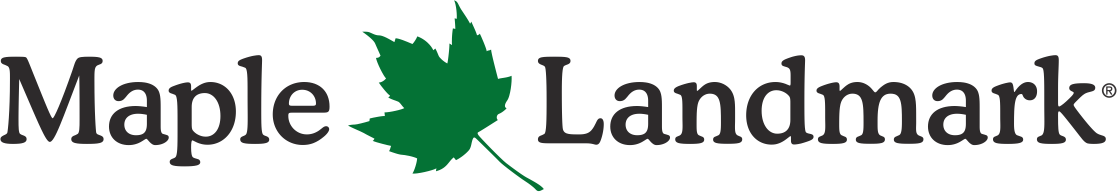
- Company type: Privately held company
- Industry: Manufacturing, retail
- Founded: 1979
- Founder: Mike Rainville
- Headquarters: Middlebury, Vermont
- Area served: Worldwide (primarily United States)
- Key people: Mike Rainville (CEO)
- Products: Wooden toys
- Brands: NameTrains Wooden Railway System; Montgomery Schoolhouse; Schoolhouse Naturals
- Number of employees: 40+
- Website: Maple Landmark Woodcraft

Maple Landmark Woodcraft is a wooden products manufacturer located in Middlebury, Vermont. Founded in 1979 by Michael Rainville, the business is known for crafting American-made wooden toys, games, and gifts. Notable product lines include the NameTrains Wooden Railway System, Montgomery Schoolhouse, and Schoolhouse Naturals.

== History ==
=== 1970s ===
Mike Rainville first came to woodworking as a hobby when he was 11. At that time, his mother, Pat, told him that, “he needed to find something to do.” Rainville's grandparents had a history of working with their hands, specifically woodworking and farming, so there were always materials around to utilize. Rainville made his first items, spools and bobbin holders, in his parents’ basement in Lincoln, Vermont, using some spare wood, a coping saw, and a sanding block. As time progressed, he started making cribbage boards which are still being made today. Local craft fairs provided him with income to purchase new equipment and materials. By 1979, Rainville had established his first wholesale relationship.

=== 1980s ===
Rainville continued making product as he worked his way through Clarkson University, frequently returning to Lincoln on weekends. After graduating in 1984, he set about constructing a new woodshop of sufficient size for his now-full-time business. The name “Maple Landmark Woodcraft” was also adopted. This name was an extension of Maple Landmark Homestead, the family maple sugaring business and dairy farm.

In 1987, Maple Landmark acquired Troll's Toy Workshop of Barnet, Vermont. This addition brought in many alphabet-themed products, including letter cars, blocks, and signage letters. The company quickly grew to warrant more full-time employees.

=== 1990s ===
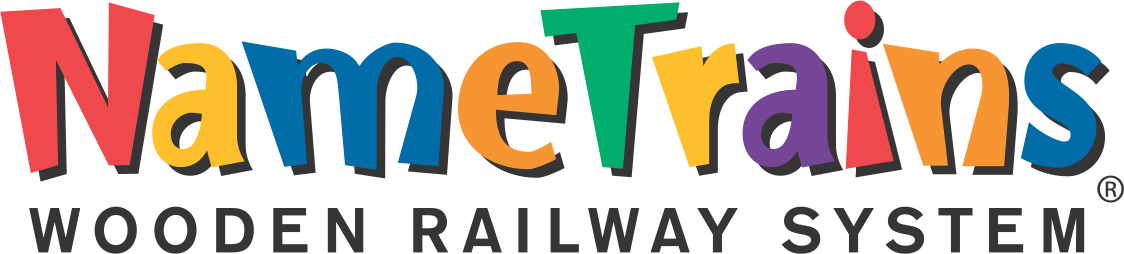
NameTrains logo

The product line evolved over the following decade, adding items such as trivets, ornaments, and the first NameTrains, a derivative line of the Troll's Toy Workshop line alphabet letter car line. Originally finished with a clear coat, the NameTrains rapidly increased in popularity. As more retailers expressed interest in having colored letters, a non-toxic color dye stain was developed and the first colored NameTrains appeared on the market in 1994.

Production of these new products made space tight in the Lincoln facility by late 1994. With no room to expand, the decision was made to build a new shop in Middlebury, Vermont that would have easier access to raw materials and a retail space for visitors to shop for products year-round. Maple Landmark moved into the new shop on Exchange Street in Middlebury in 1996. The original woodshop still exists in Lincoln, though mostly used for storage, and is usually referred to as “the Old Shop.”

With the need to keep up with product demand, both in quantity and quality, investments were made in lasers and additional CNC routers. These machines allowed for more production in less labor-intensive manners. The lasers also gave Maple Landmark the ability to add graphic designs to products, creating the option to do custom work alongside regular production work.

More products and more machines required the enlargement of the Middlebury factory to 15,000 square feet (1,400 m^{2}) in 1999.

=== 2000s ===
In 2001, Maple Landmark purchased Montgomery Schoolhouse of Montgomery, Vermont, another long-established Vermont-based wooden toy producer. The acquisition was inspired by Rainville's desire to not see the Montgomery Schoolhouse name, products, and history lost and forgotten. All operations were consolidated in Middlebury and, moving forward, products were redesigned to be more efficiently produced. Through the changes, the names and integrity of the products lines were maintained.

The economic downturn in the early-2000s impacted business as toys, games, and gifts were often bought with discretionary income. Low growth continued until the summer of 2007 when products from other countries and manufacturers were being recalled for child health and safety reasons. These recalls boosted Maple Landmark's business in late 2007 and 2008 with consumers looking for products and companies that they could trust. Simultaneously, Maple Landmark Woodcraft developed the Schoolhouse Naturals line of products, featuring simple engraved wooden toys without any finishes. This product line was popular among consumers that were particularly concerned about chemicals.

In January 2009, Maple Landmark created a wooden souvenir train for the United States presidential inauguration following the election of Barack Obama in 2008.

=== 2010s ===
In an effort to stay flexible and innovative, Maple Landmark purchased several printers that allow for full color printing on wood. These additions allowed for more colorful and intricate designs, both in standard and custom product.

In January 2013, Maple Landmark created a wooden souvenir limousine for the United States presidential inauguration following the reelection of Barack Obama in 2012.

In 2014, Adam Rainville, Mike's older son, returned to the business after studying at Clarkson University.

In 2016, an 11,000 square feet (1,000 m^{2}) addition was completed on the Middlebury factory, bringing the total to 28,000 square feet (2,600 m^{2}). The three-year project allowed for more production and packing and shipping space.

The Vermont Small Business Administration named Mike Rainville the Vermont Small Business Person of the Year for 2017. Also in 2017, Andrew Rainville, Mike's younger son, returned to the business after studying at Rensselaer Polytechnic Institute.

== Products ==
Maple Landmark crafts a wide variety of wooden products from toys, to games, to gifts. Some product lines include NameTrains, Wooden Railway System, Hang-A-Name, Montgomery Schoolhouse, Schoolhouse Naturals, Solace, and Peterson Birds.

== Affiliations ==
Maple Landmark is affiliated with many industry and regional organizations such as the Vermont Wood Manufacturer's Association, Wood Products Manufacturing Association, American Specialty Toy Retailing Association (ASTRA), Vermont Chamber of Commerce, Vermont Attractions Association, and Addison County Chamber of Commerce.
