= Lamaze Infant Development System =

Line of baby toys

Lamaze Infant Development System is a line of baby toys belonging to Takara Tomy, which acquired the former owner, RC2 Corporation and its subsidiary Learning Curve Brands, in 2011. The name Lamaze is licensed by Lamaze International, a Washington, D.C.–based nonprofit organization. The toys are developed in collaboration with Jerome and Dorothy Singer, psychologists at Yale University.

Lamaze's toys are designed based on a three-step model of infant development which consists of the stages "awakening the senses", "exploring and experimenting", "moving and doing". Although Lamaze toys are marketed as being based on scientific principles, they do not supply any academic research to back these claims.

According to The New York Times, "RC2 has emerged in the past few years as a popular link in the toy manufacturing chain, connecting media outlets like Disney, Nickelodeon and Discovery Communications with inexpensive labor in China." In 2006, 91.8 percent of RC2’s products came from China.

== Related pages ==
- Tiny Love

Baby Development
