= Shilav Group =

Israeli baby products and toy retail company

- Native name: שילב
- Type: Private
- Industry: Retail; toys; children's clothing
- Founded: 1974
- Founders: Isaac Oren; Shosi Oren
- Headquarters: Israel
- Area served: Israel
- Products: Toys; baby products; children's clothing

Shilav Group (Hebrew: שילב) is an Israeli company that operates a chain of toy stores in Israel, a line of developmental toys for babies, and a line of apparel for newborns, infants, and toddlers.

== History ==
Shilav was founded in 1974 by Isaac and Shosi Oren, a husband-and-wife team, as a "one-stop shopping" store for baby needs. The name "Shilav" is a Hebrew acronym for "Direct marketing to the maternity home".

Shilav launched its Tiny Love line of developmental toys in 1993. Tiny Love has competed successfully with giants of the toy industry such as Fisher-Price.
