= Plan Toys =

Toy manufacturer in Thailand

Plan Toys (stylized as PlanToys) is a sustainable toy manufacturer in Trang, Thailand. Founded in 1981 by Vitool Viraponsavan, they use rubberwood, a sustainable by-product of the latex industry's harvesting of trees used for natural rubber production once their productivity declines. Using the trees as a resource in this way for wooden toys made by Plan Toys is environmentally responsible. Plan Toys uses as their primary manufacturing material preservative-free rubberwood and non-formaldehyde glues, as well as recyclable packaging and water-based inks. Their products are marketed as "green", and are recognized as such by various buying guides endorsing green products for children.

== Distribution ==
Starting in January 2002, Plan Toys products were distributed worldwide by Swedish company BRIO. After the downfall of BRIO US in 2006, Plan Toys opened its own distribution unit in the US. Distribution in the whole of Europe is by Plan Toys Europe (PTE). Plan Toys is present in Japan with a company called Plan Toys Japan.

== Products ==
In 2009, Plan Toys collaborated with French design school École Camondo to produce two toys that promote the discovery of nature: Louis the Elephant and Tsu Tsu the rolling rattle.
