= Tomy =

Japanese toy and entertainment company

Tomy Company, Ltd.
- Logo used since 2006

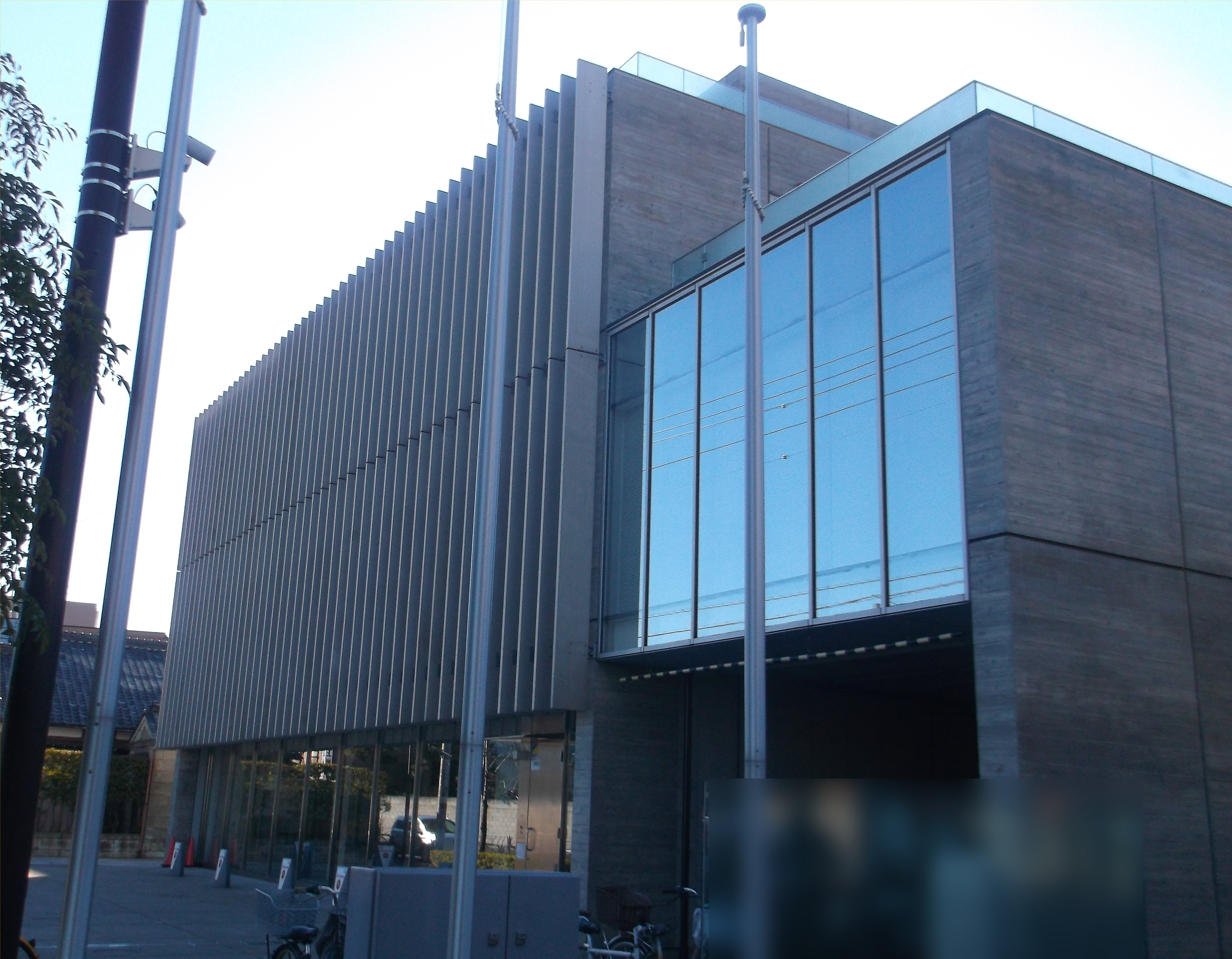
- Headquarters in Katsushika, Tokyo
- Trade name: TakaraTomy (mostly in Japan and Asia); Tomy (mostly in Western countries)
- Native name: 株式会社タカラトミー (Note: Previously spelled as 株式会社トミー (Kabushikigaisha Tomī) from 1989-2006)
- Romanized name: Kabushikigaisha takara tomī
- Formerly: Tomiyama Toy Company (1924-1927); Tomiyama Factory (1927-1952); Sanyo Toy Manufacturing Works (1952-1953); Sanyo Industrial Co., Ltd. (1953-1963); Tomy Industrial Co., Ltd. (1963-1989)
- Type: Public
- Traded as: TYO: 7867
- Industry: Toys; Video games; Children's products and apparel
- Predecessor: Takara Co., Ltd.
- Founded: 1924; 102 years ago (brand); January 17, 1953; 73 years ago (company)
- Headquarters: 7-9-10, Tateishi, Katsushika, Tokyo, Japan
- Area served: Worldwide
- Key people: Kantaro Tomiyama (chairman); Kazuhiro Kojima (president & CEO)
- Brands: Tomica; Licca-chan; Beyblade; Plarail; Ania; Pop-Up Pirate; Zoids; Punirunes; Transformers (within Japan); Ertl
- Revenue: ▲¥250.24 billion (FY 2024–2025)
- Operating income: ▲¥24.87 billion (FY 2024-2025)
- Net income: ▲¥16.35 billion (FY 2024–2025)
- Total assets: ▲¥164.6 billion (FY 2024–2025)
- Total equity: ▲¥101.5 billion (FY 2024–2025)
- Owner: Tomiyama family through Tsukasa Fudōsan KK (7.94%)
- Number of employees: 2423 (Consolidated as of March 31, 2024)
- Subsidiaries: T-Arts; Tomytec; Tomy Marketing; Tomy Ibis; T-Fieldtec; Kiddy Land; Penny Company; Tinkerbell; Wako Company; Tomy International, Inc.; Tomy Europe (Holdings) Limited; Tomy (Hong Kong) Ltd.; T-ARTS KOREA Company, Ltd.; Tomy (Thailand) Ltd.; Tomy (Shenzhen) Ltd.; Tomy Southeast Asia (Philippines) Ltd.; Tomy Asia (Taiwan) Ltd.
- Website: takaratomy.co.jp; www.takaratomy.co.jp/english/company

Tomy Company, Ltd. (Japanese: 株式会社タカラトミー, Hepburn: Kabushikigaisha Takara Tomī; trading as TakaraTomy in Asia and Tomy elsewhere) is a Japanese toy and entertainment company. It was established in 1924 by Eiichirō Tomiyama as the Tomiyama Toy Manufacturing Company (Note: Japanese: 富山玩具製作所) became known for creating popular toys like the B-29 friction toy and luck-based game Pop-up Pirate. In 2006, Tomy merged with another toy manufacturer, Takara, and although the English company name remained the same, it became Takara Tomy in Asia. It has its headquarters in Katsushika, Tokyo.

== History and corporate name ==
=== Before the merger ===
Final logo as Tomy, used from 2000 to 2006, currently in use for Tomy International.

The company was named Tomy as an abridgement of Tomiyama, which was the founder's surname. Starting as a manufacturer, Tomy had the largest product development team in the toy industry and plaudits for its technology. Nonetheless, by its third generation, president Mikitaro Tomiyama decided to streamline the company to be more competitive with wholesaler Bandai. Bandai developed its products more quickly, which was more appealing to television properties that required a fast turnaround. Despite internal and external opposition, Tomiyama was determined to aggressively pursue TV licenses such as Akakage, Giant Robo and Osomatsu-kun.

Tomiyama was shocked when his son told him that Tomy's toys were bad and that he wanted to work for Bandai when he was an adult. In response, Tomiyama created the moderately successful Zettai Muteki Raijin-Oh (then Genki Bakuhatsu Ganbaruger), but the product development team followed these with Nekketsu Saikyō Go-Saurer, which was a catastrophic failure. However,Tomy then established a relationship with Shogakukan and created the successful Wedding Peach and Let's & Go.

Tomy learned about the growing popularity of Pokémon through the monthly CoroCoro Comic and obtained the commercial rights. Bandai at the time was busy with its big hit, Tamagotchi, and was not interested in Pokémon. Tomy acquired the rights to commercialize a wide range of merchandise, mainly toys, and released the "Monster Collection" of figures next year. The Pokémon anime became a huge hit, and sales of related products doubled. The success of the Pokémon license in 1996 significantly boosted Tomy's domestic market share. This period marked a peak in the company's growth, solidifying its position as one of Japan's top two traditional toy manufacturers alongside Bandai.

In 2001, competitor Takara's hit franchise Beyblade and Pokémon's slump saw Takara regaining second place and Tomy falling back to third place. However, Beyblade subsequently faltered, which adversely affected Takara's fortunes. Tomy merged with the suffering company, and they became Takara Tomy).

=== After the merger ===
The company decided to use the name "Tomy" in international subsidiaries, and "TakaraTomy" in Japan and Asia, because Tomy had built considerable international brand recognition while Takara's products (Microman, Transformers, Battle Beasts, Beyblade, B-Daman etc.) had been sold and branded by other toy companies such as Hasbro. Additionally, the financial cost of rebranding was prohibitive.

In Western media, the TakaraTomy merger was typically characterised as a 'takeover' of Takara by Tomy (likely because several years of losses had put Takara in a financially weakened state at the time of the merger (although Takara did have significantly higher sales than Tomy)). However, the companies' management teams had previously discussed merging (including at times when Takara appeared stronger). Under Japanese corporate law, the move was a merger of both companies on an equal basis.

Post-merger media speculation about the control of brands from the TakaraTomy merger arose from the new use of a "TOMY" copyright on all packaging (including former Takara brands shipped by Hasbro) (but this was merely a consequence of the decision to use only the Tomy name in international subsidiaries). In Japan, TakaraTomy continues to use both Tomy and Takara as distinct brand names on toy ranges which originated in each separate company, and most new toy ranges or stand-alone products now carry the new TakaraTomy brand.

Takara purchased a majority stake in Tatsunoko Production in June 2005. The studio then became a full subsidiary of Takara Tomy following the March 2006 merger until Nippon Television Holdings bought out the majority of Tatsunoko's stake in 2014. Tomy UK was founded in 1982 for the sale and distribution of Tomy products in Europe, and it has successfully brought toys such as Zoids, and games like Pop-up Pirate, to the West. Tomy UK's slogan has traditionally been "Trust Tomy". In 2006, Tomy UK launched a website on which consumers can buy online from Tomy's catalogue. In early 2011, Takara-Tomy acquired RC2 Corporation and the RC2 sub-brand Learning Curve, which included The First Years, Lamaze, and Compass.

=== Rebranding into TakaraTomy Corporation ===
On November 11, 2026, Tomy announced a new logo redesign and brand refresh and would rebrand itself and be unified to TakaraTomy Corporation with the Tomy name being dropped for good. Their current logo will be retired on April 1st 2027, after being used for 21 years. The new logo features a symbol based on the katakana word "Asobi" (Japanese: "play"), which also references Takara’s old slogan "play is culture".

== Products ==
The Tomy Pocket Game Shooting Gallery was manufactured in 1978.

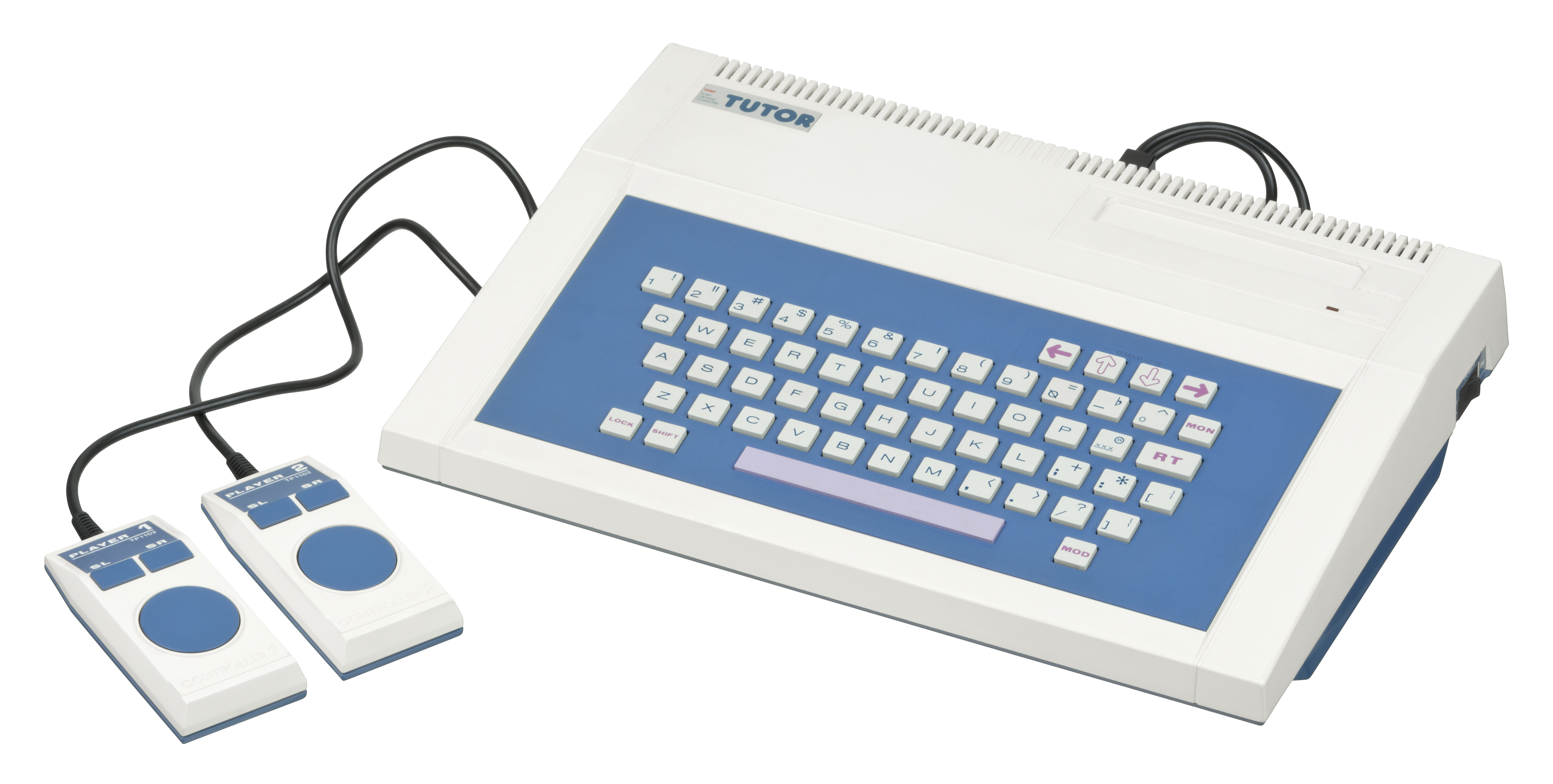
The Tomy Tutor, a 16-bit home computer released by Tomy beginning in 1982

Takara-Tomy has manufactured a broad range of products based on its own properties which include, from the Tomy side: Tomica, Plarail, Zoids, Idaten Jump, Nohohon Zoku and Tomy branded baby care products, and, from the Takara side: Space Pets, Choro-Q (also known as Penny Racers), Transformers, Beyblade, B-Daman, Koeda-chan (also known as Treena) and Microman. The merged Takara-Tomy also produces and/or sells a wide variety of toy and game brands under license, such as Thomas & Friends, Astro Boy, Pokémon, Duel Masters, Disney, Naruto, The Game of Life (also known as Life Game), Rock Man (also known as Mega Man), Wedding Peach, Mermaid Melody Pichi Pichi Pitch, My Hero Academia, Cardcaptor Sakura, Cardcaptor Sakura: Clear Card, Slayers, Revolutionary Girl Utena, Kirarin Revolution, Sugarbunnies and Animal Crossing. Tomy's rights to these licenses vary by region. One of the first examples of product synergy for the merged company was the combining of Takara's Jinsei Game (Game of Life) license and Tomy's Pokémon license to produce a Pokémon Jinsei Game.

Tomy sells many products worldwide, including baby and pre-school toys, baby monitors, mechanical and electronic games, consumer electronics, children's arts and crafts products, and a vast range of toys suited to girls or boys. They make a large selection of Disney, Pokémon and Thomas& Friends merchandise. They also publish video games in Japan (mostly based on Zoids and Naruto anime series), and was previosuly responsible for the distribution of some Hasbro products in Japan, such as Play-Doh, Jenga and Monopoly.
