= Vedes =

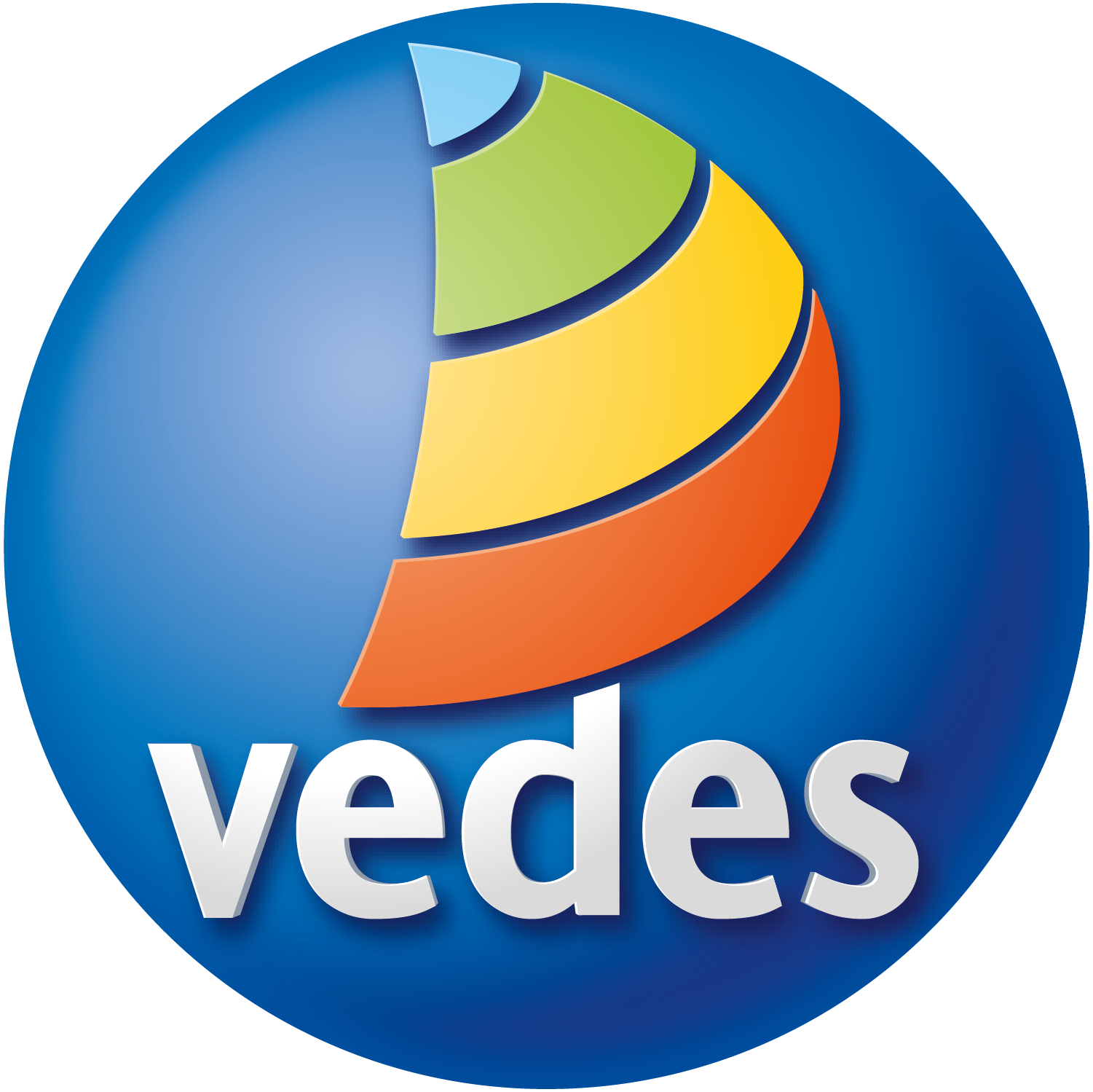
- Founded: March 6, 1904; 121 years ago in Leipzig, Germany

Vedes AG (self-styled VEDES AG) is a specialist trade organization for games and leisure. The purchasing cooperative was founded in 1904 as Vereinigung Deutscher Spielwarenhändler in Leipzig.

The group includes some 1000 retailers in Germany, Austria, Italy, the Netherlands, Luxembourg, Hungary and Switzerland. The head office of the group is located in Nuremberg.

== History ==
=== 20th century ===
The Association of German toy dealers was formed on 6 March 1904 by Georg Langelittig and 13 other founding members in Leipzig as a purchasing cooperative. In 1911 the head office of the purchasing cooperative was relocated to Berlin. In 1920 the company name "Vedes" and the first logo, the "Christmas tree with 3 candles", were created. From 1925, Vedes also sold its products through catalogs. In 1929, the Vedes house was inaugurated as the new headquarters in Nuremberg's Moltkestraße. In 1943 it switched to a building in Blumenstraße because of war damage. When these alternative quarters were also destroyed in 1945, the headquarters moved to Frommannstraße.

In 1948 the then 211 member stores were divided: 134 remained in the West Zone, 62 in the East Zone and 15 in other European countries. In 1950, Vedes was a key co-founder of the Nuremberg Toy Fair. In 1964, a new Vedes house with a thousand square meters of exhibition space was inaugurated on Altenbergerstrasse (today's Sigmundstrasse) in Nuremberg. In 1965 the new logo "Vedes-Schiff" was created and replaced the Christmas tree. Also, the term "Vedes specialty shop for games + leisure" was coined and used. 311 members founded the Toy Ring in 1969.

In 1973 the SF Spiel + Freizeit Handelsbetriebe GmbH was formed, given the task of securing sales areas and maintaining Vedes specialist shops. In 1974, Vedes AG in St. Gallen, Switzerland and Vedes Spiel + Freizeit Handels Ges. mbH in Vienna, Austria were established. This was followed in 1977 by the founding of Vedes-Benelux BV for members in the Benelux. In 1986, another new Vedes logo was introduced with the "Vedes cube" as a symbol for play and leisure, replaced in 2001 by the logo that is still used today, the Vedes ball.

=== 21st century ===
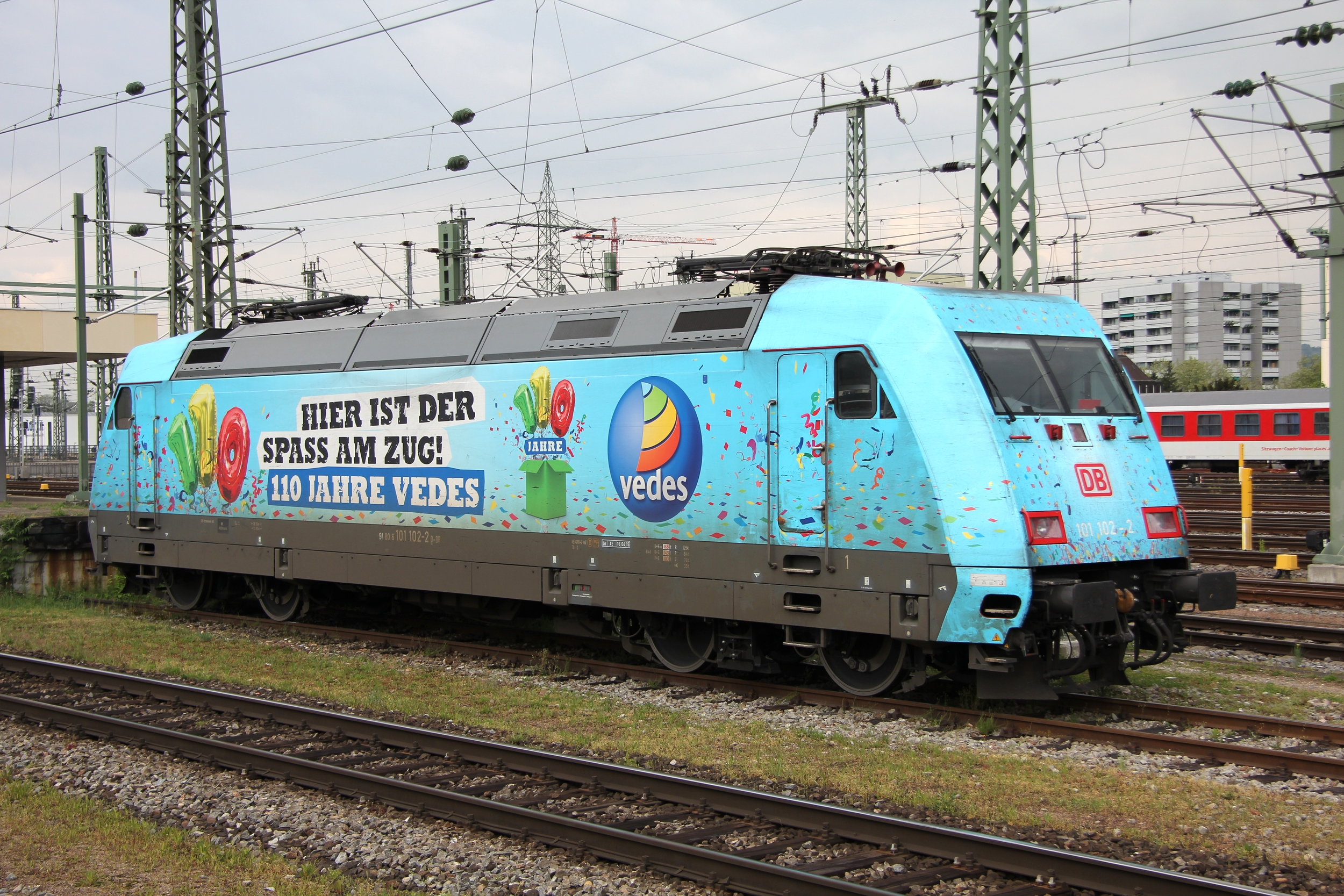
A German train engine, advertising Vedes in 2015

In 2004, the Vedes Group celebrated two anniversaries with "100 Years Vedes" and "35 Years Toy Ring". The headquarters and logistics moved within Nuremberg to the former Grundig site, on which Europe's largest model hall for games and leisure was built. On 1 January 2014, Vedes took over the operative wholesale business of Hoffmann Spielwaren. In January 2015 the closure of the Nuremberg distribution center was announced. The logistics now take place in Lotte, Westphalia, the former headquarters of the Hoffmann company. Up to a hundred jobs were lost as a result of the closure in Nuremberg.
