= Tiny Love =

Toy brand

Tiny Love is a brand of soft developmental toys and developmental activity gyms for infants and children. In 1993, Tiny Love introduced a product called the "Gymini", a portable, collapsible sensory environment for floor playtime for small babies. This is considered their flagship product.

The brand competes well with established rivals such as Fisher-Price, even though Tiny Love markets only around 70 toys and accessories. As of 2004, the Tiny Love brand accounted for about 3 percent of the global market in baby toys, with annual exports of $50–60 million. It held a 25 percent global market share for musical mobiles and activity gyms. The company's revenues were growing by 25 percent a year at that time, with the most dramatic growth in the Far East, particularly in Japan.

== Corporate profile ==
The Tiny Love brand was created by the Shilav Group, Israel's leading baby supply / toy store chain. At the time it was associated with the Maya Group Inc., a privately owned toy supply company headquartered in Garden Grove, CA. In 2014 the brand was acquired by the Canadian company Dorel Industries, under its "Dorel Infants" division which also owns the popular brands Safety 1st, Quinny, and Maxi-Cosi.

The brand is still headquartered at Tiny Love, Ltd., a small company located in Tel Aviv, Israel, where the toys are conceived and developed, and the website is managed. The company has an American subsidiary, "Tiny Love, Inc.", based in New York City. The toys are manufactured in China, and sold through partner retailers all over the world. Half of the sales are in the United States and the rest are in Europe, Japan, South Africa and Australia.

== Product development ==
Toy development at Tiny Love is guided by scientific principles of child development. The Tiny Love team includes psychologists, child development experts, quality assurance specialists, parent groups and babies themselves. These contributors participate at every stage of product development. Toys are developed beginning with the premise that "babies are intelligent, creative, and unbiased human beings with spontaneous and individual reactions." Research for new toy development includes:

- An understanding of babies' unique perspective on the world
- Long-term observation of babies in play situations
- Studies and observations of babies' responses to various stimuli and environments
- Professional knowledge of psychological and physiological theories on infancy
- Parent focus groups
- Analysis of market needs and trends

== Recall of wind chime toys ==
On February 10, 2010, the U.S. Consumer Product Safety Commission and Health Canada, in cooperation with the firm, initiated a voluntary recall of Tiny Love's wind chime toys, some of which are included in the company's popular "Gymini" product. The company had received five reports of babies pulling apart the wind chimes, exposing sharp metal rods. There was one report of a minor injury to a 24-month-old baby who punctured his cheek with the rods. About 800,000 of the toys were sold in the U.S. and Canada. The toys were made in China, at a factory that Tiny Love has since ceased working with.
