= RC2 Corporation =

- Industry: Die-cast toys and scale models
- Founded: 1992, U.S.
- Headquarters: Oak Brook, Illinois, U.S.
- Owner: Tomy

The RC2 Corporation, a division of Japan-based firm Takara Tomy, is a toy design, marketing, and distribution company headquartered in Oak Brook, Illinois, United States. The company was founded in 1992.

== Overview ==
RC2 markets brands such as The First Years and Lamaze. Its Learning Curve Brands subsidiary is dedicated to infant and preschool merchandise.

The company went public in 1997. In 2005, they signed a deal with Marathon Media to produce a line of Totally Spies! dolls. By 2006, 91.8 percent of RC2's products were made in China. In 2007, the company made headlines after it was forced to recall 1.5 million Thomas & Friends wooden toy trains after they were found to contain excessive amounts of lead. The toys involved in the recall had been manufactured in China.

RC2 was acquired by Takara Tomy in 2011.
