= Plarail =

Japanese plastic toy train

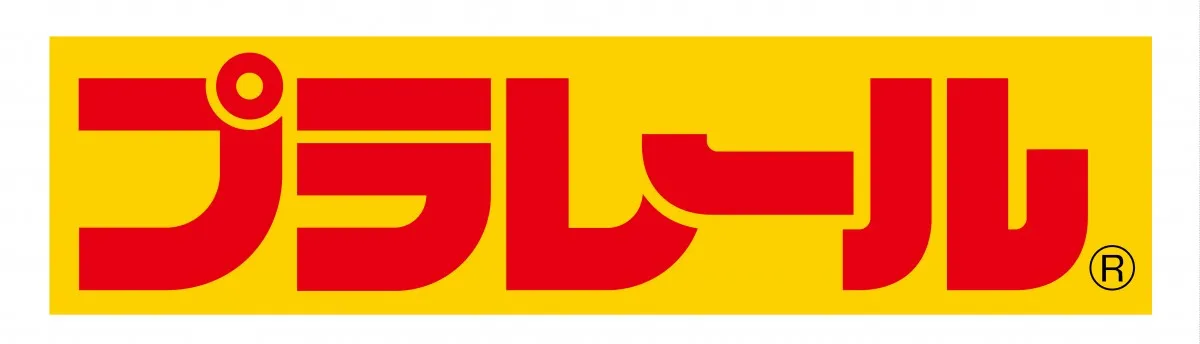
- Logo used in Japan
- Product type: Toy train
- Current owner: Takara Tomy
- Introduced: 1959

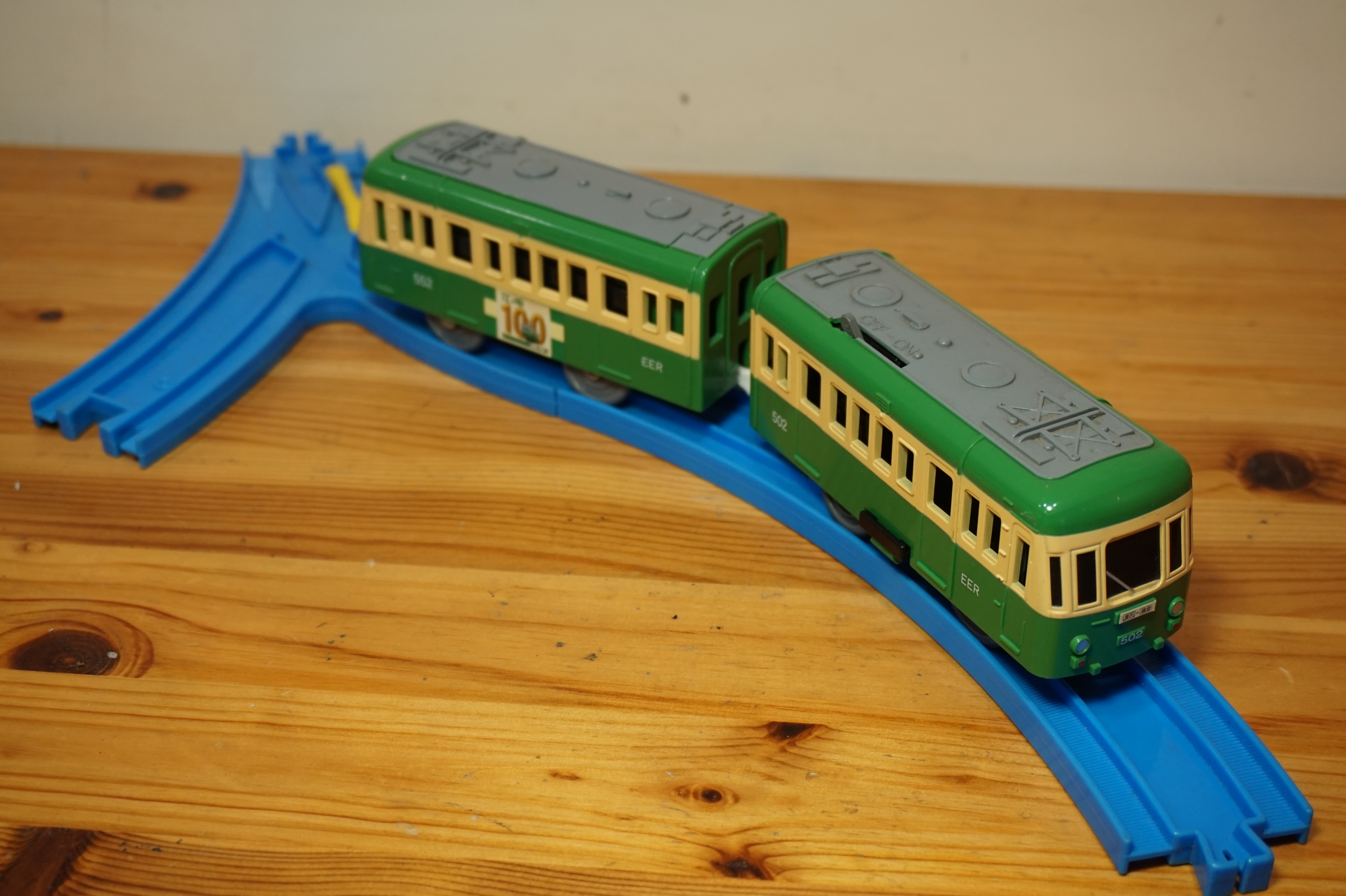
Plarail toy

Plarail (プラレール, Purarēru) is a toy train and plastic track system made by Tomy and introduced in Japan in 1959. It was expanded into a battery-operated electric toy train system in October 1961. Plarail is not compatible with most other brands of model railway, although as it has a similar rail gauge to the wooden toy train systems, rolling stock may run on both systems to some degree.

== History ==
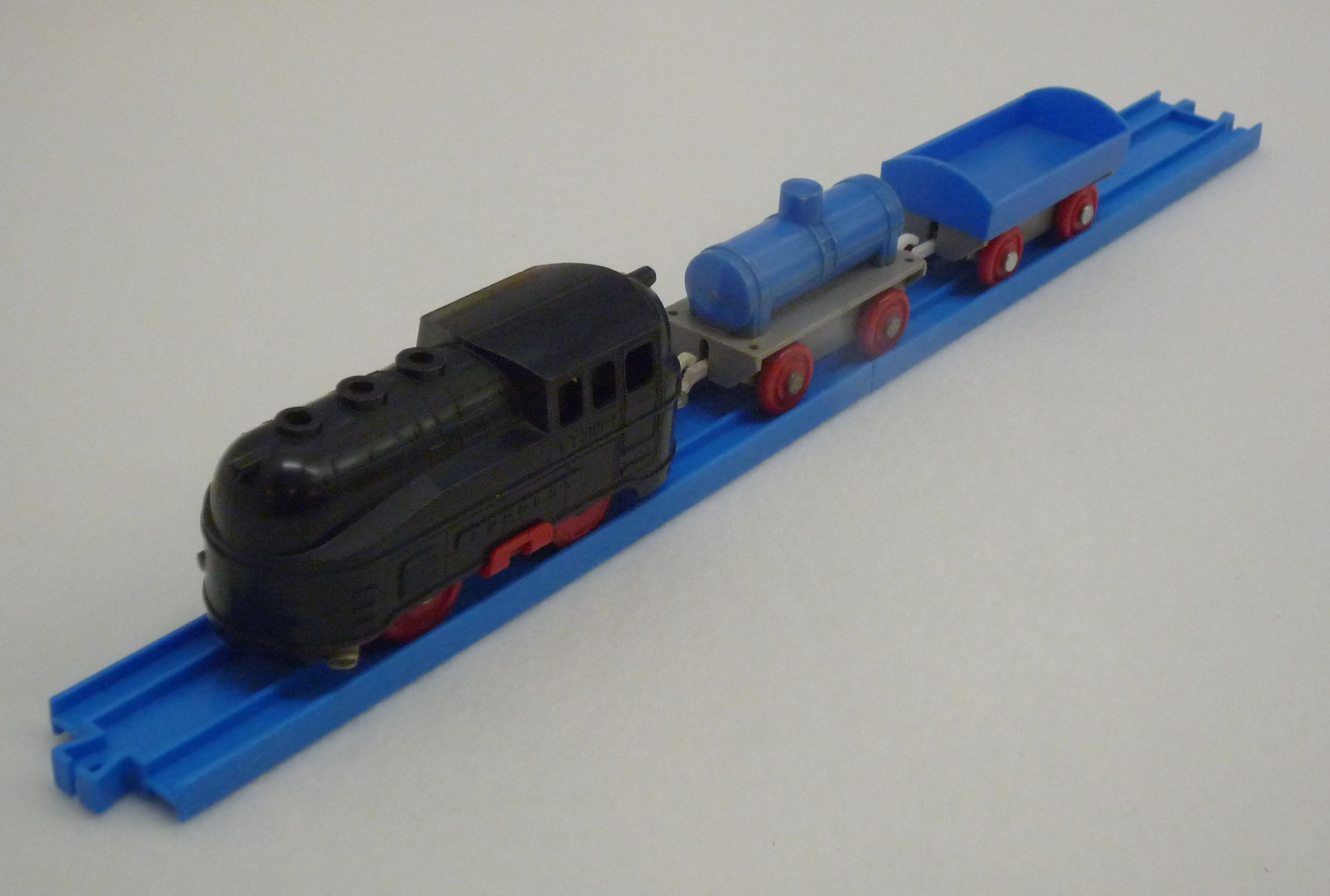
The first electric Plarail train from the 'Electric Pla-Train Set'.

In 1959, the Plarail system launched in Japan with three hand-powered trains. The first train set released was titled 'Plastic Railroad Set', which featured a plastic steam locomotive and three freight cars to be moved by hand, and a figure 8 of light blue plastic railway track. In October 1961, the range was expanded into a battery-operated electric toy train system where the trains were fitted with miniature motors. The first set featuring this was the 'Electric Pla-Train Set', which included a three-car configuration of a locomotive and two cars. The three-car configuration has been frequently used since, particularly for later releases based on real life passenger trains. In 1971, after previously releasing generic trains, the first Plarail model to be based on a real life train was released, the D51 Kisha. Since then, there have been hundreds of Plarail trains and rolling stock based on real life Japanese trains. In 1972, the Plarail brand was becoming more known and production of track and scenery pieces greatly increased.

March 1992 saw the introduction of a product line based on the Thomas & Friends television series. The line features characters, buildings and sets based on the series, and has continued to be a popular sub-series of the Plarail system. This particular range would be spun-off by HiT Toys and later Fisher-Price as the TrackMaster range in the 21st century, using similar elements but using different manufacturing techniques.

In 1997, sharing the anniversary of the first train running in Japan, October 14 was officially designated in Japan as "Plarail Day", where a commemorative limited edition item is released each year. In 1999, the 40th Anniversary of the Plarail system was celebrated with the release of a tinplate version of the C53-43 locomotive and carriage, as well as a re-release of the 'Plastic Railroad Set' with a battery-powered version of the original locomotive.

In 2008, the Hyper Guardian Series was launched. In 2009, the 50th Anniversary of the Plarail system was celebrated. A new version of the original 'Plastic Railroad Set' was released titled the 'C12 Steam Train Arch Bridge and Rail Set', and the first official Plarail Shop opened at Tokyo Station.

In 2011, three new series were released to offer variety. Plarail Advance is a range of smaller trains that fit on one rail of standard Plarail track, Te-cology Plarail is a range of push along trains that light up without batteries required, and Big Plarail is a range of large trains that include a microphone to record and playback sounds.

In Summer 2012, the Plarail Chuggington range was released, based on the television series and was retired in late 2016.

In 2014, a series with the Disney franchise was introduced as the Disney Dream Railway was also retired in late 2019.

Beginning in 2015, the Plarail range would introduce the long-running Shinkansen Henkei Robo Shinkalion franchise, which featured Plarail-compatible trains that transformed into giant robots.

== International ==
In 1987, a range titled Tomy Trains was released in the UK and (excluding Asia) exported worldwide. The range used elements from the Plarail range, including the same track system produced in dark blue. The trains were larger than the Plarail trains, and featured magnetic couplings, forward and reverse switches, and driver figures for the cab.

In 1998, the Tomy Trains range was discontinued in the UK and replaced with the Plarail system, renamed as Tomica World. The system featured some European based trains, but overall featured existing products from the Plarail system, including the Thomas & Friends series. In 2003, due to the popularity of the Thomas series, the range was renamed Thomas Motor Road and Rail and focused only on Thomas & Friends themed products.

In 2007, HIT Entertainment's subsidiary HIT Toy Company picked up the license to produce the USA range, which was renamed to 'Thomas TrackMaster'. The range featured similar engines and rolling stock on a new realistically designed brown track system. Track adapters were sold with sets to connect the TrackMaster track to the original blue track, thus making every system compatible. In 2008, Tomy bought the license for the TrackMaster range to be distributed in the UK, and all the Motor Road and Rail engines' packaging were re-skinned to new TrackMaster themed packaging (minus Bill and Ben). In 2009, the Thomas license was bought by Mattel's Fisher-Price, and since late 2009, the new TrackMaster system is now distributed by Mattel worldwide, apart from Asia. The adapters have since not been sold with sets. As Takara Tomy's license was different from its UK and USA branches, the Plarail Thomas range was not affected by these changes.

In 2010, the Plarail system was released again, alongside the Tomica die-cast system, outside of Asia and merged as Tomica. The system featured products from the Hyper Guardian series and the Tomica die-cast range. The range discontinued in 2013.

== Related products and services ==
=== Plarail Lifestyle ===
Plarail Lifestyle is a range of themed products with illustrations of the Plarail range including apparel, stationery, activity books, and candy.

=== Expos ===
Plarail Expos are held yearly around Japan showcasing the range of products available. 1.7 million people have attended events over its first ten years of operating. A yearly exclusive passenger carriage can be obtained for free upon visiting.

=== Official stores ===
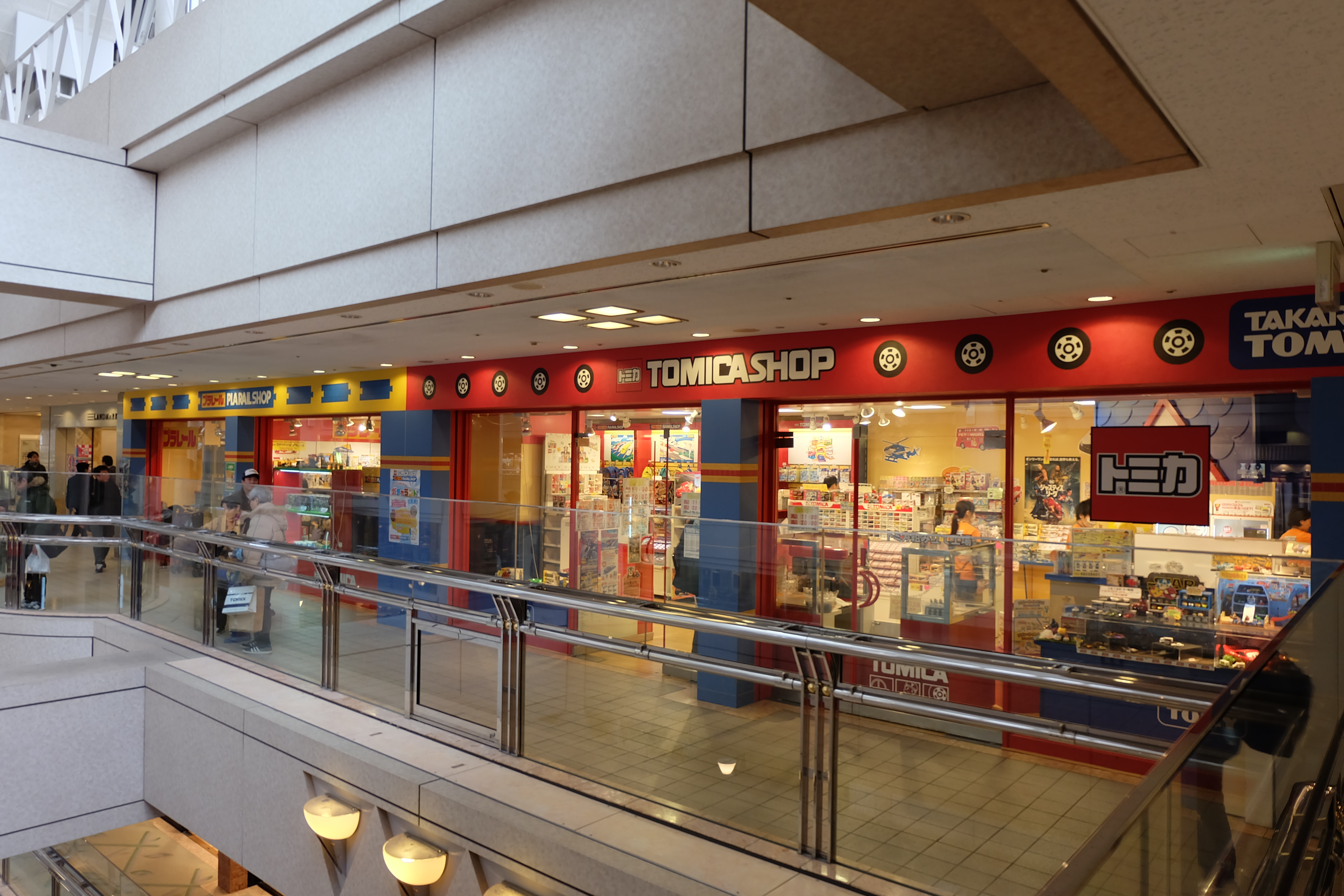
A Plarail Shop at Yokohama, 2018

In 2009, the first Plarail Shop was opened at Tokyo Station, along with the Tomica Shop. Apart from toys, the store also sells products from the Plarail Lifestyle range. Like expos, an exclusive passenger can be bought, as well as many other exclusive trains and sets.

=== Promotional DVDs ===
Various promotional DVDs are available at Plarail Expos and stores. These include a yearly released DVD featuring new products for the year and advertising reels from all Plarail and Tomica ranges, and DVDs that focus on particular smaller series.

=== Video games ===
In 1995, a computer simulator software titled Digital Plarail was released for Windows 3.1/95, which allowed virtual layouts to be built and played with using Plarail products. Expansion packs covering different areas were later released. Games on consoles have also been made, such as "Densha Daisuki: Plarail de Ippai", published by Tomy in 1998 for the original PlayStation, "Kids Station: Plarail Tetsudō Monoshiri Hyakka", published by Atlus Co. in 2002 also for PlayStation and "Plarail: Yume ga Ippai!" released in 2002 by Tomy for PlayStation 2.

== In popular culture ==
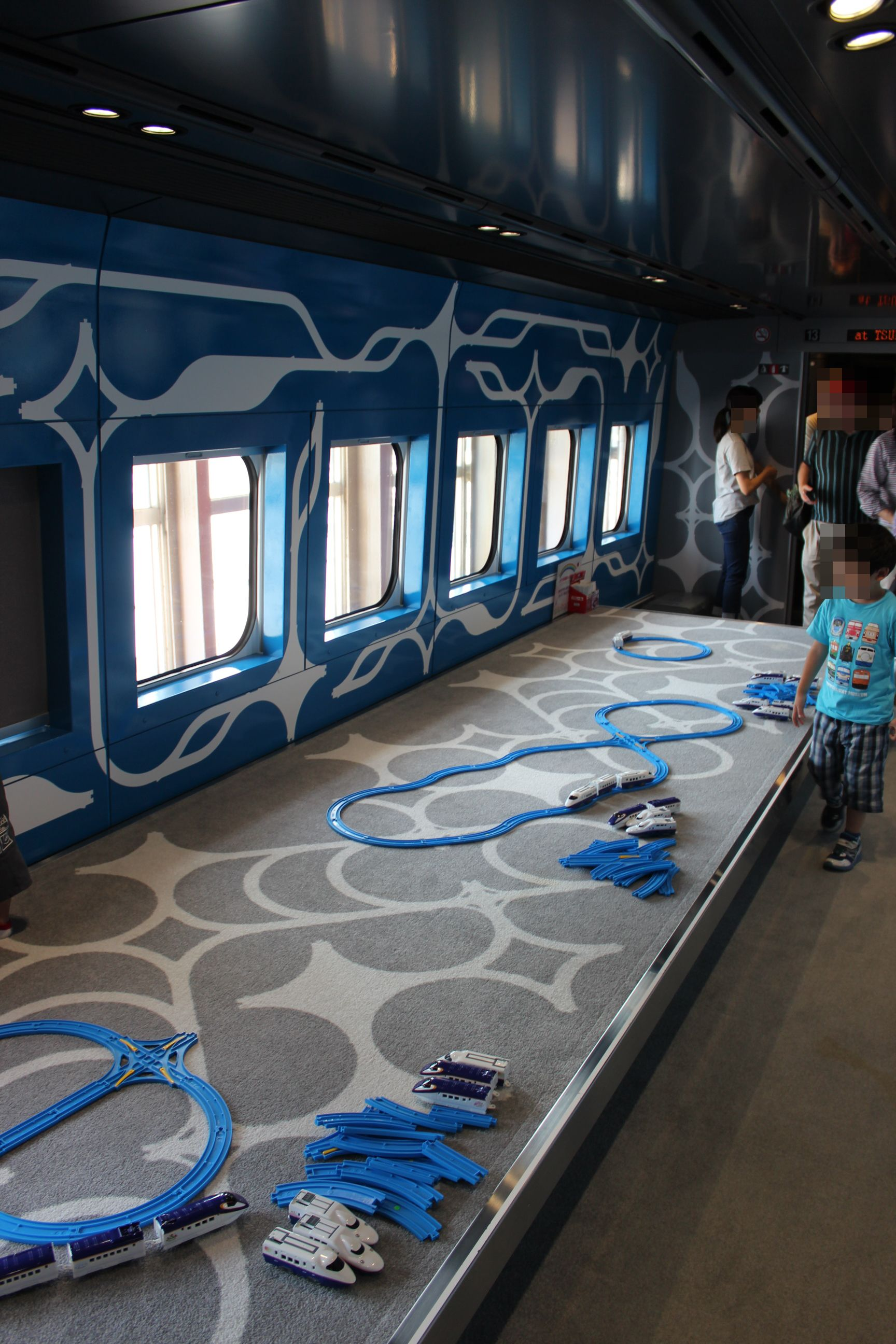
The children's play area in car 13 designed by Art Unit Paramodel

The Art Unit Paramodel is a group of artists run by Yasuhiko Hayashi and Yusuke Nakano since 2001, that utilize Plarail tracks among other things for their works of art and installations. They designed the childrens play section in car 13 of the Genbi Shinkansen. A E3 Series Shinkansen excursion trainset in service from 2016 to 2020, featuring several artists that each designed parts of the train.
