= TootsieToy =

Manufacturer of die cast toy vehicles

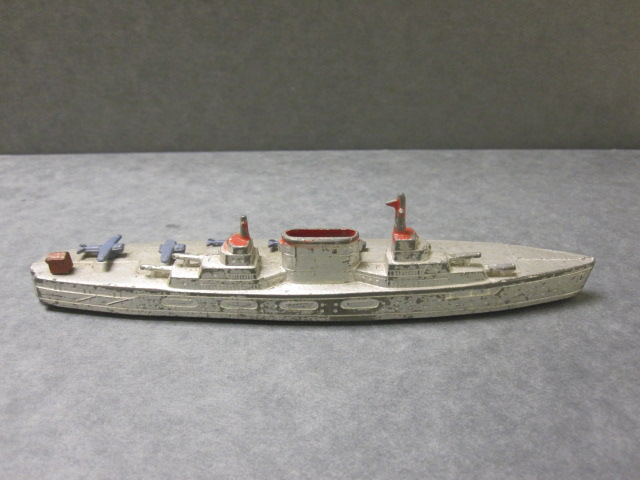
Tootsietoy ship.

Tootsietoy is a manufacturer of die cast toy cars and other toy vehicles which was originally based in Chicago, Illinois. Though the Tootsietoy name has been used since the 1920s, the company's origins date from about 1890. An enduring marque, toys with the Tootsietoy name were consistently popular from the 1930s through the 1990s.

== Diecasting origins ==
Tootsietoy had its beginnings in the two diecasting companies of the Dowst and the Shure Brothers who were established near the same time in the 1890s. The Dowst brothers originally established a trade paper called the National Laundry Journal and later purchased a linotype machine to cast metal buttons and cuff links related to the laundry business.

Meanwhile, the Tootsietoy brand also had origins in a range of miniature cars in the form of charms, pins, cuff links and the like, introduced circa 1901 by the Chicago based Cosmo Company owned by the Shure Bros. which bought Dowst in 1926. The name, however, remained Dowst Manufacturing Co. The first actual model car from the company was produced between 1909 and 1911. One was a closed limousine which was followed by a 1915 Ford Model T open tourer.

== Pre-War toys ==
By the early 1920s the name 'tootsie' was being used as a brand name and "Tootsietoy" was registered as a trade mark in 1924. The 'Tootsie' moniker apparently came from one of the Dowst Brothers' granddaughters, whose name was "Toots". Tootsietoy made metal prizes for Cracker Jack boxes, and this success in the 1930s may also have led to Dowst providing cast pieces for the game Monopoly. The company also produced a large assortment of die-cast dollhouse furniture.

In the 1920s trains, cars, trucks, military vehicles, aircraft, pistols and a variety of other toys were manufactured by Dowst. Vehicles often had white rubber tires which over time become brittle and often have not survived play-wear and time. One of the unique offerings were a set of 1932 Graham diecast cars - Tootsietoy offered a Graham sedan, town car, coupe, roadster, dual cowl convertible, delivery panel truck and tow truck. A marque not often seen in miniature since, Graham was a household name at Tootsietoy. The Tootsietoy Grahams were available in boxes with "Graham" on the sides - indicating that they may have been used as promotional models for the Graham company. If so, these would have been just about the earliest promotional automobile toys seen anywhere.

One car that definitely was a promotional model was the 1935 Lasalle made for General Motors that came in sedan and coupe versions packaged in a special smallish blue and dark rose box. Another interesting model was the 1936 Lincoln Zephyr which was available in a gift set with a 'Roamer' camper trailer. World War II work later had the Dowst Co. making detonators for grenades and mines as well as belt and parachute buckles. As would be expected, little toy production was seen during wartime production, though some paper toys were made.

== Toy construction ==
Whether small or large, metal or plastic, Tootsietoys were usually simply made - often with only seven parts: a single diecast metal body, two axles, and four wheels. Arms protruding from the underside of the body were pinched around the axles after the wheels were added, which held wheels and axles in place. Many Tootsietoy cars are still made in this basic manner, though in the 1970s and 1980s, plastic interiors and other parts were also added.

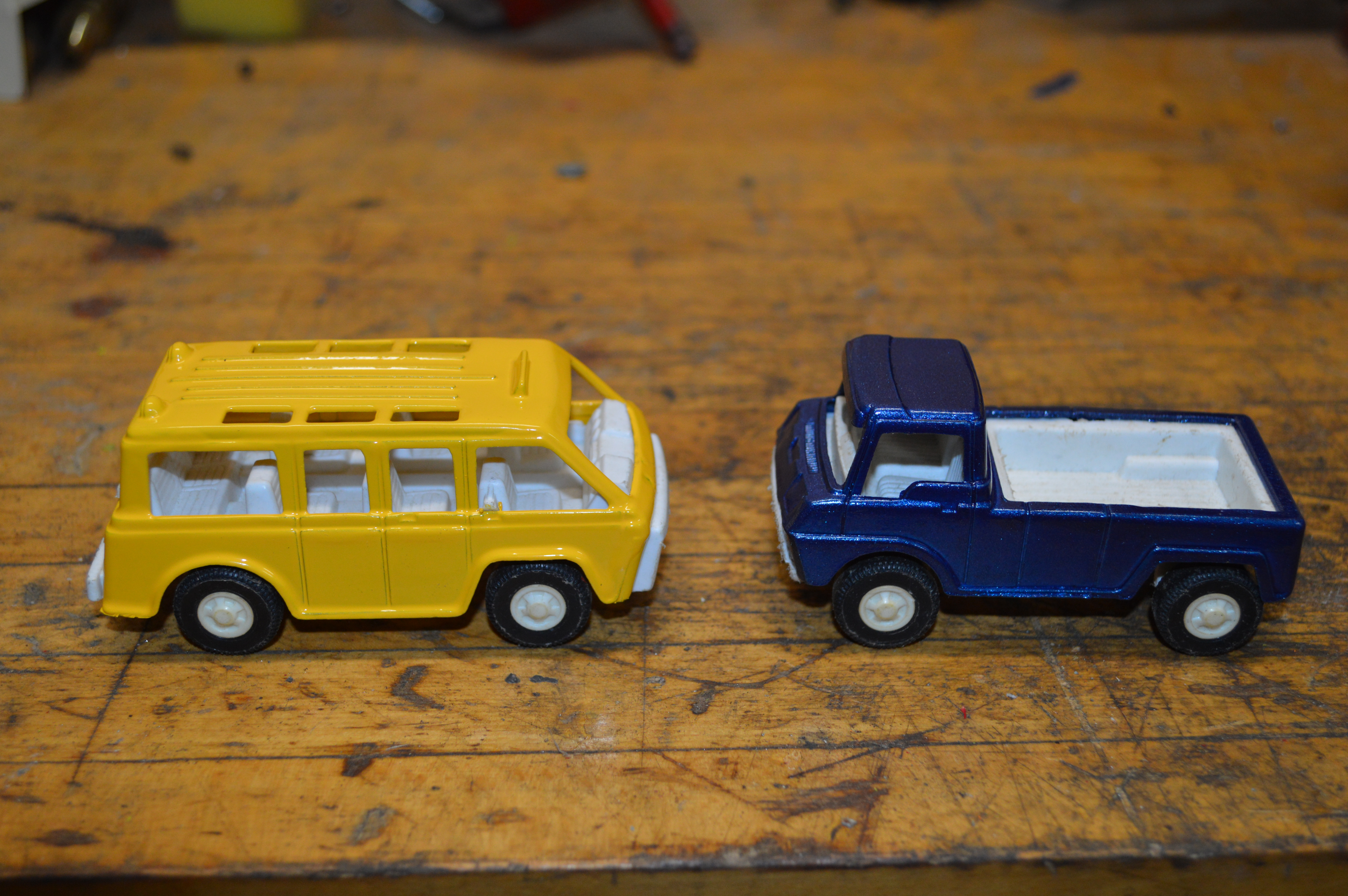
late 70's 3.5" Tootsietoy

One exception to this simplistic construction was the 1955 Pontiac Safari two-door station wagon which was heavily diecast in about 1:28 scale, larger than much of the Tootsietoy fare. On this model, the diecast body was not as simple as on most of the companies offerings but also had diecast seats, an accurately shaped dashboard and a plastic steering wheel. The rear tailgate opened and the car also had a heavy separately diecast chassis. The usual fare in the 1960s were American offerings like a 1959 Oldsmobile convertible, a 1959 Ford Wagon, or a 1960 Chrysler convertible. Vehicles were made in many sizes but 5", 3.5" and even smaller were all produced. As time passed the larger sizes generally faded, but in the 1970s the 1 dollar, 10 car "JamPac" of tiny, simple diecast cars about 2 inches long became known as the world's best child "shutter-upper". A couple of these smaller cars are still in demand, like a replica of the Chevrolet Corvette-powered Cheetah (a real-world competitor with Shelby's AC Cobra). This car, though simple and tiny, was not commonly seen in miniature elsewhere.

== Later business ==
In 1961, Strombeck-Becker, later abbreviated to 'Strombecker' was a hobby company purchased by Dowst / Tootsietoy. Strombecker had previously made popular plastic models mainly for slot-car racing — and continued to do so, but by the end of the 1960s the slot-car niche had largely run its course. Later, plastic as well as die-cast toys were identified with both names as "Tootsietoy-Strombecker". The name Tootsietoy was often applied to larger, but fairly realistic plastic cars and trucks through the 1990s, but some die-cast were also still made like the Hardbody series in Matchbox size and slightly larger than 1:43 scale.

By the late 1960s, Tootsietoys were made in both the United States and Hong Kong. Though most Tootsie toys are produced in Asia today, they were traditionally produced in Chicago, and were also made in a few other American factories such as Rockford, Illinois. Tootsietoy, however, should not be confused with the similar brand Midgetoy, which was also based in Rockford.

Tootsietoy, which is now owned by J. Lloyd International, Inc., is still based in Chicago and makes about 40 million cars per year.
