= List of scale-model industry people =

This list contains the names of significant contributors to the history and development of the scale-model and model-kit industry, including engineers, artists, designers, draftsmen, tool-makers, executives, historians and promoters.

This list does not include people primarily notable for the competitive operation of a scale-model vehicle, unless they have a notable career as designers or executives or outside of the hobby industry such as car designers.

== A ==
- Steve Adams: founder of Adams Models
- Harold Alden: early aircraft modeler and industry promoter
- John Allen: influential model railroader
- John Amendola: kit-box artist
- Mel Anderson: gas engine designer (for flying scale aircraft)
- John Andrews: artist, kit designer and marketer for Hawk
- Ray Arden: inventor of the Glo-Plug
- William Atwood: engine designer (for flying scale aircraft)

== B ==
- Charlie Bauer: flying aircraft kit designer
- Adrien Bertin: R/C car glowplug engine designer
- Edward Beshar: early model designer and builder
- Jack Besser: co-founder of Monogram Models
- Maxwell Basset: gas-powered model pioneer
- Pieter Bervoets: co-founder of Serpent
- Dick Branstner: co-founder of MPC, kit designer, creator of the 'Color Me Gone' dragsters
- William Brown IV: created first successful gas engine for mass-marketed flying aircraft

== C ==
- Bill Campbell: illustrator, kit-box art designer/painter; creator of the Weird-Ohs and Silly Surfers series for Hawk
- Tom Carter: industry executive
- Bill Coulter: writer; builder; kit-developer
- James "Jim" Petit Cox (1910-1993): illustrator, kit-box art designer/painter. Notably associated with Aurora
- John Cuomo (1901-1971): first salesman for Aurora
- Bill Cushenbery: custom kit designer, notably associated with AMT
- Roger Curtis: Co-founder of Associated Electrics and R/C car designer (RC10, RC12)

== D ==
- Tom Daniel: kit-designer of custom and caricature subjects for Monogram Models

== E ==
- Billy Easton: R/C car designer for Serpent (and previously Team Durango)
- Scott Eidson: kit-box artist
- Fred Ertl, Sr.: founder of the Ertl Company

== F ==
- Jacque Fresco (1916–): co-founder of Revell

== G ==
- Leonardo Garofali: co-founder of SG Racing Cars and Blitz Model Technica
- Jaures Garofali: founder of Super Tigre Saturno micromecanica
- West Gallogly: founder of AMT
- Lorenzo Ghiglieri: kit-box artist
- Joseph E. Giammarino (1916–1992): co-founder of Aurora Plastics Corporation
- "Dirty Donny" Gillies: kit-box artist
- Lewis H. Glaser (1917-1972): co-founder of Revell
- Walt Good: considered "the father of remote-control aircraft modeling"
- Carl Goldberg: model aircraft designer and industry executive
- Kevin Gowland, John Gowland and Jack Gowland: co-founders of Gowland and Gowland; the company's Highway Pioneers line of early car model kits was marketed by Revell in the early '50s, and was instrumental in the early growth of the scale model hobby in the US.
- Paul K. Guillows: founder of GHQ Model Airplane Company (later known as Guillows)
- Valeriy Grygorenko († 2022): kit-box artist (mainly) for Roden

== H ==
- Scott T. Hards: entrepreneur, founder of Hobby Link Japan
- John Hanley: tool and die maker; founder of Jo-Han
- Suguro Hasegawa: founder of Hasegawa Corporation
- Roger Harney: industry executive
- Don Holthaus: founder of Modelhaus
- Cherry Hill: model engineer
- Juraj Hudy: founder of XRAY and Hudy
- Gene Husting (1927-2014): executive of Associated Electrics

== I ==
- Takashi Ishii, founder/owner of Studio 27/Gilles Company

== J ==
- Dean Jeffries: kit designer, auto customizer, notably associated with MPC
- Bob Johnson: industry executive

== K ==
- Al Kalmbach: founder of Model Railroader magazine and Kalmbach Publishing, early industry promoter
- Yuichi Kanai: radio-controlled car designer, significantly for Kyosho (Inferno)
- Shigeru Kawada: radio-controlled car designer and founder-owner of Kawada Model
- Jim Keeler: industry executive
- Levon Kemalyan (1907–1976): manufacturer, founder of Kemtron
- Richard ("Dick") Kishady: kit-box artist and first art director of Revell
- Akira Kogawa: radio-controlled car designer, significantly for Kyosho (Optima, Scorpion) and Hobby Products International (Baja 5B and 5T)
- Shigeru Komatsuzaki: science-fiction illustrator; kit-box artist
- Jo Kotula: aviation illustrator; kit-box artist
- Dick Korda: award-winning model airplane designer and flyer
- Nicholas Kove (1891-1958): founder of Airfix
- Oscar Koveleski: CanAm racing pioneer; founder of Auto World; promoter of slot car racing, model building, and RC racing and building
- Mort Künstler: kit-box artist, notably associated with Aurora in the 1960s.

== L ==
- Jürgen Lautenbach: founder of LRP Electronic
- Cliff Lett: R/C car designer and president of Associated Electrics
- William M. "Bill" Lester (1908-2005): founder of Pyro Plastics Corporation, pioneer in the development of injection molding
- Jack Leynnwood: kit-box artist
- Paul Lindberg: founder of Lindberg Products, Inc.
- William, Walter and Arthur Lines: co-founders of Frog
- Dick Locher: kit-box artist
- Ted Longshaw (1926-2011): hobby shop owner and founder of BRCA, EFRA and IFMAR
- Gil Losi: founder of Losi, former owner of Ranch Pit Shop

== M ==
- Joe Mansour: co-founder of Frog
- Tom Marshall: founder of Buggleskelly Station
- Dick Mates Sr. and Phil Mates (brothers): co-founders of Hawk Model Company
- Dick Mates Jr.: executive at Hawk
- Bob McCleod: industry executive
- Fred Megow: founder of Megow Models (Philadelphia, 1920s)
- Tom Morgan: kit-box artist, most notably associated with Hawk in the 1960s, as well as Monogram
- John Mueller: directed product and mold design and technical illustration groups for AMT

== N ==
- Philippe Neidhart: founder of Team Orion, CEO of Neidhart SA
- Kody Numedahl: radio-controlled car designer for Team Associated

== O ==
- Jack Odell: co-founder of Lesney Products and founder of Lledo
- Irwin G. Ohlsson: gas engine designer and manufacturer (flying model aircraft)

== P ==
- Keith Plested: founder of PB Racing and co-founder of BRCA
- Irwin S. Polk and Nathan J. Polk: owners of Polk Hobbies; promoters of the scale model hobby
- Ernest Provetti: founder of Trinity Products
- Tarquinio Provini: founder of Protar

== Q ==
- Joseph Quagraine: designer/founder of JQ Products

== R ==
- Bob Reder: co-founder of Monogram Models
- Philip Reed: model ship maker
- Mike Reedy (1941 - 2011): founder of Reedy and creator of Reedy International Race of Champions
- F. Lee Renaud (-1983): founder of Airtronics
- Guillermo Rojas Bazan: aviation model maker
- Bob Rule (businessman), founder of BoLink

== S ==
- Franco Sabatini: designer and co-founder of SG Racing Cars
- Michael Salven: executive of Serpent, designer (Impact, Vector)
- Koji Sanada: R/C car designer, president and CEO of Mugen Seiki, formerly of Aoyagi Metals Company
- Pierre Scerri: model engineer
- Gary Schmidt: industry executive
- Cyril Schumacher: founder of Schumacher Racing Products
- Leon Shulman: aircraft kit designer
- Abe Shikes (1908–1997): co-founder of Aurora Plastics Corporation
- George Siposs (1931-1995): radio controlled car racing pioneer and founder of ROAR
- Victor Stanzel: flying aircraft model designer
- James Hay Stevens (1913 -1973): aircraft kit designer, notably associated with Airfix
- John Steel: kit-box artist
- Henry Struck: aircraft kit designer
- Hisashi Suzuki (1936-2010): radio controlled car racing pioneer (in Japan), founder of Kyosho and JMRCA
- Masayuki Suzuki: former president of Kyosho

== T ==
- Fumito Taki: radio-controlled car designer, significantly for Tamiya (famous works: Sand Scorcher)
- Yoshio Tamiya (1905 - 1988): founder of Tamiya
- Masayuki Tamiya (c1957/1958 - 2017): president of Tamiya
- Shunsaku Tamiya: chairman of Tamiya
- Nils F. Testor: founder of Testors
- George A. Toteff Jr. (1925-2011): founder of MPC, inventor of the AMT 3-in-1 kit; innovator of one-piece body car-model tooling.
- Ron Ton co-founder of Serpent rc cars inventor of the two speed gearbox and the centax clutch for model cars

== U ==
- Yukijiro Umino: designer for Yokomo (Yokomo MR4TC BDx)

== V ==
- Dave Vander Wal: industry executive
- Gordon Varney: founder of Varney Scale Models, developer of early injection molded plastic kits
- Norm Veber: industry executive
- Peter Vetri: Founder and President of Atlantis Toy and Hobby and Current President of the HMA (Hobby Manufacturers Association)

== W ==
- Jim Walker: inventor of U-Control Line Flying (scale aircraft)
- Philip Warren: model ship maker
- Jairus Watson: graphic designer, automotive conceptual artist, kit-box illustrator.
- Dick Wellman: kit-box artist
- Patrick Wentzel: Co-Founder of Carousel Modelers and Miniatures Association
- Tom West: industry executive
- Linn H. Westcott: long-time editor of Model Railroader, hobby industry promoter
- Charles Wilmot: co-founder of Frog
- John Wilmot: co-founder of Frog, pioneer of plastic scale kit models
- Gerald Wingrove: model engineer

== Y ==
- Tomoaki "Tom" Yokobori: founder of Yokomo and Yatabe Arena
