= 1:64 scale =

Scale model size standard

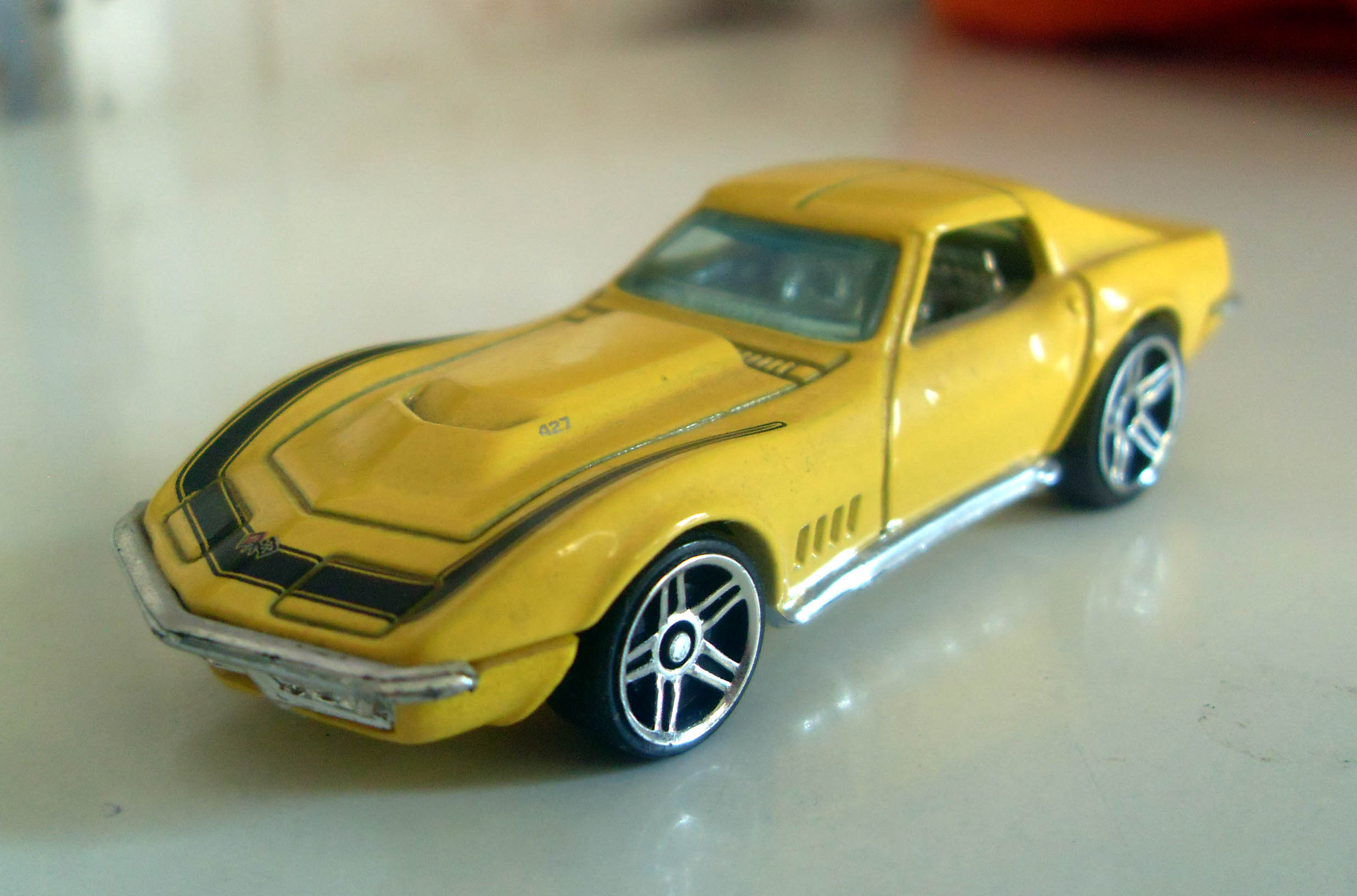
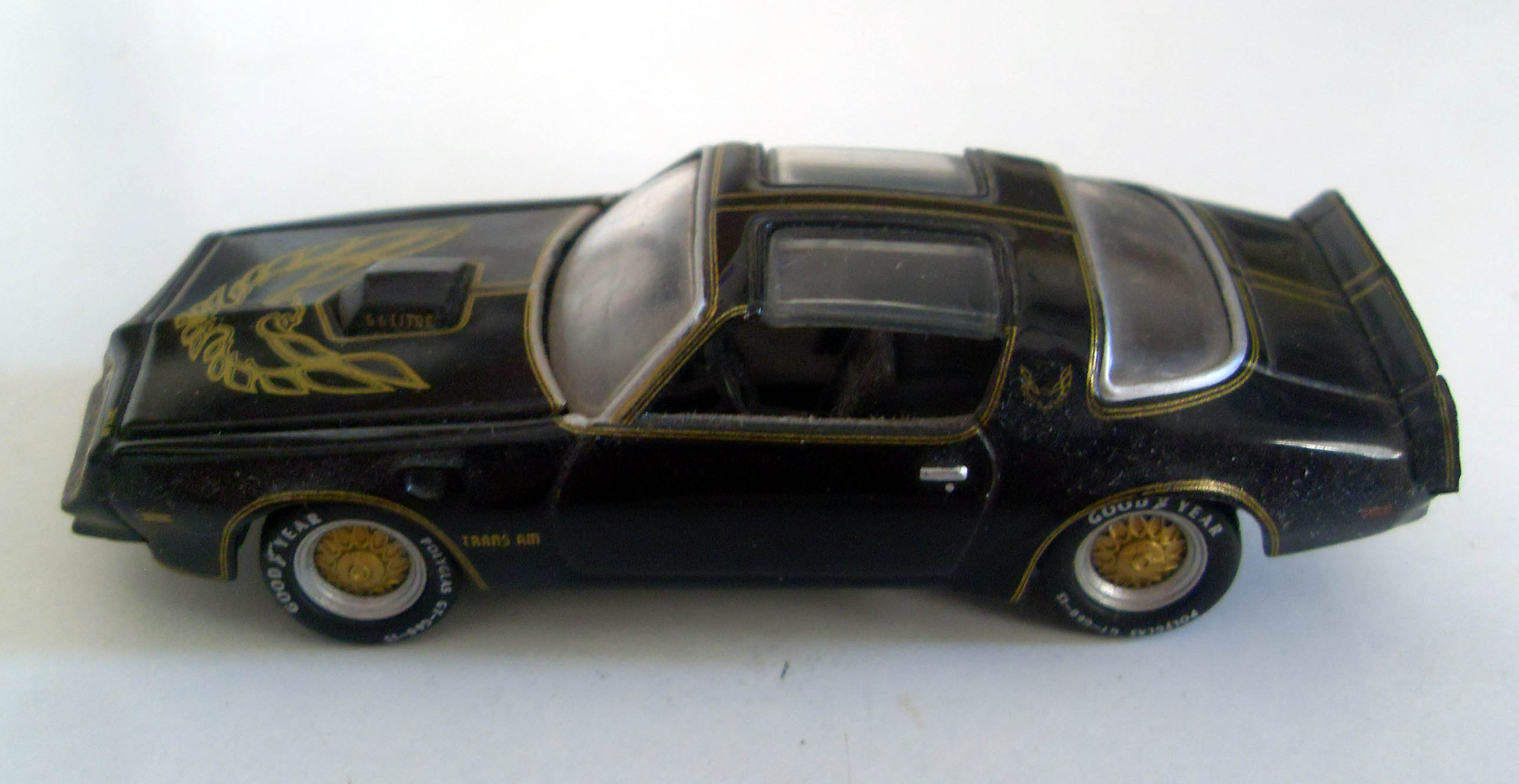
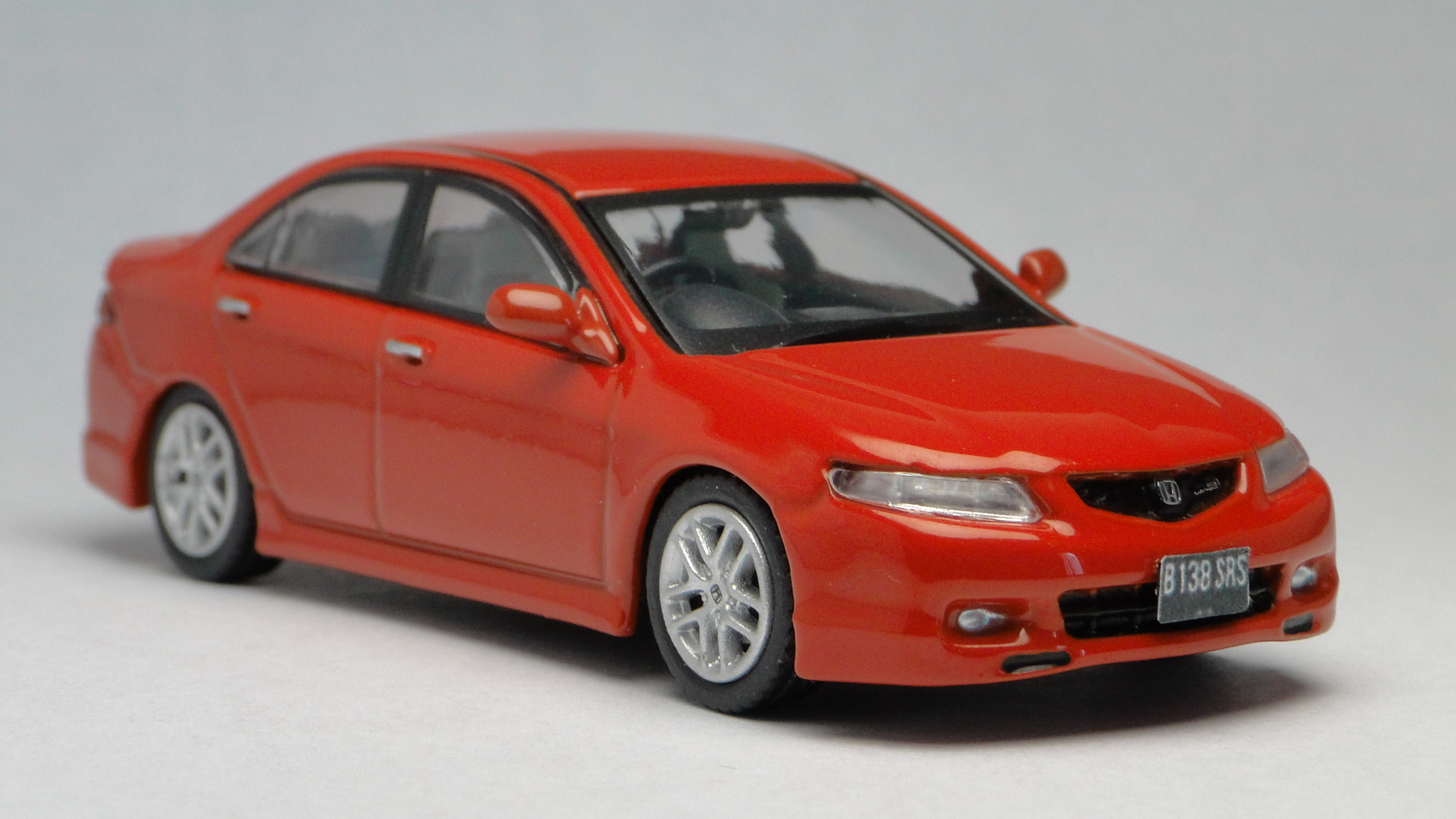
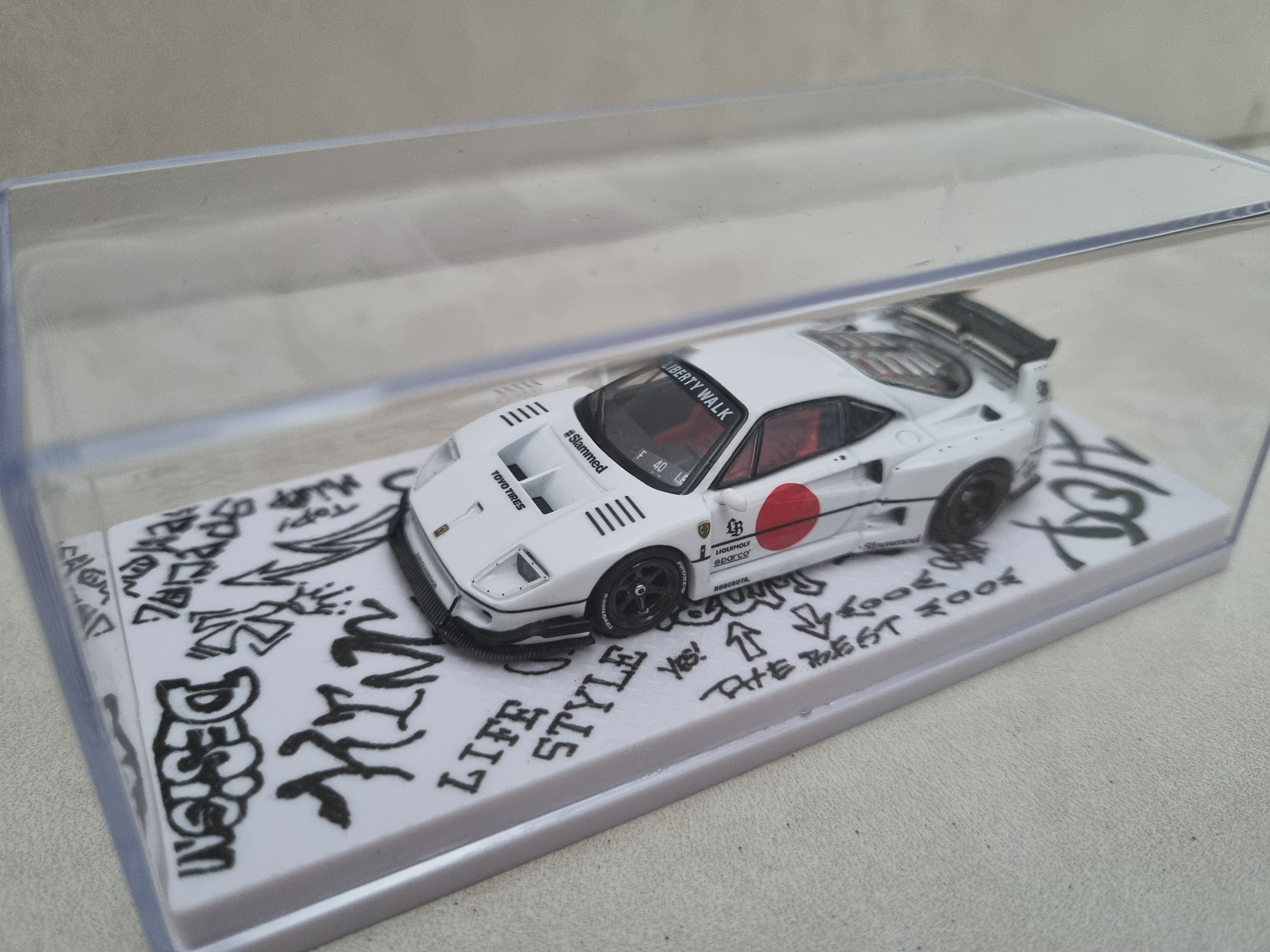
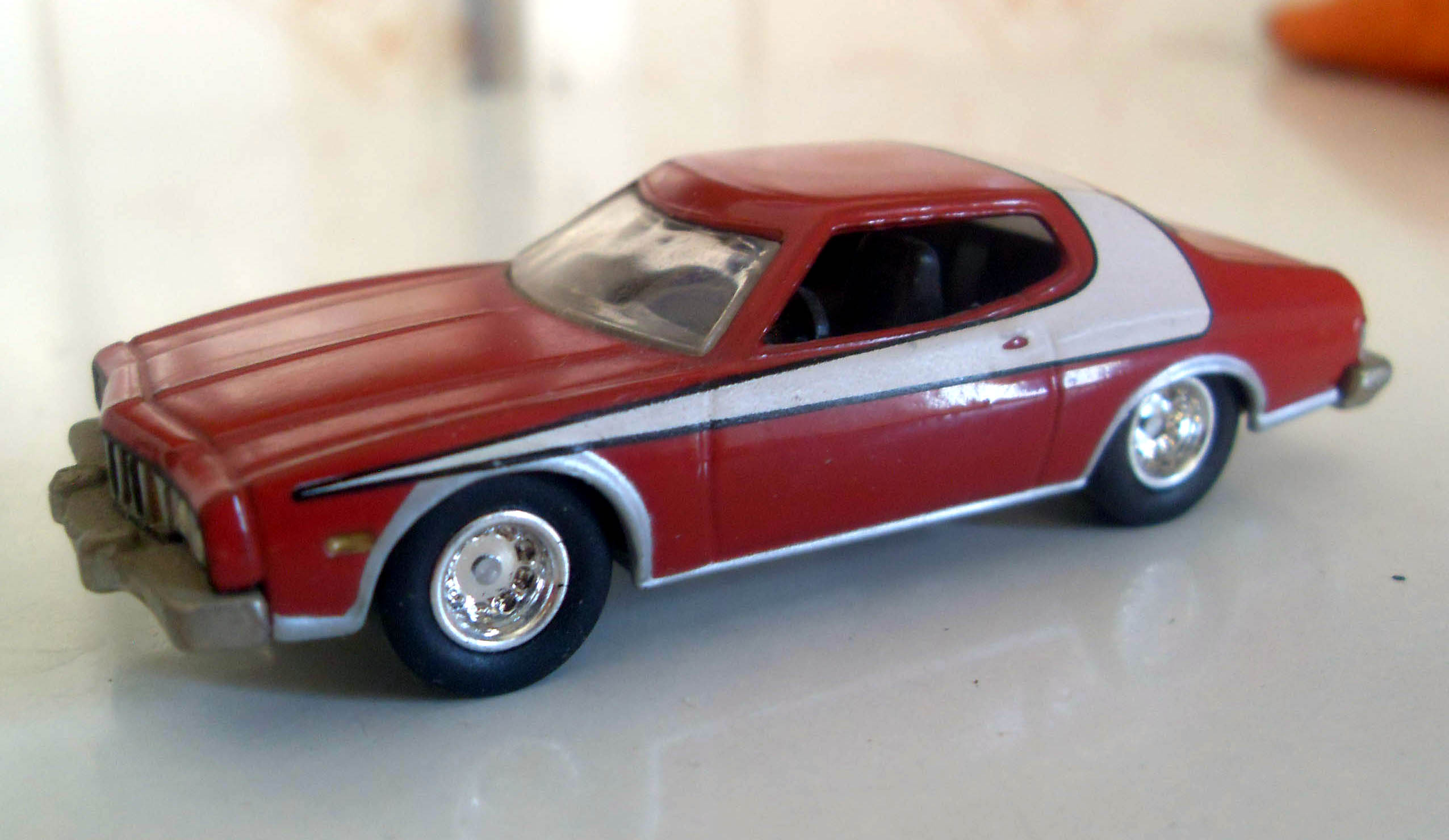
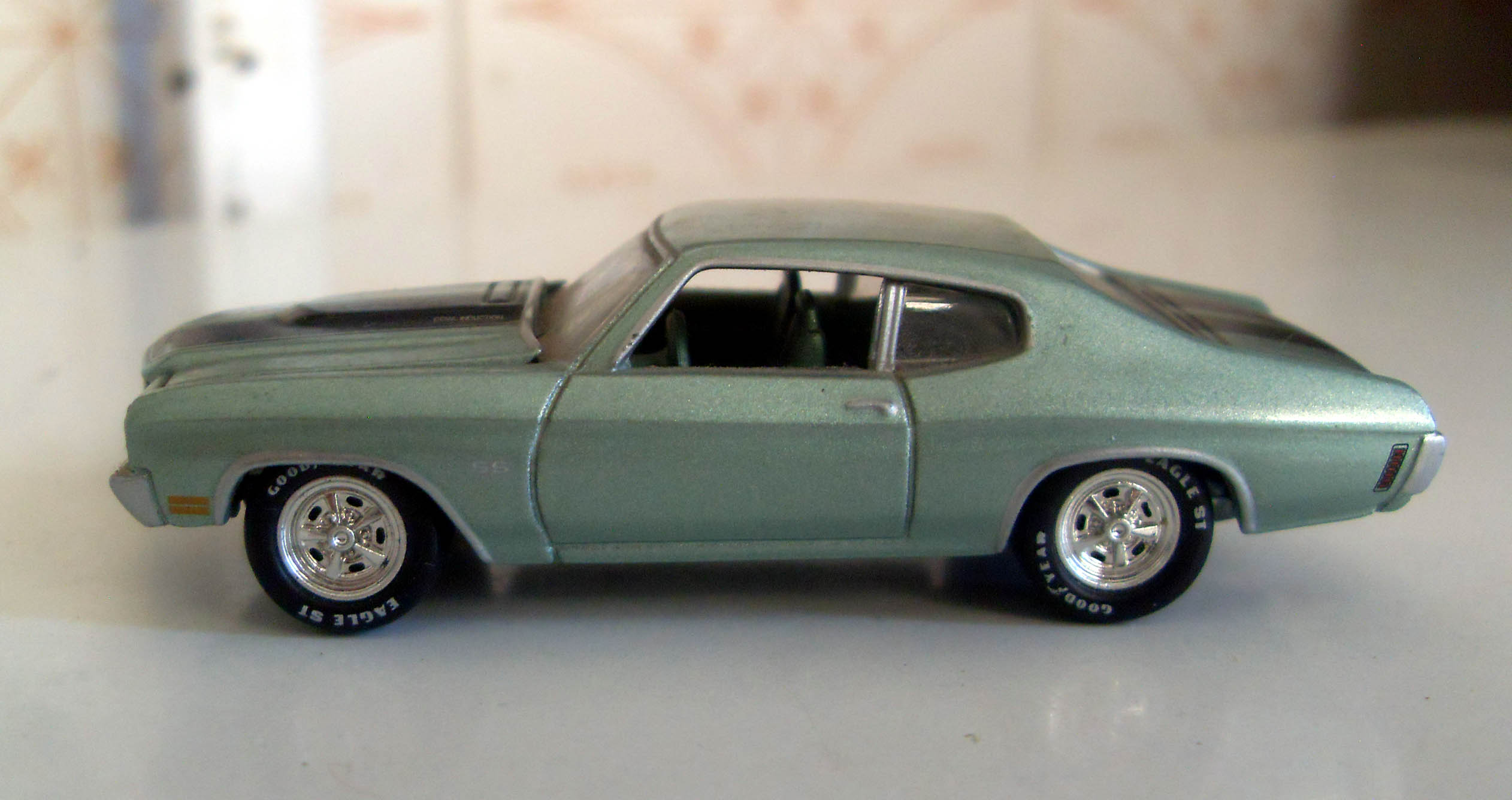
Model cars in 1:64 scale by Hot Wheels, INNO Models & Johnny Lightning, fltr (above): 1969 Chevrolet Corvette, 1977 Pontiac Firebird; (middle):Honda Accord CL7 Euro R, Ferrari F40 LB Works; (below): 1975 Ford Torino Starsky & Hutch, 1970 Chevrolet Chevelle.

The 1:64 scale is a traditional scale for models and miniatures, in which one unit (such as an inch or a centimeter) on the model represents 64 units on the actual object. It is also known as the "three-sixteenths scale" since 3/16 of an inch represents one foot. An average human is approximately 1 1/16 inches (27 mm) tall when represented in 1:64 scale.

== Popularity ==
The 1:64 scale originated by halving the common 1:32 scale, which was known as "standard size" in some hobbies.

This smaller scale became successful due to its relative size compared to other toys. It is a derivative of the 1/16 scale, and because small hands easily hold them. The 1/64 scale models will generally have less detail than a 1/16 scale models. Moreover, "1/64 coincides with the S scale of model railroading, part of the consideration of why 1/64 became an established size."

Currently, the 1:64 scale is most commonly used for automobiles and other vehicle models. It is also a popular scale for model railroads and toy trains. It has also been used for ship models. Additionally, 28mm military and fantasy figures are a popular size for tabletop gaming. They are sometimes scaled out to 1:64, although opinions on the actual scale of 28mm range from 1:48 to 1:64, with 1:56 being the most common.

== Die-cast vehicles ==
Many die-cast automobiles and commercial vehicle models for collectors have been made to a strict scale of 1:64. However, for much of the die-cast toy market, 1:64 is only a nominal scale. Though collectors and manufacturers loosely describe popular lines of die-casts as 1:64, toy vehicles are usually made to "box scale." This means that the model's size is determined by the standard packaging size (formerly a card stock box, now usually a clear blister card). For example, models of a 1959 Cadillac and a 1959 Mini are designed to fit the same packaging space, so each will have different actual scales. Nevertheless, for passenger automobiles in many die-cast lines, 1:64 is a reasonable approximation. Brands of die-cast toys in and around this scale include Hot Wheels, Ertl, GreenLight, Auto World, Code 3, Johnny Lightning, and Jada Toys.

Outside the US, brands like Matchbox, Maisto, Siku Toys, Corgi, Tomica, Autoart, Kyosho, Majorette, TrueScale Miniatures, Schuco, among many others, are available in this scale.

== Photography ==
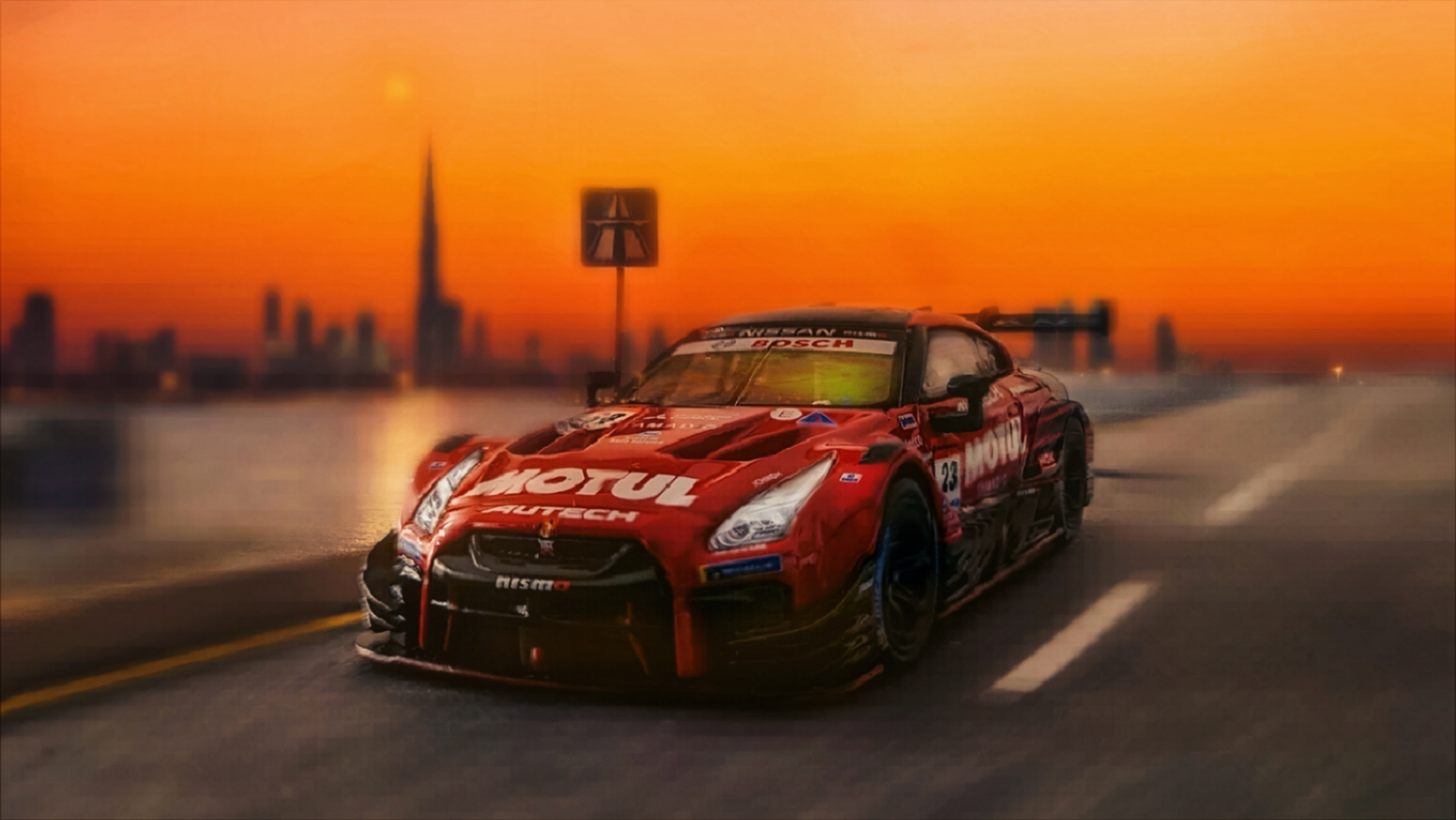
1/64 TrueScale Miniatures(MINI GT) Nissan GT-R at Dubai Creek during sunset

Die-cast models have become an object of photography as a hobby, where photographers use close-ups of the models and dioramas. Natural backroads are sometimes used along with techniques such as color grading, forced perspective, rule of thirds, and focus stacking.

== Model horses ==
Breyer Animal Creations' brand Mini Whinnies, introduced in 2005, are the smallest scale of Breyer model horses, measuring 1 ½" high for adults and 1" for foals (1:64 scale). Initially produced by Creata Winner's Choice and sculpted by Candance Liddy, they are aimed at young collectors and usually sold in easy-to-carry packages and playsets; they are currently sold as blind bags.

== Slot cars ==
Small-scale slot cars are often sized to fit a standard motorized chassis and, thus, vary somewhat in scale.

The mechanisms have increased in size over the years to generate more power. The so-called "HO" sized slot cars, introduced in the 1960s at about 1:76 scale, now average around 1:64 scale.

Pictured is an early example of an approximately 1:64 slot car built by Aurora around 1972, as part of its AFX line. This first-generation AMC Matador coupe NASCAR race car replica is designed to fit on an enlarged chassis for a nominal HO track.

The 1:64 slot car lines include Micro Scalextric, from the maker of the pioneering 1:32 scale slot cars. Tomy-Aurora and Life-Like also produced cars that average close to 1:64. Mattel's die-cast Hot Wheels Racing series and the Winner's Circle have also made die-cast scenes of 1/64-scale pit crews and race officials that look right with the appropriate NASCAR slot car models.

== Wargaming ==
Metal figures for tabletop wargaming and role-playing gaming are usually not described by scale ratio, but by the approximate height of a human figure, in millimeters. Manufacturers gradually enlarged the standard 25 mm figures of the 1970s, first describing them as "large 25s," or "heroic 25s." By the 1990s, they were called 28 mm. figures, and had largely replaced 25s as the standard size for role-playing and many military games. Accessories scaled to match 28 mm gaming figures are generally built to 1:64 scale. More accurate to 1/64 scale car models would be the 20mm figures, or approximately 1/72.

== Model trains ==
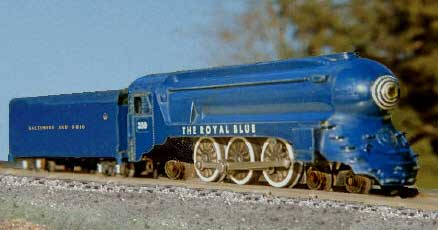
American Flyer Royal Blue locomotive from the 1950s in S gauge

From the late 1940s to the mid-1960s, 1:64 was a popular scale in the U.S. model railroad market, called S scale or S gauge. It remains a modestly popular scale, with a dedicated following. A.C. Gilbert, a major toy manufacturer, challenged the predominant O scale (1:48) manufacturers such as Lionel with a fully developed line of 1:64 scale and semi-scale equipment marketed under the American Flyer brand. Because they were 25% smaller than traditional O scale models, they ran on a two-rail track that was more realistic than the traditional 3-rail O gauge track. These features would become standard characteristics of model trains in later years when the even-smaller HO scale (1:87) took over the model train market from both the O and S scale trains. The S-scale survives currently with a small number of manufacturers producing scale equipment for hobbyists and collectors who seek out the 1950s-era American Flyer equipment to run trains on nostalgic layouts.

Since the 1930s, O scale (1:48) train manufacturers, including Gilbert, Lionel, and Marx, have produced bargain or introductory lines of undersized toy trains to run on O-gauge track with very tight curves, known as 0-27 track. Though sold as an O gauge, the bodies of these undersized cars and engines were often scaled to 1:64 proportions. The origins of Gilbert's S-gauge equipment can be traced to its American Flyer O-27 line of 1938 and after.

== Ships and boats ==
Kit manufacturers such as Tamiya Corporation have also used 1:64 as a scale for boats and small ships.

== See also ==
- List of scale model sizes
