= Lincoln International (New Zealand) =

Lincoln International was a New Zealand-based toy company that produced some of the earliest Batman memorabilia under official license from DC Comics. Most of the toys had little to do with actual concepts from the Batman comic books or TV series. The Batman Seaplane (1967) for example, was a repaint of the Howard Hughes Spruce Goose. Other Batman products included the Batman Escape Gun, which fired two "Bat Darts" and two "Flying Gadgets", and a Batman Space Probe that launches into the air under the power of water. A particularly out-of-character pistol was also sold as "Doctor Who's anti-Dalek Fluid Neutralizer. They also produced licensed merchandise based on Captain Scarlet and the Mysterons. In 1975, they produced a military toy line called Soldiers in Action.

Other toys they made are a series of seven Monster figures (not licensed Universal Monsters) that are popular among collectors. The seven figures include Count Dracula, Wolf Man, The Hunchback of Notre-Dame, The Phantom of the Opera, Frankensten [sic], Mummy, and Girl Victim, the latter being a rare Spiegel catalog exclusive that appears to be derived from a line called "Mod Miss." Heiler notes on his website that the Aurora Plastics Corporation Monster Series: The Victim (later rebranded as Dr. Deadly's Daughter) model from 1971 erupted in controversy that make its inclusion in the line a strange choice in 1975. Their most infamous unlicensed figure was Mr. Rock, a knock-off of Mego Corporation's authorized Spock figure, that commands higher prices on the collector's market than its licensed counterpart.
