= Model Car Hall of Fame =

The Model Car Hall of Fame is an annual awards ceremony for the die-cast toy, scale model and slot car industries.

== History ==
The new logo as adopted in 2017

Founded in 2009, The Model Car Hall of Fame is not affiliated with or part of the original the Diecast Hall of Fame. The original and current Diecast Hall of Fame is part of The Diecast Car Collector Club and Diecast.org. Jay Olins, Tony Perrone, and The Diecast Zone founded the Diecast Scale Model Hall of Fame in 1997 to recognize leaders and innovators in the hobby. The Model Car Hall of Fame Recipients have included company founders who shaped the hobby by raising the standard for quality and authenticity as well as broadening the subject matter. Separately, the Model Car Hall of Fame is an annual award event held in Las Vegas with a number of different awards. The Hall is supported by 77 clubs, forums and blogs from 18 countries. The 2017 Award Ceremony was held on November 2 with the 2017 class being announced: Tim Allen as Automotive Legend, Paul G. Lang, Minichamps as Diecast Entrepreneur, Tony Karamitsos, Round 2 (the company that makes Auto World, Johnny Lightning and Racing Champions) as Diecast Designer, Joe Alvarado as Diecast Customizer, Robert Fellows as Diecast Historian and Woody Itson as Collector of the Year.

== Inductees ==
The more than 170 inductees include

- Carroll Shelby
- Chip Foose
- Francis Choi
- George Barris
- Jay Leno
- Larry Wood
- Mario Andretti
- Michael Zarnock
- Richard Petty
- Tim Allen
