= Schumacher BTCC =

The Schumacher BTCC is a race series for radio-controlled cars. It is organised by Schumacher Racing Products in the UK and run to BRCA rules. The series takes place on eight different tracks all over the UK, however it is not to be confused with the BRCA National Championship series.

The championship was first started by Schumacher in 1995 solely as a modified touring car support class to the BRCA Pro-10 circuit championship, but within a couple of years, the entries for the touring cars surpassed the Pro-10's, and Schumacher organised a separate meeting to cater for everyone.

It generally features three classes: Stock 27t, Superstock 19t and Modified & Brushless for any make of touring car. 2006 also featured a class for its GTRe on road racer, a three speed electric circuit car. This class took over from Schumacher's previous Big 6 Lotus class, but was dropped early in 2007 due to lack of entrants.

Each BTCC round features three qualifying heats and two finals, with the best 10 final results counting to each drivers score. The qualifying tames place under usual FTD (fastest time of the day) rules, with A-Z Finals. The top three in each final get a trophy. These are supplied by the host club, but Schumacher funds end-of-season trophies to the top three overall drivers in each class, and a special Cecil Schumacher Trophy, to the top Modified driver, in recognition of the origin of the championship. Uniquely, Schumacher provides a range of prizes for an end-of-meeting raffle, in which any entrant has an equal chance of winning. The series uses control tyers, which are the Sorex 28R, 32R or 36R, each pre-glued with a Sorex insert and Rev-Lite wheel. For the first time in 2006 tyre warmers were allowed.

== BTCC 2006 winners ==
- 27t - Adrian Bidewell (Team Japan/Yokomo MR4-BD)
- 19t - Jonathan Dronfield (Short Circuit Models/Hot Bodies Cyclone)
- Modified - Colin Price (Schumacher/Schumacher Mi2 EC)
- GTRe - Jason Butterfield (Schumacher/Schumacher GTRe)

== BTCC 2007 winners ==
- 27t - Rob West (Schumacher/Schumacher Mi3)
- 19t - Jimmy Maddison (Schumacher/Schumacher Mi3)
- Modified - Elliot Harper (Mirage/Hot Bodies Cyclone)
