= TrueScale Miniatures =

Hong Kong scale model manufacturer

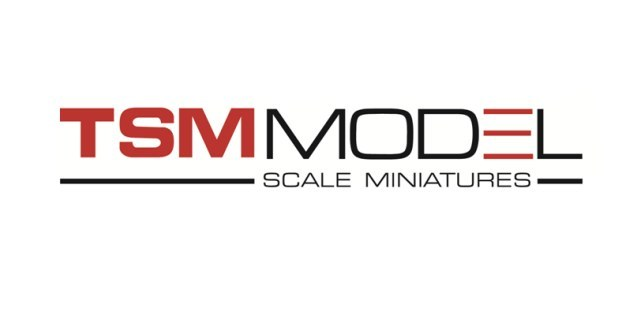
- Type: Private
- Industry: Manufacturing
- Founded: 2006; 20 years ago
- Headquarters: Hong Kong
- Area served: Global
- Key people: Glen Chou (director)
- Products: die-cast scale model cars
- Subsidiaries: MINI GT
- Website: tsm-models.com

TrueScale Miniatures (also known for its acronym TSM) is a Hong Kong–based manufacturing company of collectible scale model vehicles, founded by the Taiwanese Glen Chou in 2006. By 2007 TrueScale Miniatures had released their first product; scale replicas of snap-on brand tools called "Garage Essentials".

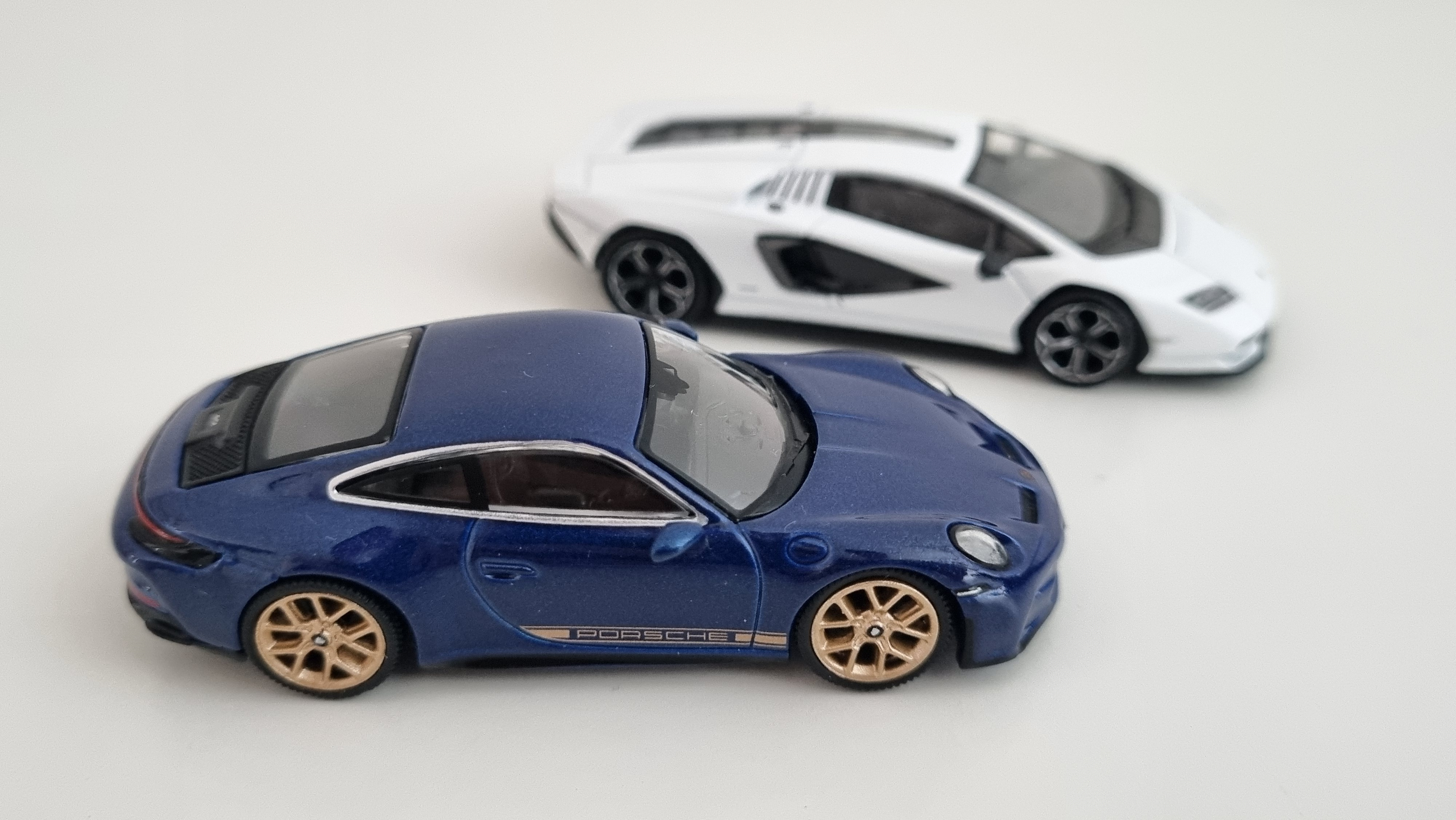
1:64 scale Porsche 911 & Lamborghini Countach by MINI GT

"TrueScale" or "TSM" as it is often referred to in collecting community forums, exhibits a focus on motor sports with leanings towards classic Formula 1 and sports car racing in its various forms.

== Industry ==
TrueScale Miniatures caters to model car collectors and motor sports fans through various channels, but their main focus is in the model car hobby industry as evidenced in their heavy advertising and product reviews in industry specific magazines such as Car Room magazine, and attendance at select hobby related trade shows such as the Nuremberg International Toy Fair. Typically, their products can be found in hobby and collectible shops, various online retailers, motor sports related shops, race track vendors, and occasionally even automotive museums.

== Snap-On ==
TrueScale Miniatures’ first products were 1:18 and 1:43 scale replicas of specific tools from the Snap-on catalog. These miniature tool sets are typically used by modelers and collectors for use in automotive dioramas. These first sets are called "Garage Essentials" and include miniature replicas of 10 tools in the 2006 Snap-on Tool Catalog that would be found in many household garages. In 2008 they released their "Shop Essentials" set which offers scaled replicas of Snap-on tools found in many automotive service stations. Both sets are a part of their "Garage Series" which can still be found not only in many industry related retail outlets, but some official Snap-on franchisees as well. The 1:18 scale sets are mainly diecast metal with some plastic implementation whereas the 1:43 scale sets are mainly plastic with some diecast metal.

== Entrance into diecast model market ==
In early 2008, TrueScale made its entrance into the diecast model car market when it began producing its own line of 1:18 scale replicas, beginning with the 1980 Porsche 935 K3 Le Mans Apple Computer car. With opening doors, and a removable hood and tail section revealing a highly detailed engine, they had debuted what Sports Car Digest called "A thoroughly impressive (model) from every angle."

== Signature Series ==
The Signature Series is a line of models within the TrueScale Miniatures brand in which the race car driver, team owner, or someone pivotal in the successes of the real race car lends their hand signature to the base of the model. The signatures are hand signed and not artificially replicated making their Signature Series models more sought after than similar models. The models themselves are limited in production quantity, typically less than a thousand pieces, which further adds to their appeal to collectors.

Persons associated with the Signature Series:

- Dan Gurney
- Jim Hall
- Jody Scheckter
- Juan Manuel Fangio II
- P J Jones
- Mario Andretti
- Peter Brock
- Gordon Murray
- Ron Dennis

== Worldwide presence ==
TrueScale Miniatures is currently distributed in over 20 countries around the world. Their products have also been routinely featured in numerous international magazines, including The Diecast Magazine of Australia, Modell Fahrzeug of Germany and Model Cars of Japan.

== Coca-Cola ==
Beginning in late 2009 and continuing through 2010, TrueScale Miniatures produced a series of Porsche race car models featuring Coca-Cola livery, all driven by driver Bob Akin. While this was not the first time that a Coca-Cola race car model had been produced by a company, TrueScale received recognition for their production.

== Mini GT ==
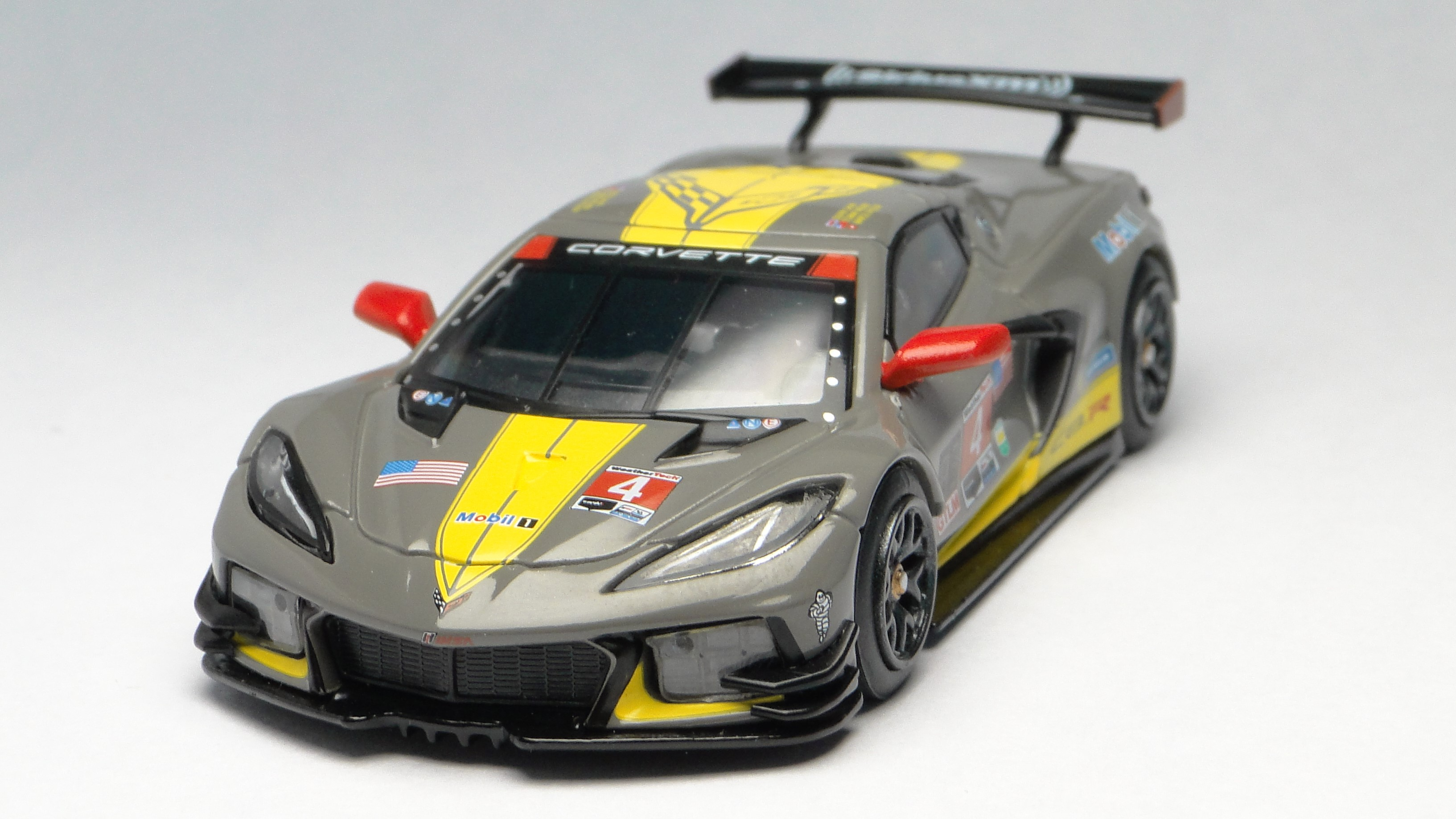
Corvette C8.R IMSA by MINI-GT (1/64)

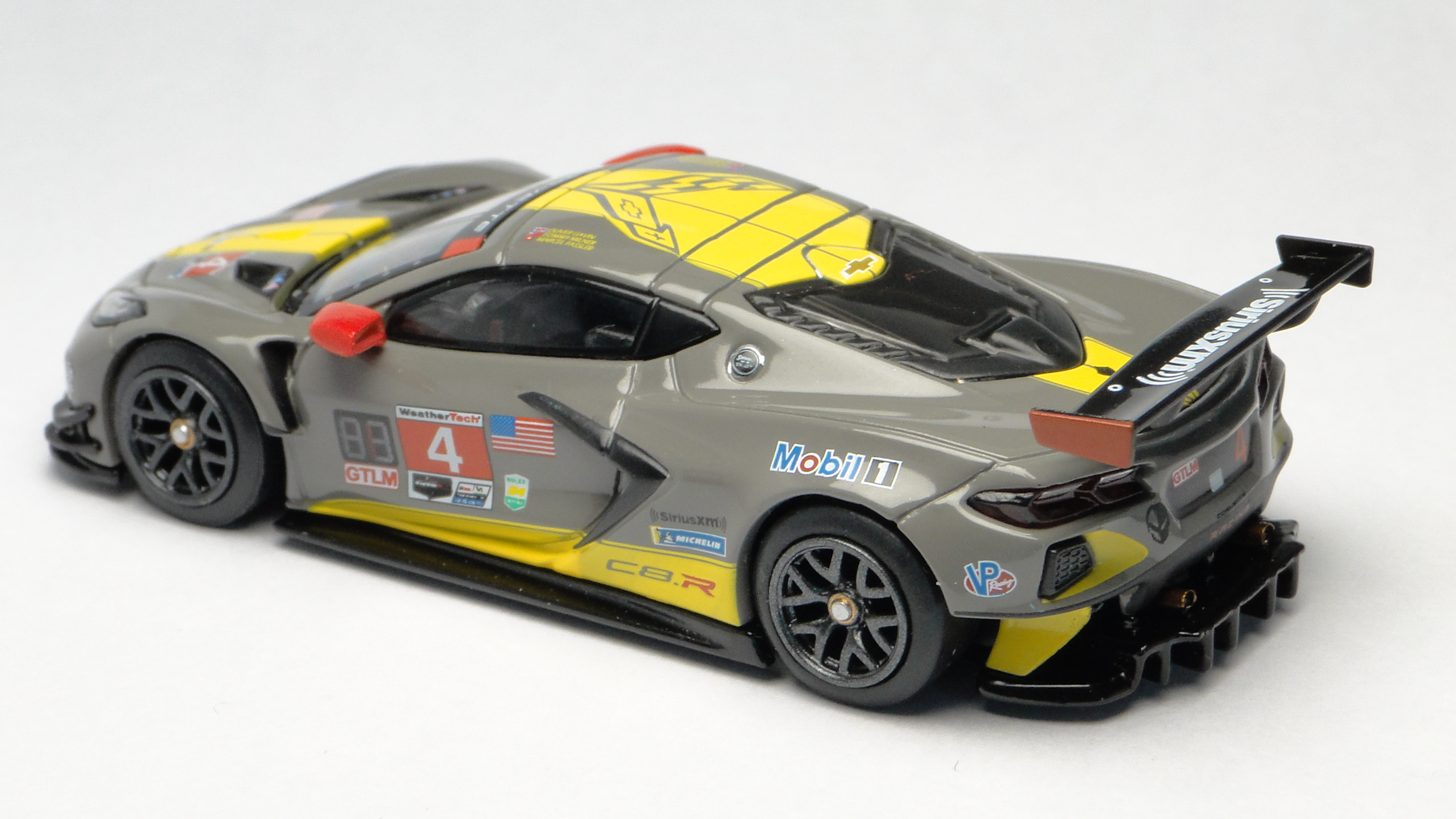

A 1:64 scale line featuring a variety of vehicles was launched in the mid-2010s. While still producing highly detailed models, the Mini GT line focuses more on affordability, being similar to Greenlight Collectibles and POP RACE products in quality. Each MINI GT Model is produced in full diecast metal, with the chassis being fully reproduced.

== Brands of models produced ==
- Alfa Romeo
- All American Racers
- Aston Martin
- Bentley
- Bugatti
- Buick
- BMW
- Chevrolet
- Cadillac
- Datsun
- Ducati
- Ford
- Goggomobil
- Honda
- Hyundai
- Jaguar
- Koenigsegg
- Lancia
- Land Rover
- Lamborghini
- Lincoln
- Lola
- McLaren
- Mercedes-Benz
- Mini
- Nissan
- Pagani
- Porsche
- Red Bull Racing
- Rolls-Royce
- Toyota
- Tyrrell
