= HPI Baja 5B/5T =

HPI Baja 5B
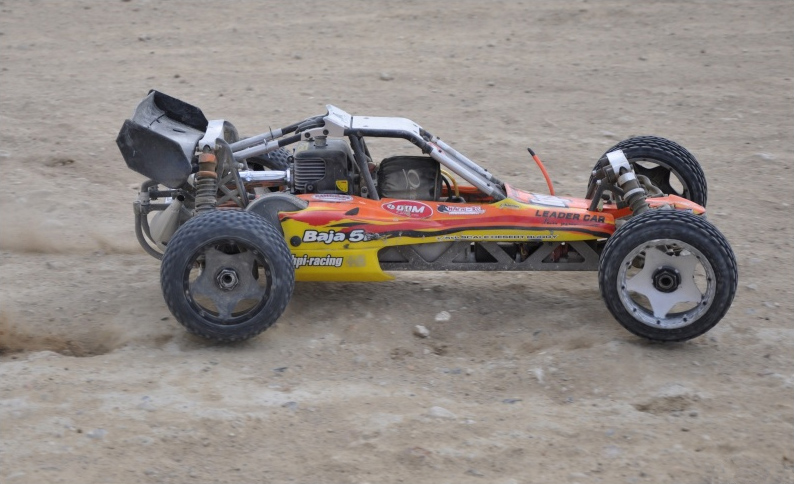
- HPI Baja 5B
- Category: 1:5 Large Scale Off-Road buggy
- Constructor: Hobby Products International
- Designer: Akira Kogawa

Technical specifications
- Length: 817 mm (32.2 in)
- Width: Front: 460 mm (18.1 in); Rear 480 mm (18.9 in)
- Height: 5.20 in (132.1 mm)
- Axle track: Front: 395 mm (15.6 in); Rear 400 mm (15.7 in)
- Wheelbase: 570 mm (22.4 in)
- Engine: Fuelie 23 cc (1.4 cu in) Rear mid-engine, rear-wheel-drive layout
- Weight: 9.6 kg (21.2 lb)
- Tyres: HPI Dirt Buster

Competition history

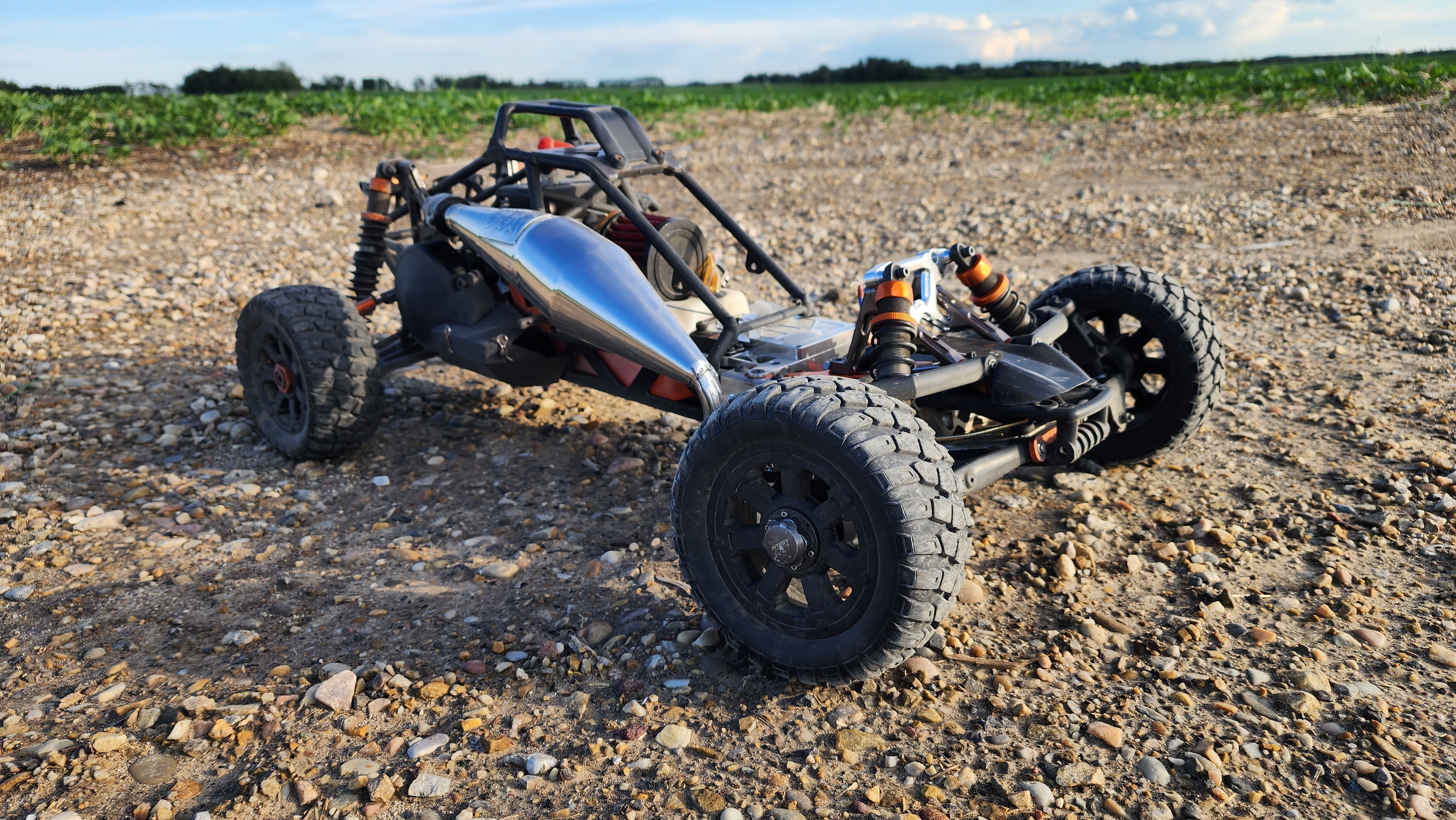
OBR 34cc fullmod 9.5hp

The HPI Baja 5B and Baja 5T is a 1:5 scale radio controlled off-road buggy and truck manufactured by Hobby Products International (HPI). The car is sold either in a kit or RTR (Ready to Run) with in a 23cc gasoline engine, or in a limited edition SS kit with 26cc engine, or for a short period, battery powered. Initially introduced with a buggy body style, a short course truck style was later offered to the market and was joined in 2015 by the Baja 5R, an on-road car.

== History ==
HPI, then known for its 1:10 and 1:8 scale cars, tasked Akira Kogawa, noted for his work of some of Kyosho's 1:10 electric off-road cars from the 1980s such as the Scorpion (1982), Optima (1985) and Ultima (1987), with designing an inexpensive alternative to the European large scale off-road buggy that were only sold in a kit form, emphasizing on build quality, and parts availability like its popular 1:10 and 1:8 scale equivalents offered, as well as being able to match its handling characteristics and have adjustable parts without affecting its aesthetic value.

The car strongly resembled popular but smaller electric off-road buggies, hinting Kogawa's design influences to the original Ultima.

Its unexpected success led to it to become one of the most cloned radio-controlled models on the market.

Despite the minor scale difference, the 5B is compliant to BRCA regulations with one driver finishing 2nd with a 5B SS at the EFRA Large Scale Off-Road Euros in 2008

== World Championships in Athletics ==
The Baja Super 5SC Flux was used as retriever cars in the 2013 World Championships in Athletics, the car was adapted to enable it to carry heavy track and field projectiles and two javelins.
