= Code 3 Collectibles =

- Industry: Collecting
- Founded: 1997
- Founder: Arnie Rubin
- Defunct: 2011; 15 years ago
- Headquarters: Woodland Hills, U.S.
- Products: Scale model fire engines, trucks, cars
- Parent: Matrix Holdings Ltd. (2007–11)

Code 3 Collectibles was an American company based in Woodland Hills, Los Angeles that created customized scale model vehicles. The company was founded by Arnie Rubin, who had previously established Funrise Toy Corporation, owner of Tonka among other brands.

Code 3 was mostly known for its high quality scale model emergency (such as ambulances or police cars) and fire trucks, although the range of products marketed by the company include scale model trucks, and cars. The company was also licensee to produce Star Wars spaceship models.

On April 25, 2007, Matrix Holdings Ltd. entered into a multimillion-dollar agreement with Code 3 Collectibles to purchase the company. On August 19, 2011, Code 3 Collectibles announced that it was stopping all production. The last model released to date is a Seagrave Marauder Aerialscope lettered for FDNY Truck 46.

== Concept ==
The models created by Code 3 Collectibles, were stock models which had been customized or converted from their original state. A few examples of Code 3 Collectibles models plain white cars or vans which have been painted or have had decals added with the livery of a police force such as stripes, force badge/crest, force code etc. Extras such as lightbars and possibly tools have been added as well. Another example would be a plain truck which has been decaled/painted to have the livery parts of a company. Sometimes creating new parts, removing parts, or adding extra parts are done as well to add to the realism of the model.
