= Bill Campbell (illustrator) =

American cartoonist and illustrator

William Wallace Campbell
- Born: February 14, 1920; Bunker Hill, Massachusetts, U.S.
- Died: March 7, 2017 (aged 97); Paulding County, Georgia, U.S.
- Education: Hyde Park High School; Art Institute of Chicago
- Known for: Hawk Model Company plastic model kits Weird-ohs

William Wallace Campbell (February 14, 1920 – March 7, 2017) was an American freelance illustrator and cartoonist and the creator of the "Weird-ohs", "Silly Surfers", and "Frantics" plastic model kit series for the Hawk Model Company, which were popular in the early 1960s.

== Biography ==
Campbell was born and raised at Bunker Hill, Massachusetts. Three years later his family and he moved to Chicago, Illinois. Campbell decided that he wanted to be an artist by the age of five. He always had a passion for transportation and the modern theme of it, and he usually incorporated it into his work. He had the hobby of photographing and sketching the trains and locomotives that came from Englewood Union Station and Chicago's Municipal Airport.

He received his education and majored in Art and Music at Hyde Park High School. In the year of 1934, Bill Campbell was inspired when he saw The Hawk Model Company booth. Bill Campbell received a scholarship to attend the Chicago Art Institute. While attending this institution, Campbell was able to work with commercial illustrating that allowed him to realize that illustrating is something he wanted to do with his life. He graduated in the late 1930s.

After graduating college, he was able to work several jobs and within several agencies around Chicago. He finally ended up in a job at Michigan Avenue Studio doing cartoon strip illustrations. It ended up being a scam. The agent sold his work and did not pay Bill Campbell for it. All of this was happening while the Great Depression was going on. Bill eventually was able to find a different job at Blomgren Studios.

Campbell died in Paulding County, Georgia on March 7, 2017, at the age of 97.

== See also ==
- Big Daddy Roth
