= Aurora Plastics Corporation =

American Toy Company

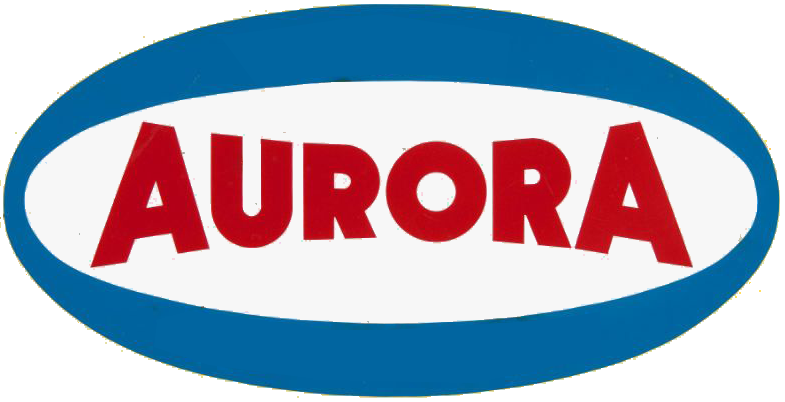
- Company type: Private (1950–69); Subsidiary (1969–80)
- Industry: Entertainment
- Founded: 1950
- Founder: Joseph E. Giammarino
- Defunct: 1980; 46 years ago
- Fate: Sold to private investors in 1969, then other owners, becoming a brand
- Headquarters: Brooklyn, New York; United States
- Products: Scale model cars, airplanes, action figures, slot cars
- Brands: AFX

The Aurora Plastics Corporation was an American toy and hobby manufacturing company. It is known primarily for its production of plastic scale models of cars, airplanes, and TV and movie figures in the 1960s. Its principal competition in modeling were various other plastic modeling firms like Revell and Monogram.

Established in 1950, the company was first sold in 1969, being then acquired by other firms until then-parent company Dunbee-Combex-Marx ceased operations in 1980. Since then, the Giammarino family have tried to reintroduce the Aurora brand, but their attempts never carried out.

== History ==
Aurora Plastics Corporation was founded in March 1950 by engineer Joseph E. Giammarino (1916–1992) and businessman Abe Shikes (1908–1986) in Brooklyn, New York (moving to West Hempstead, Long Island in 1954), as a contract manufacturer of injection molded plastics.

With the hiring in 1952 of salesman John Cuomo (1901–1971), the company began the manufacture of its own line of plastic model kits, efficiently marketed with a skeleton staff. The target market were young hobbyists, similar to the kits of the rival companies, Monogram and Revell. Aurora profitably targeted a younger demographic than their competitors, creating smaller-sized, less detailed models at a lower price.

The first kits came in late 1952 and were 1:48 scale aircraft models. One was a F9F Panther jet and the other an F90 Lockheed. The Aurora logo at this time appeared in narrow white letters and in a semi-circular form across the top of the script; the more recognized Aurora oval did not appear until 1957. Boxes were a simply illustrated orange color. The slogan under the Aurora logo was "U – Ma – Kit" (You Make It). Aurora's market approach was to make kits simple, thus undercutting the competition. Along these lines these first two kits appear to have been Hawk kits measured and copied to Aurora's own molds.

By 1953, six more dies had been made for new airplanes: the Curtiss P-40E Warhawk, Messerschmitt Bf 109, North American F-86D, and the Lockheed P-38L Lightning, and a fictitious Russian "Yak-25" (later sold as "Mig-19"). Lastly was the Mitsubishi Zero, called the "Jap Zero" on the box flaps. With the first two Hawk copies, this collection was called the "Brooklyn Eight".

== Product lines ==
=== Aircraft mainstay ===
Aurora Plastic's first kits were aircraft and this was a backbone of sales through the 1950s and 1960s. From early on the company's Famous Fighters line was popular. Included were World War I, World War II, jet age aircraft and a variety of whirlybirds. A series of aircraft from the 1930s were also offered. Sailing ships, warships, tanks and other military vehicles were available as well. One World War I airplane was the DeHavilland Airco DH.4. Many planes, like the Blue Angel F-4J, McDonnell-Douglas Phantom II and the LTV A-7D Corsair II, were offered in a larger 1/48 scale. Others were smaller scale such as the Boeing KC-135 Stratotanker in about 1:100, because it would have been over two feet long in 1/48; and even smaller, like the Convair B-58 Hustler bomber in a diminutive 1:200 scale, or about 6 inches long.

=== Automotive kits ===
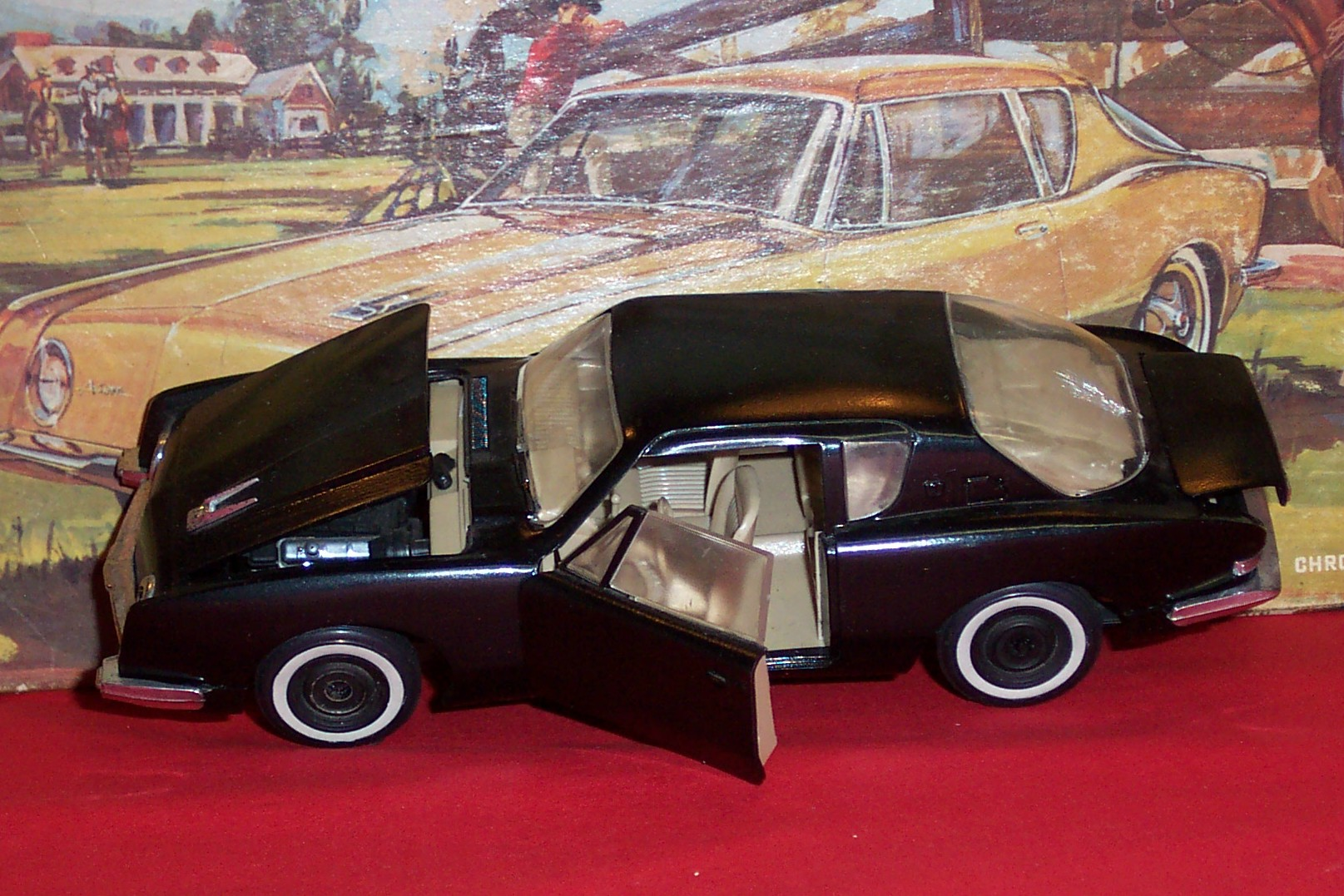
Studebaker Avanti 1960s kit from Aurora

By 1965, Aurora had many automobile kits in 1:32 "slot car" scale including the Triumph TR3, MG-TD, Jaguar XK120, Austin-Healey 3000, Alfa Romeo GT convertible, Mercedes-Benz 300 SL convertible, 1958 Ford "Squarebird" Thunderbird, the American Cunningham, and a few Indianapolis 500 winners, like the Monroe Special, and the Fuel Injection Special.

=== Media tie-ins ===
Aurora probably had their biggest success with their kits of figures. These included a series of popular historical knights in armor, and other still life buildings, animals, boats, and other intriguing objects. Guys and Gals of all Nations were also produced and included Dutch, Chinese, Indian, Scottish and Mexican figures.

Aurora acquired a license from Universal Studios to create a line of kits based on the Universal monsters, which became the company's most popular offerings. Aurora's kit of Frankenstein appeared in 1961. Giant Frankenstein was an all-plastic kit that, when assembled, created a 19-inch tall model. This was followed by 12 other monster figures that were issued and reissued in various versions through the early 1970s. These included RKO Pictures' King Kong, and characters from Toho Studios: Godzilla, and later in 1975, Ghidrah (Ghidorah), and Rodan. After this, monster vehicles such as Dracula's Dragster, Frankenstein's Flivver, Godzilla's Go-Cart, King Kong's Thronester, Mummy's Chariot and Wolfman's Wagon were introduced, fortifying the company's car offerings.

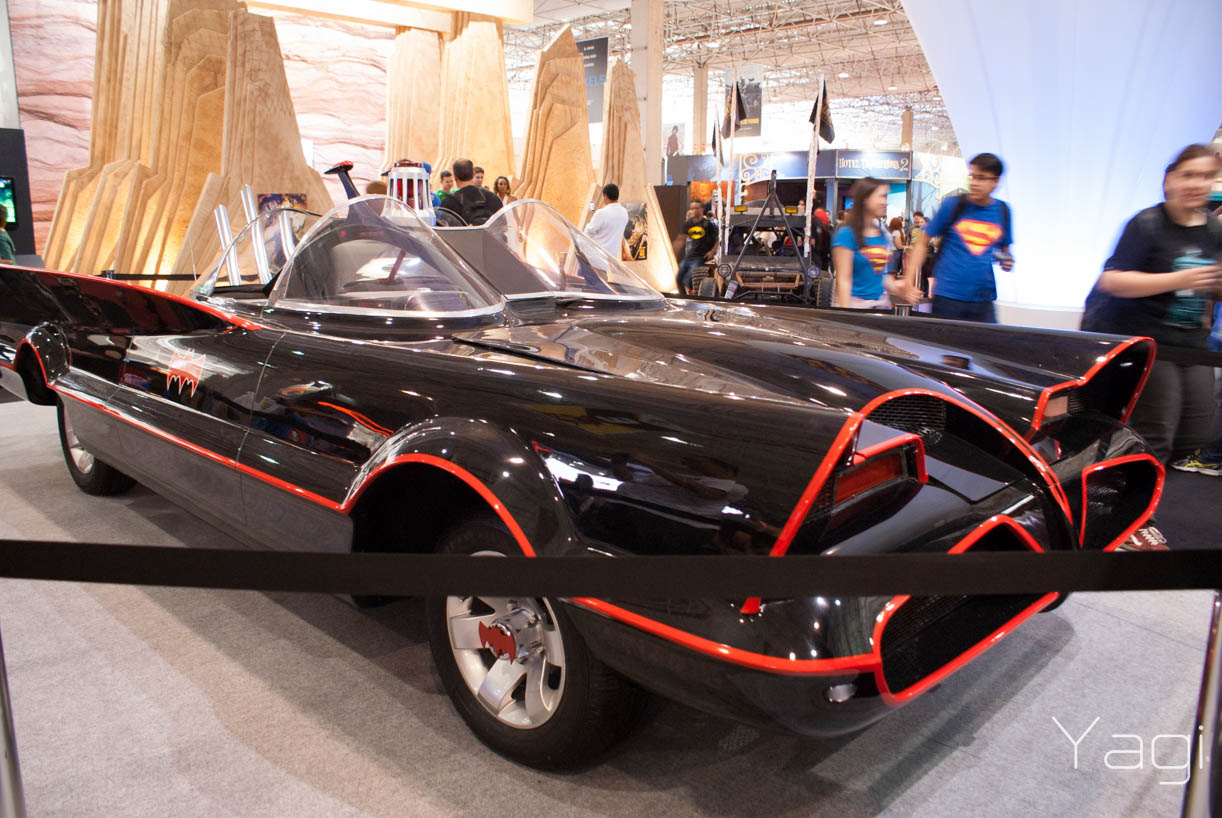
The 1966 Batmobile was one of the licensed products manufactured by Aurora

Licensed models based on characters from movies, TV shows and comic books were also introduced. Some of the most popular licensed products were the Batmobile and other vehicles from the 1966 TV series, launched in 1967. Batman was a regular offering as was the Hulk, so both DC and Marvel characters were represented. Model kits from Twelve O'Clock High, The Man from U.N.C.L.E., The Mod Squad, Voyage to the Bottom of the Sea (the larger Seaview sub and a separate kit of its flying sub), The Invaders, Lost in Space, Land of the Giants and Star Trek appeared. These kits were often a television-related scene where heroes battled some kind of large monster, alien or animal. Aurora's figure kits continue to be highly valued by collectors. Aurora used artist James Bama for some of their box art.

=== Model motoring ===
In the late 1950s, Aurora acquired the rights to the Model Motoring slot car racing system from UK toy manufacturer Playcraft. Aurora's first HO-gauge racing sets appeared in the fall of 1960.

The cars were originally driven by a unique, vibrator drive system based on a door "buzzer." This motor comprised a wire coil around a vertical iron plunger which very quickly opened and closed a contact which fed power to the coil, and also drove a reed up and down that engaged a toothed drum on the rear axle, causing it to turn. When these early cars ran down the track they produced a loud "buzz," which many users found irritating. The vibrator car was produced until 1963 when the Thunderjet pancake motor, or T-jet, replaced it. Following improvements in the chassis with the Thunderjet and A/FX series and the adoption of popular racing car body styles, Aurora's Model Motoring race sets became top sellers, with over 25,000,000 cars sold by 1965.

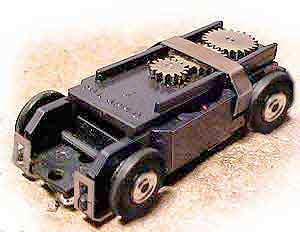
An Aurora Thunderjet, or T-jet, chassis, c. 1963

Part of the popularity of the Pancake motor cars was that they could easily be disassembled by the hobbyist with the simple removal of the brass gearplate clip which gave ready access to the armature, brushes and magnets, and serviced with readily available factory original replacement and upgrade parts. These upgrades included silver plated electrical parts for better electrical conductivity, and gears to raise the gear ratio to achieve higher speeds. Third party hop up parts and specialty tools soon came into the market, including stronger motor magnets, wider axles, wider wheels made of precision molded plastic or machined aluminum, brass axle weights to hold the front guide pin in the guide slot at higher cornering speed, and wider soft silicone tires that had better traction. Tools included pickup shoe benders, miniature gear and wheel pullers, gear and wheel presses. Another factor was that Aurora produced updates to the Pancake motor cars like the Thunderjet Tuff Ones, including hotter armatures, wider stance, wider tires, and later, magnatraction added to the A/FX chassis.

Magnatraction was accomplished by equipping the A/FX chassis with thicker motor magnets which extended lower into openings of the chassis, using magnetic attraction to the electrical rails in the track and pulling the chassis down which gave the tires better traction, resulting in higher speed and harder cornering. Many enthusiasts liked the higher speed, while others preferred the non-magnatraction cars. The non-magnatraction cars, although slower, allowed the rear end of the car to slide, or "drift" through the corners, creating a danger zone that allowed drivers to drive the car hard into the danger zone before reaching the crash point. Another part of the fun was the ability to slide the rear of the car and "nerf" a competitor's car off the track if the two went into a curve side by side. The magnatraction cars did not have this drift, and while cornering faster, the driver did not have this danger zone. The car would without warning crash off the track if the driver went into the corner too hard.

By the end of the 1970s, however, the slot car craze had passed and modeling in general was on the decline. One website attributes the decline to both the maturing of the baby-boom generation along with the fragile economics of the slot car industry and the closing of many slot car shops as toy companies offered smaller sets to be used at home.

But that did not mean the end of the legendary pancake motor cars. They had their enthusiasts that kept them alive, along with a large supply of new old stock, and companies continued to make third party parts. New body designs and reproductions of original bodies and chassis were produced under the names of Johnny Lightning, Playing Mantis, Round2, Auto World, and Hot rod. These reproductions were embraced by enthusiasts because they could modify the reproduction bodies instead of cutting vintage ones. These mods included grinding excess weight off the inside of the body, and cutting the mounting posts to lower the bodies in order to lower the center of gravity. Wheel wells would be cut to allow wider tires and lowering of the body. Reproductions were produced as recently as the year 2020, and some of them are still on hobby store shelves as of 2021. There is a vibrant community of small sellers on internet market and auction sites, and a few remaining shops with multi lane professional tracks still exist along with clubs whose members travel to other states for national sanctioned races. Some of these events are run with the name of "The Fray", and have a specific set of rules on how cars can be modified, and what parts must be in the original configuration. These races have a tech inspection afterwards for the cars that win prizes or points towards a national championship.

=== Cigarbox competes with Hot Wheels ===
In 1968, Aurora introduced its Cigarbox miniature cars and the timing could not have been worse. These were developed to compete with Matchbox in the year that Mattel's Hot Wheels were introduced. The Cigarbox car line was a combination of rather bland plastic slot car bodies with metal chassis. Models were claimed to be HO scale, but the cars were larger than HO – yet a bit smaller than Hot Wheels.

Cigarbox cars were packaged in small yellow cigar-like boxes which had fancy red serif lettering and gold trim. The boxes were slightly larger, flatter and more rectangular than those of Matchbox, measuring 4" x 2.75" x just over 1" deep. If Lesney could have "Match" boxes, Aurora figured it could have "Cigar" boxes. The popular rumor was that Matchbox took Aurora to court for copyright infringement over the similar marketing approach. Today the idea skirts the boundaries of the culturally acceptable. Was smoking being promoted? In any event, the Cigarbox marque soon disappeared.

Some of the cars offered, however, were unique and not often seen in miniature, such as the 1967 Ford Galaxie 500, 1963 Buick Riviera, Mako Shark Corvette concept, Cheetah Chevy, Lola GT racing coupe, and the Porsche 904. Several Formula 1 cars were also offered in the series. Initially, most cars were offered in rather plain colored plastic bodies with high friction ('squeaky') wheels, though their rubber tires were more authentic than hard plastic – making them somewhat similar to Matchbox tradition. Some of the cars, such as the De Tomaso Mangusta, had working steering. Eventually, thinner, low-friction wheels (some chromed and some not) were added and chrome-like shiny paint finishes were introduced, making the cars flashy, but competition was keen and financial troubles loomed. These improved versions were sold under the Speed Line name, and also as slot car bodies and in kit form, but the line was discontinued by 1970.

== Logo use and retooling ==
Aurora's founders retired in the late 1960s and the company was sold to outside investors in 1969. After expanding into the toys and games market with limited success, the new owners sold the company to Nabisco in 1971. Nabisco received unwanted publicity when Aurora introduced a line of “Monster Scenes” which included torture devices and a scantily clad female victim; newspapers reported negatively on the line, and the National Organization for Women voiced their objection. Seven years after their acquisition, Nabisco sold the company to the Anglo-US toy company Dunbee-Combex-Marx who also owned the Scalextric racing system and Frog kits for $11.5m. Aurora had been loss-making for a number of years but Dunbee-Combex-Marx failed to turn Aurora around and ended up failing itself in 1980.

Logo of "Polar Lights", a brand by Playing Mantis that reissued some of Aurora's popular kit models

In the late 1990s and early 2000s, toy and hobby company Playing Mantis created a division called "Polar Lights" (as a reference to Aurora) which reissued some of Aurora's most popular kits. Other companies following in Aurora's shoes have reissued earlier kits. These companies include "Moebius Models", "Atlantis Models" and "Monarch Models", which mostly have focused on the Aurora sci-fi and horror TV and movie figures and scenes. For example, Moebius Models, started by a former distributor of Polar Lights models in Glenwood, Florida, has reissued the large kit of the submarine Seaview from the 1960s Voyage to the Bottom of the Sea TV show and the old Dr. Jekyll as Mr. Hyde kit. Monarch Models, now Monarch Model Company, is based in London, Ontario, Canada – started by a doctor. Atlantis Models is based in Deer Park, New York, and though also making sci-fi figures, has equal focus on animal dioramas. In 2018 Atlantis Purchased most of the Aurora Tooling that remained at Revell Monogram in Elk Grove. Polar Lights, Monarch and Moebius all use an oval logo very similar in shape to that of the original Aurora style. The Atlantis (see Zorro re-issue) logo uses a more abstract, though nostalgic, oval broken into six sections.

In the 1990s, the family of Joseph Giammarino announced the return of Aurora Plastics Corporation as a manufacturer of hobby kits under the name LAPCO, or Lost Aurora Plastics Corporation, with a product line to include reverse engineered reissues of long-gone kits. Nothing came of this. Again in 2007, Giammarino's family announced the return of Aurora, with their first offerings stated to include aircraft and figure kits from their original 1960s line. This website lists products to be made available in May–June 2012, but as of November 2018, none are available to order and the site appears to have not been updated.

== Bibliography ==
- Gosson, Scotty (2015). Show Rod Model Kits. A Showcase of America's Wildest Model Kits. Forest Lake MN: CarTech Publishing. ISBN 9781613251560.
- Ragan, Mac (2000). Diecast Cars of the 1960s. Osceola WI: Motorbooks. ISBN 978-0760307199.
