= Donny Gillies =

Donny Gillies (born 1974 in Ottawa, Canada) is a San Francisco artist and designer best known for his work with metal band Metallica and Stern Pinball. Donny’s early career started with gig posters for local underground Ottawa bands and sign painting for local bars that eventually led to painting, airbrushing, design and illustration work with a large selection of clients including Swedish rock band The Hellacopters and later Metallica, Snap-on Tools, Stern Pinball, Fender Guitars, Dunlop, Powell Peralta, Vans, Creature skateboards, Kid Robot and Pabst Blue Ribbon. His influences include: Frank Frazetta, Jack Kirby, Chris Foss, and Ed Roth.

== Recent works ==
Donny's art has been featured in various books including Juztapoz Car Culture, Gig Posters volume 2, Kustom Graphics, Kustom Graphics 2, Pinstripe Planet, Surf Graphics, Speedseakers, Tiki Art Now, Electric Frankenstein; High energy rock n roll posters.

He is featured in The Lowdown On Lowbrow artist documentary and Mad Fabricators Art and Car documentary series.

Donny has created bass guitars for Maya Ford of the Donnas, and Robert Trujillo of Metallica. PaPa-Het guitar for James Hetfield of Metallica. Custom Metallica band pinball machine, which led to Gillies doing the artwork for a production Metallica pinball machine.

== Published works ==
- Monster Revolt, The Art of Dirty Donny Schiffer Books, 2010
- Pinball Wizards and Blacklight Destroyers: The Art of Dirty Donny Gillies Schiffer Books, 2016

== See also ==
- Lowbrow (art movement)
- Airbrush
- Illustrator
- Designer
- Stern Pinball
