= Round 2 (company) =

American manufacturing company

Round 2, LLC
- Type: LLC
- Industry: Metallurgy,
- Founded: 2005; 21 years ago
- Founder: Thomas E. Lowe
- Headquarters: South Bend, Indiana, U.S.
- Products: Scale models (die-cast, plastic, slot cars)
- Brands: AMT; Aurora; Hawk; Johnny Lightning; MPC
- Website: round2corp.com

Round 2, LLC is an American manufacturing company which produces scale models including die-cast, plastic, slot cars, and other hobby products. The company is based in South Bend, Indiana. The company was founded in 2005 by Thomas E. Lowe who previously owned toy company Playing Mantis. Round 2 holds several hobby brands, most of which were acquired and relaunched by Round 2 under the original brand name. Brands sold under Round 2 includes long-running model kit and diecast brands, including AMT, Hawk, Johnny Lightning, MPC, and Racing Champions.

== Brands by Round 2 ==
=== AMT ===
AMT, a long-running model kit brand first established in 1948, was bought by Lesney in 1979 and then by Ertl in 1982. In 1999, Ertl was bought by Racing Champions whose primary focus was diecast model. Racing Champions subsequently made a decision to sell off the model kit brands succeeded from the Ertl, including AMT. After the establishment of Round 2, Thomas Lowe showed an interest in purchasing AMT. In 2008, Lowe signed an agreement to produce and market AMT brand under Round 2. AMT brand and toolings were purchased outright by Round 2 in 2012.

=== Auto World ===
Auto World is a brand of diecast models and slot cars primarily focused on American-made cars. The brand was originally founded by Sports Car Club of America Hall of Famer Oscar Koveleski in 1958 and it also used to publish how-to magazines on model-car building. Today, Auto World diecast models have lineups for 1:18 and 1:64 scales. 1:64 scale Auto World cars are heavy into detail and accurately made in 1:64 scale, unlike many other diecast and toy car brands which often employ nominal 1:64 scale adjusted by the size of packaging.

=== Hawk ===
Hawk Model Company started off in 1928 as a manufacturer of wood aircraft models. Since then the company evolved into producing plastic airplane kits, 1:24 and 1:32 scale model car kits, as well as cartoon figure kits for the animated series Weird-Ohs. New models were released until the 1970s. Since then the company was acquired by several hobby manufacturers and production rate declined. In the 1990s, the brand was acquired by J. Lloyd along with Lindberg and revived under the brand name Testors. Today the brand is owned by Round 2 and they produce aircraft model kits as well as 1/6 scale automotive engines.

=== Johnny Lightning ===
Johnny Lightning brand was established in 1969 and sold by Topper Toys until when it ceased its production in 1971. The brand was revived by Thomas E. Lowe in 1994, who founded an umbrella company Playing Mantis. In 2004, Lowe sold Playing Mantis to RC2 which was formed by Ertl and Racing Champions. RC2 was then sold to Tomy in 2011. Subsequently, in 2013, Tomy discontinued Johnny Lightning brand. In 2016, Round 2 LLC bought the rights for Johnny Lightning from Tomy and the brand was revived again.

=== Lindberg ===
Lindberg brand was founded in the 1950s, succeeding O-Lin which was specialized in flying "stick and tissue" aircraft models. Lindberg produced molded plastic aircraft kits, plane models of all kinds, battleships and aircraft carriers. They also produced automotive kits of many sizes including 1:8, 1:24, 1:32, and 1:64. This continued until the 1980s. In the 1990s, George Toteff of MPC acquired Lindberg and started producing 1:20 and 1:25 scale car kits. In the 2000s the brand was obtained by J. Lloyd along with Hawk model kits. Several years after, the brand was acquired by Round 2 along with Hawk.

=== MPC ===
MPC, a long-running model kits brand, was first established in 1963 by former employees of AMT. The brand was owned by The Fun Group since the 1970s. It was bought by Ertl in the mid-80s after the acquisition of AMT. Ertl considered MPC supplementary to AMT and the MPC products were gradually replaced under the AMT brand name. After Ertl was purchased by Racing Champions which were focused on diecast model, MPC was sold to Round 2. MPC brand was revived as a stand-alone line under Round 2 in 2008. MPC toolings were purchased outright in 2012.

=== Polar Lights ===
Polar Lights was a model kit brand founded in 1996 by Thomas Lowe under his Playing Mantis, with toolings acquired from Aurora model company. Aurora model company produced pop-culture oriented model kits such as Universal Monsters. Polar Lights succeeded this and obtained a Star Trek license in 2003. Since then it established a position as a model kit manufacturer of vehicles appearing in Star Trek franchise. It was absorbed into RC2 after Playing Mantis was sold to the company in 2004. Thomas Lowe signed an agreement to use Polar Lights brand under Round 2 in 2008, along with AMT and MPC. Full rights to Polar Lights were acquired in 2012.

=== Racing Champions ===
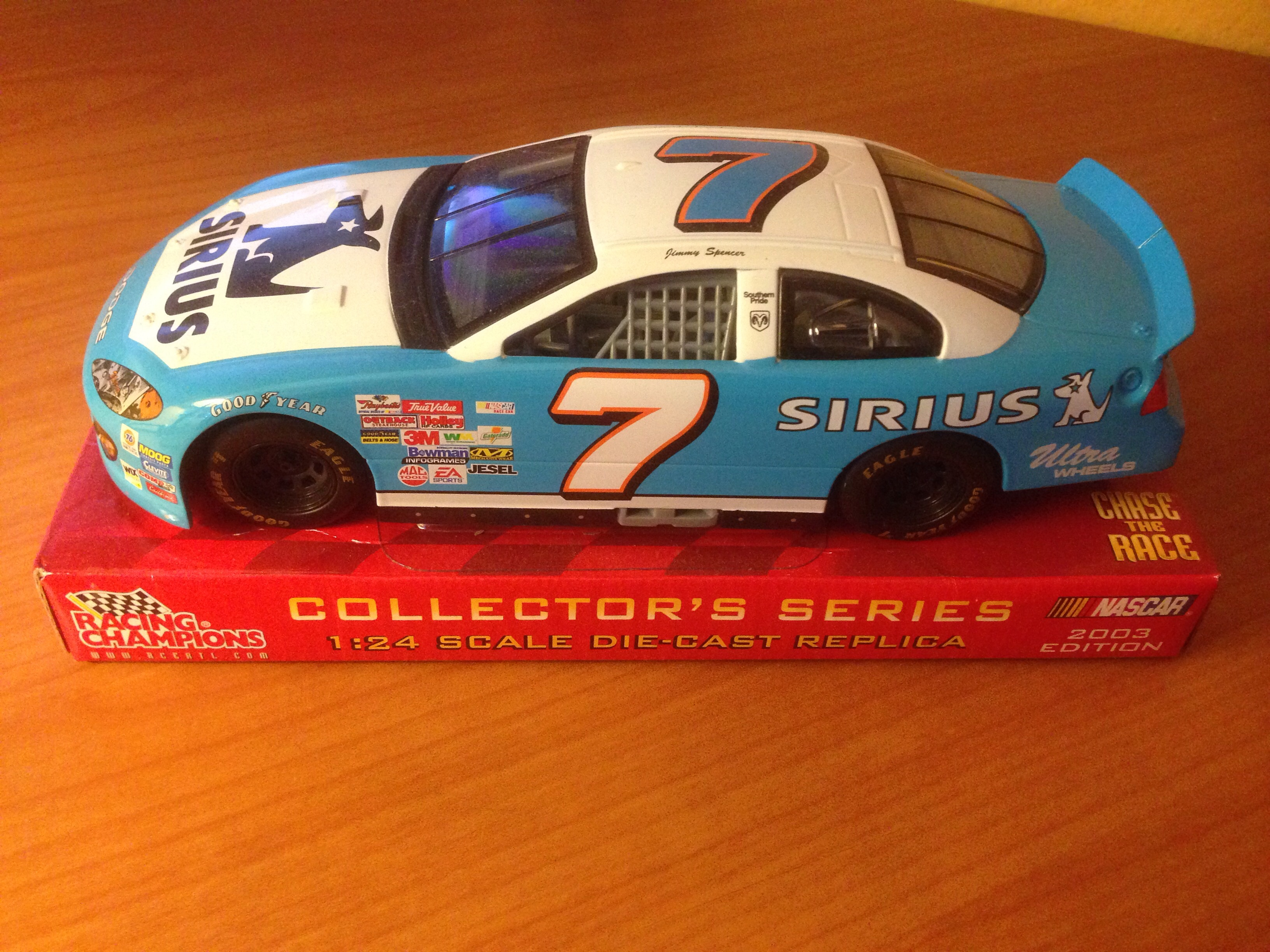
A 1:24 scale model of a NASCAR racecar by Racing Champions

Racing Champions was a diecast company founded by Glen Ellyin based in Illinois. Since obtaining NASCAR license in 1991–92, Racing Champions went through success in the 1990s by manufacturing diecast models of stock cars in various scales such as 1:18, 1:24 and 1:64. They also produced non-racing vehicles through Racing Champions Mint line, which was considered the most detailed 1:64 scale diecast model during the time. Racing Champions purchased Ertl in 1999 and changed its name to Racing Champions Ertl. Under this new enterprise, they released a premium 1:64 diecast series Ertl American Muscle in 2000. Racing Champions Ertl and its successor RC2 was bought by Tomy in 2011. In 2015, Round 2 obtained the rights to produce and market Racing Champions brand and reintroduced the toolings formerly used under Racing Champions Mint as well as Ertl American Muscle.

=== List of brands by Round 2 ===
- American Muscle
- AMT
- Auto World
- Forever Fun
- Hawk
- Johnny Lightning
- Legends of the Quarter Mile
- Lindberg
- Lionel, LLC (March 2026)
- Mini Metals
- MPC
- Polar Lights
- Racing Champions
- Silver Screen Machines
- Vintage Fuel
