= Hawk Model Company =

American scale model manufacturer

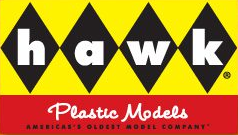
- Founded: 1928; 98 years ago in Chicago
- Founder: Dick Mates; Phil Mates
- Defunct: 1970
- Fate: Acquired by Testors in 1970, then defunct, became a brand
- Headquarters: Chicago, U.S.
- Products: Scale model aircraft, ships, figures
- Owner: Round 2
- Website: round2corp.com/hawk

The Hawk Model Company is an American brand and former manufacturing company of scale model airplanes, ships, and figures, established in 1928. Headquartered in Chicago, Hawk was one of the first American manufacturers of injection-molded plastic model kits.

After some attempts to revive the brand, rights to Hawk Model were finally acquired by Round 2.

== History ==
"Hawk Model Airplanes" was established in 1928 by brothers Dick (Sr.) and Phil Mates in Chicago, Illinois. Promoted as "America's Oldest Model Company", the company was purchased by the Testor Corporation in 1970. The Hawk Company assets were later acquired by J. Lloyd International, Inc. of Cedar Rapids, Iowa, which, in turn, sold them to Round 2 LLC of South Bend, Indiana in 2013.

From its inception in 1928 to the early 1950s, the company manufactured a successful line of solid-wood aircraft models, which eventually included injection-molded generic plastic propellers. The Mates brothers exhibited built-up and painted plastic models at the Chicago World's Fair in 1934. During World War II, Hawk helped to supply plastic identification models for use in military training.

In 1946, Hawk produced one of the first all-plastic model kits, the Curtiss R3C-1 racer. Four additional kits (all classic 1930s racers) were added in 1948; the Gee Bee, Howard Ike, Laird Solution and Supermarine S6B. These early kits were molded in acetate plastic, but from 1949 Hawk employed polystyrene in its injection-molding process. The kits were advertised as "1/4 scale", meaning 1/4 inch (0.64 cm) equals 1 scale foot or 1/48 scale. Additionally, increasingly sophisticated tooling was developed in the 1960s. By the time of its sale to Testor Corp. in 1970, the company's catalog included a wide range of realistic scale replicas of aircraft, ships, missiles, vehicles and conceptual subjects in 1:48, 1:72, 1:96, 1:144, and smaller scales.

== Product lines ==
Among Hawk's most notable releases are:

- LZ 127 Graf Zeppelin (Note: In 1:245 scale, when finished, this kit measured 38.5 inches long.)
- Lockheed Constellation (Note: The company's first polystyrene kit)
- Lockheed U-2 (Note: In 1:48 scale, one of its most popular and accurate examples - based on the Garry Powers-flown variant.)
- Spirit of St. Louis 1:72
- Messerschmitt Me 163 (Note: 'Komet' German Interceptor)
- Gee Bee (Note: Gee Bee racer. The original 1948 tooling was still being re-boxed by Testors Corp. into the early years of the 21st century.)
- Spad XIII (Note: World War I-era biplane.)
- Mister Mulligan (Note: Benny Howard racer.)
- Travelaire Mystery Ship racer
- Grumman F8F Bearcat
- North American P-51 Mustang
- Vickers Viscount (Note: 735 Series in Capital Airlines markings (1/96 scale) - later re-issued by Glencoe Models.)
- Manned Orbiting Laboratory (Note: Conceptual space model.)
- 3 Rocket-Powered Guided Missiles

Many of these original Hawk kits have been reissued periodically using the original molds. They have been reboxed by Testor or its successors and continue to be available.

=== Weird-ohs ===
One of Hawk's best selling kit lines was the "Weird-Ohs Car-icky-tures", dragster and hot rod caricatures (along with the related "Frantics", and "Silly Surfers" series), based on concepts and art created by their often-used freelance illustrator Bill Campbell. This model line serve as the inspiration for the 1999-2000 CGI cartoon series Weird-Ohs.

==== Weird-Ohs characters ====
- Daddy - The Way Out Suburbanite (racer; aka. "the Swingin' Suburbanite"), also known as Toilway Daddy; issued in the UK by Airfix under license
- Davey - The Way Out Cyclist (outlaw motorcycle club rider: "He's a Psycho cyclist! This cat's a terror on the road...")
- Digger - The Dragster (racer)
- Drag Hag - The Bonny, Blastin' Babe (racer)
- Endsville Eddie - The Shortstop Stupe (racer)
- Freddy Flameout - The Way Out Jet Jockey (test pilot), issued in the UK by Airfix under license
- Huey's Hut Rod - The Way Outhouse Bomb (racer)
- Sling Rave Curvette - The Way Out Spectator (race fan)
- Wade A. Minut* - The Wild Starter (race 'official'; aka. The Timeless Timekeeper)
- Francis the Foul - The Way Out Dribbler (basketball player)
- Killer McBash - The Dazzling Decimator (football player)
- Leaky Boat Louie - The Vulgar Boatman (motorboater)

==== Silly Surfers characters ====
- Beach Bunny ("Beach Bunny Catchin' Rays")
- Hodad Makin' the Scene ("Hodad Makin' the Scene With a Six Pack - Detailed Personable Pelican and Crusty Crab, Insect Pests, Sand Crawlers, Etc., included")
- Hot Dogger Hangin' Ten
- Riding Tandem ("Hot Dogger and Surf Bunny Riding Tandem - The Dazzling Duo of the Surf - Goony Gull, Crusty Crab & Friendly Fish included")
- Woodie on a Surfari

==== Frantics characters ====
- Frantic Banana (drummer: "Frantic Banana Punishing The Skins - car plugs not included in this kit")
- Frantic Cats (dancers: "Shifty Snuffling at its best - This is the Livin' end!")
- Steel Pluckers (guitarists: "Bopped out Steel Pluckers having A Bash - the twangin' and sangin' stars of the Sappy Swingin Sixties")
- Totally Fab (guitarist & groupie: "...Screamin' Meemies Two Legged Model of Fort Knox & Security Guard")
