= Johnny Lightning =

Brand of scale model cars

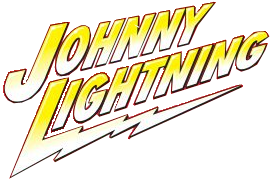
- Product type: Diecast model cars
- Current owner: Round 2 (2016–)
- Produced by: Round 2
- Country: United States
- Introduced: 1969; 57 years ago
- Related brands: Hot Wheels
- Markets: Worldwide
- Previous owners: Topper Corp. (1969–71); Playing Mantis (1994–2004); RC2 (2004–11); Tomy (2011–13); Round 2 LLC (2016–present)
- Registered as a trademark in: United States
- Website: johnnylightning.com

Johnny Lightning is a brand of diecast model cars launched in 1969 by Topper Corporation (owner of the "Topper Toys" brand), similar to the hugely successful Mattel's Hot Wheels cars. They were notable at the time for being extremely fast compared to other brands of die-cast cars. Their most important technology was to mold in a small hook under the front axle so that they could be propelled by a lever-driven catapult, far faster than could be obtained by either gravity, or battery powered "supercharger" devices.

Al Unser Sr. won the Indianapolis 500 in 1970 and 1971 in the "Johnny Lightning Special". Topper closed in 1973 and production of Johnny Lightning cars ceased for 23 years. The company made a total of 47 different models.

In 1994, Thomas Lowe of Cassopolis, Michigan became aware of the abandoned trademark and secured the rights to the Johnny Lightning name for his Playing Mantis toy company. He made replicas of his favorite 10 original Johnny Lightning cars. His first customers were Walmart and Toys "R" Us.

Playing Mantis produced the toy cars under the Johnny Lightning brand name from 1994 to June 2004. Over 600 different models, including replicas of all of the original 1969-71 cars, were produced over that time period.

In 2004, Lowe sold Playing Mantis (including the Johnny Lightning brand) to RC2 Corporation, which in turn was bought by the Japanese toy company Tomy in 2011. Tomy discontinued the Johnny Lightning line of diecast cars in 2013. The brand continued to maintain a following by a loyal group of collectors. In early 2016, Round 2 LLC, a toy company owned by Thomas Lowe (who also owned Playing Mantis), revived and reintroduced Johnny Lightning vehicles to the toy market for a second time.

== Topper ==
In 1969, Topper Corporation (owner of "Topper Toys" and other brands) introduced Johnny Lightning model cars and track sets in response to the growing 1:64 scale diecast market. New Jersey inventor and author Henry Orenstein owned Topper and is responsible for their creation. Johnny Lightning introduced 11 cars and several hard plastic sets that year. Topper based all but one car, the Custom Turbine, on real cars of the period. Flexible plastic track was also sold, as well as accessories like a loop-the-loop and curved sections. In addition, Topper sold a Johnny Lightning helmet and carrying case.

For 1970, Johnny Lightning introduced 31 new models, mostly based on fantasy vehicles. Seven of the new models were "Jet Power" cars. These cars contained a plastic bladder which could be filled with pressurized air that, when released, sent the car speeding down the track. Topper also produced numerous new track sets for 1970.

Johnny Lightning sponsored five Parnelli Jones cars, including Al Unser, in the 1970 and 1971 Indy 500 races. Unser was able to capture those victories in his blue lightning bolt decorated Johnny Lightning Special. After the initial 500 victory, sales of the Johnny Lightning cars increased dramatically, from initially having sales falling far behind that of Mattel, to selling one Johnny Lightning to every three Hot Wheels cars.

Only five new models were introduced for 1971, all part of a series called "Custom Cars". Each came packaged with plastic snap-on parts so children could customize the cars to their liking. By the end of 1971, Topper was forced to close due to business fraud which brought an end to the Johnny Lightning cars.

== Playing Mantis ==
Thomas Lowe and his Playing Mantis company acquired the rights to the Johnny Lightning trademark and started producing reproductions of the original cars in 1994. This was about the same time that Hot Wheels introduced a "Vintage" line of cars that were reproductions of original 1960s designs. Sales were hugely successful as his first customers were Walmart and Toys R Us.

The full line of Johnny Lightning cars produced by Topper and Playing Mantis is described in the Standard Catalog of Diecast Vehicles.

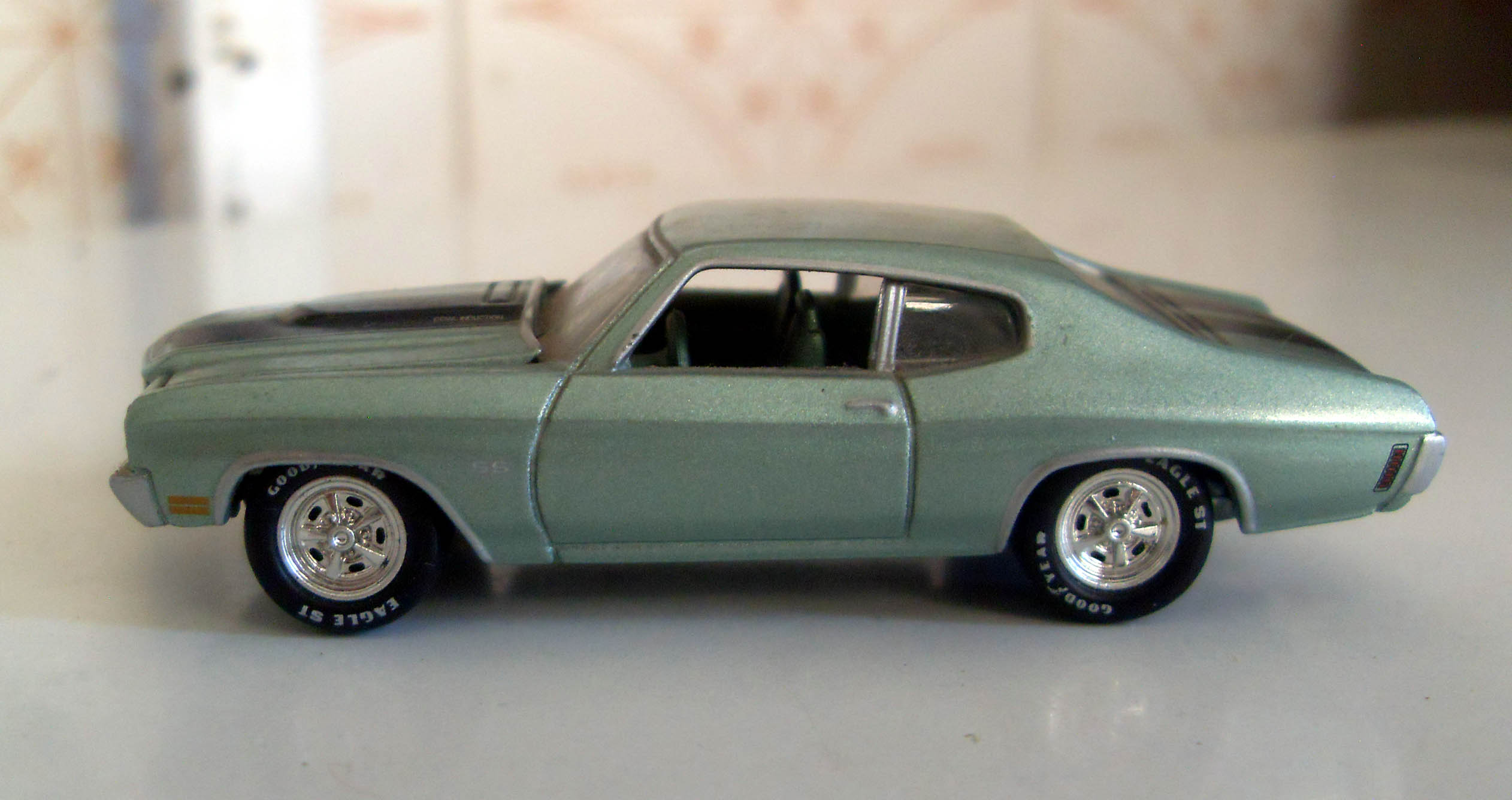
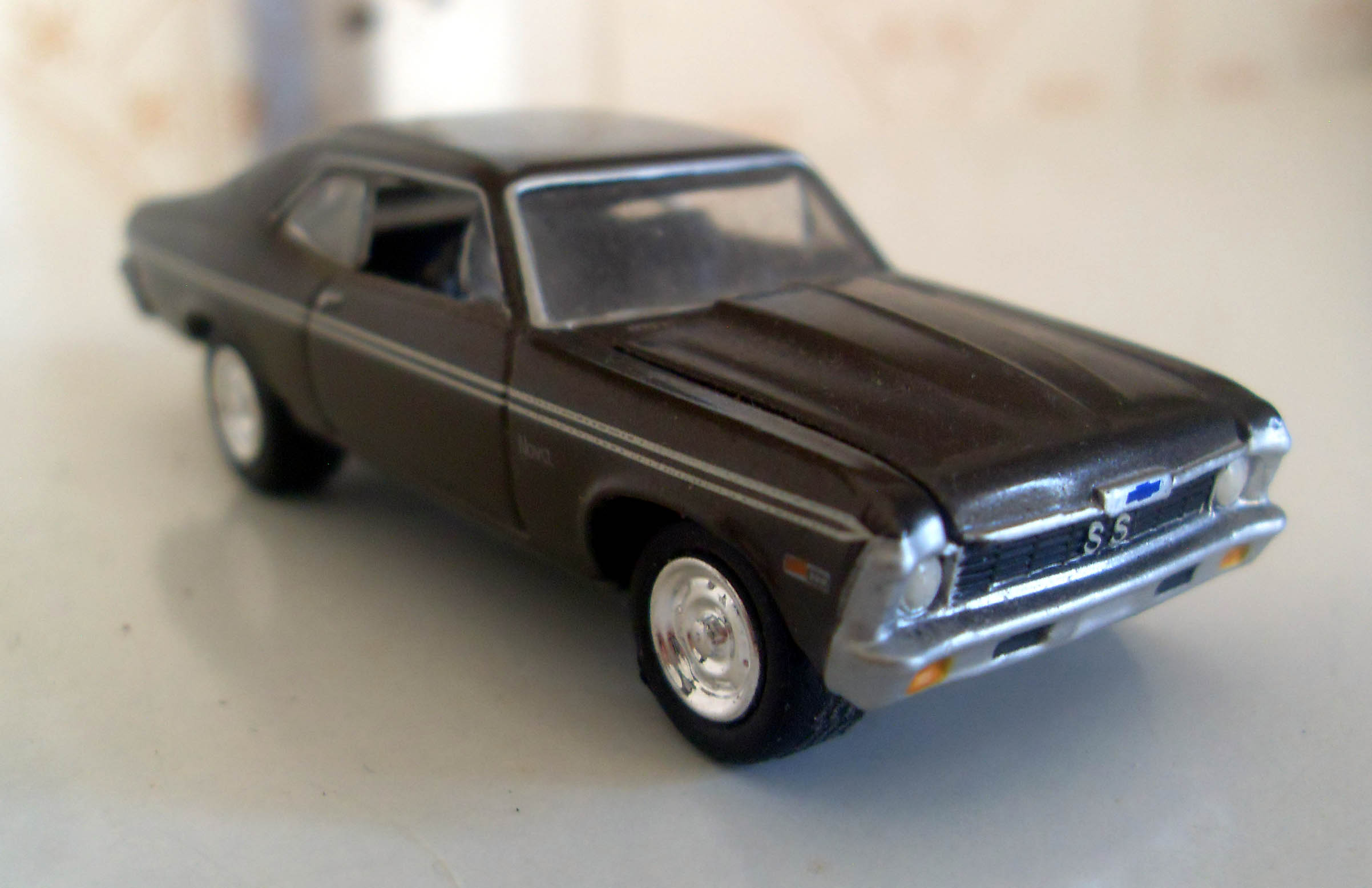
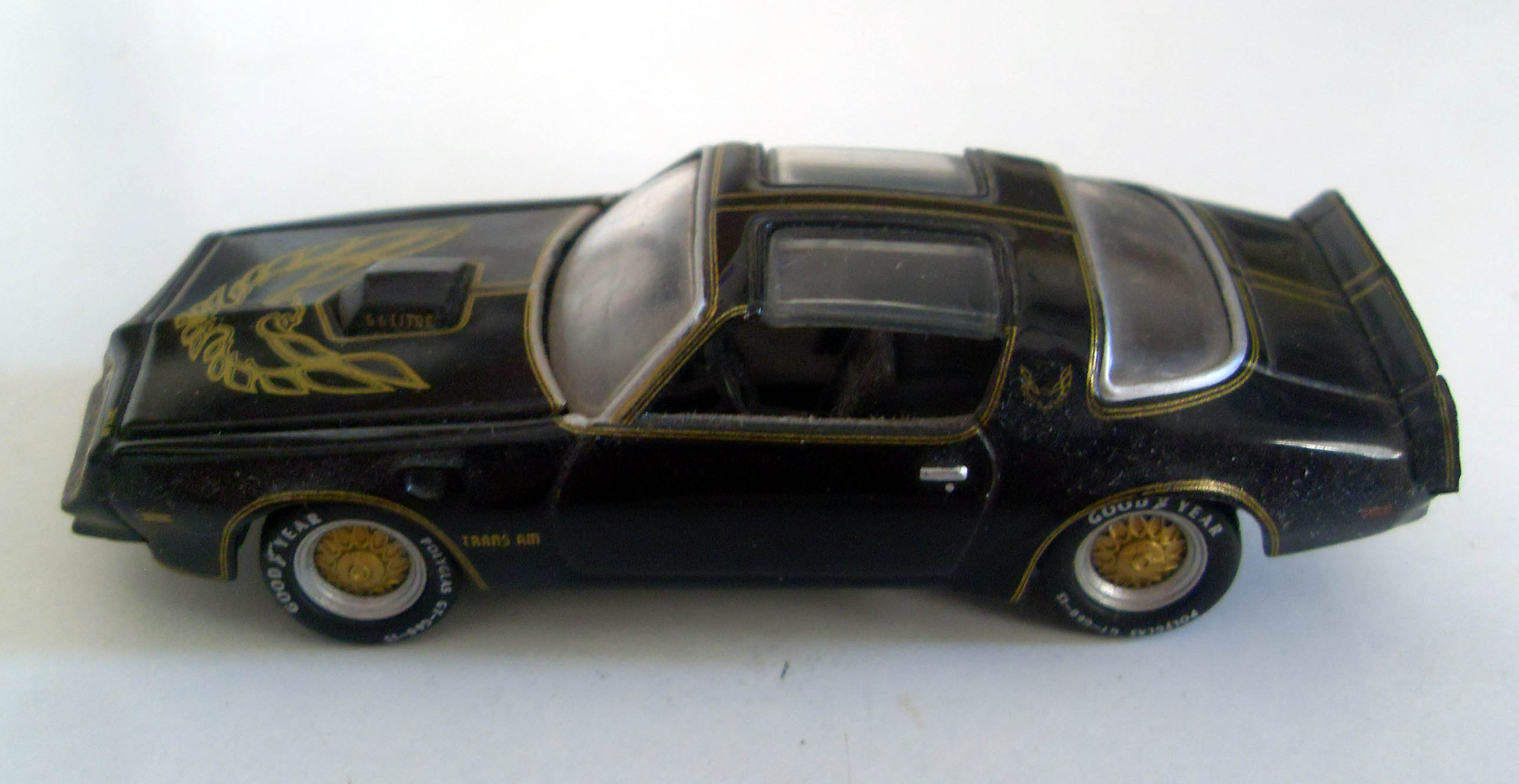
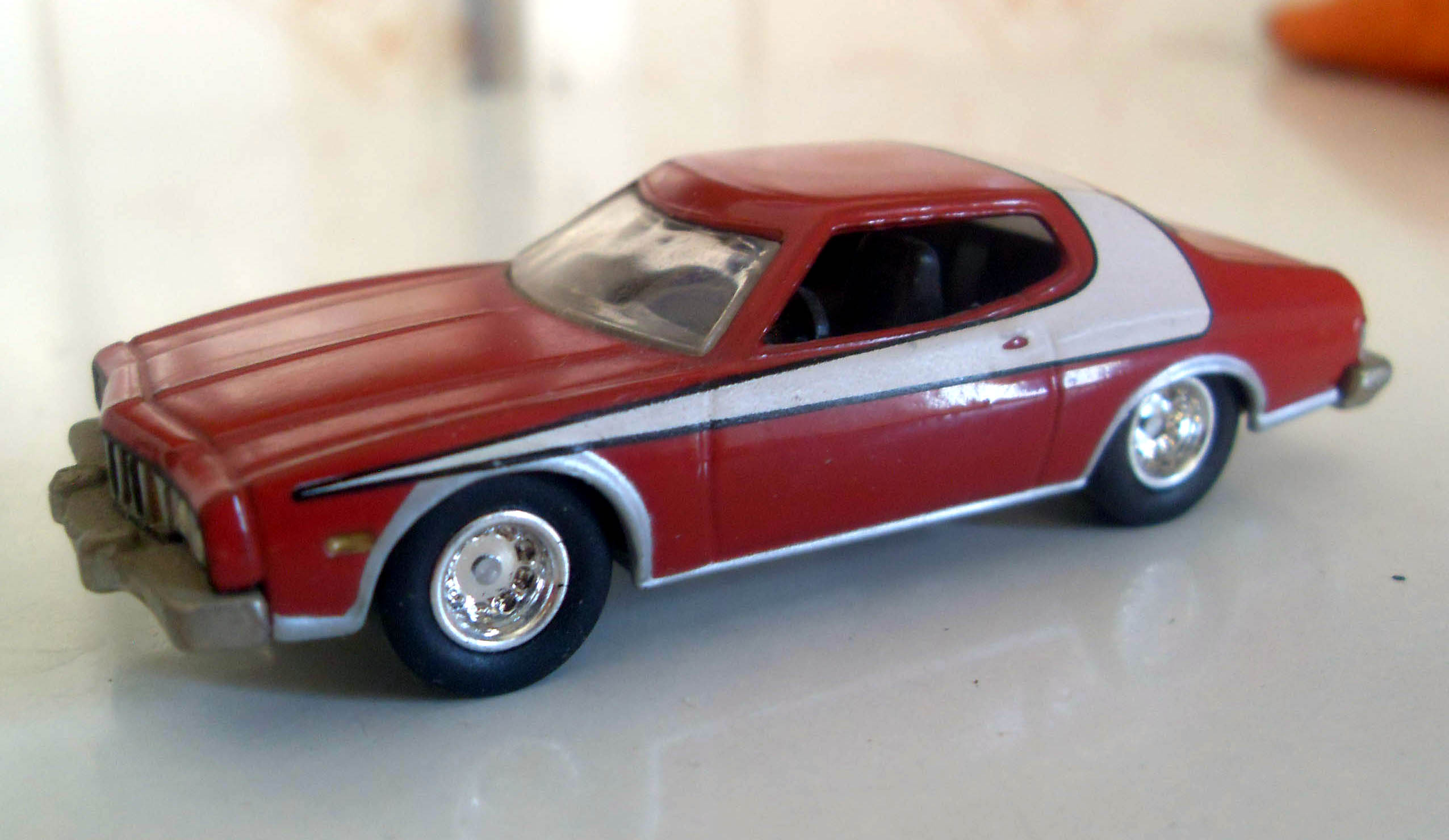
Four models from the Playing Mantis era, fltr (above): 1970 Chevrolet Chevelle, 1968 Chevrolet Nova; (middle): 1978 Smokey and the Bandit Pontiac Trans Am, 1975 Starsky & Hutch Ford Gran Torino

Playing Mantis also revived the Thunderjet 500 line of slotcars, sharing their name with Johnny Lightning in 1/64 scale. They commenced by selling the bodies that came on a toy Chassis with pull back action. Pulling the car backwards wound a spring. After releasing the car, it ran forward on energy stored in the spring. Their early cars Copyright 1999 (11, referenced from the product package) were reproductions of some of the original Thunderjet 500 car bodies and new models, including a new 1971 Z-28 Camaro. The bodies could be easily removed and put onto the original Thunderjet 500 and Tuff Ones chassis. Playing Mantis added more pullback cars with bodies that were exact fits to the original Aurora AF/X chassis. Racers of the Aurora cars welcomed the reproductions and new models as the bodies could be modified for racing without altering an original body. Common modifications included cutting the mounting posts to lower the body, (Lowering the car's center of gravity) and enlarging wheel wells to allow the use of wider tires.

Playing Mantis brought back the pancake motor buy equipping the bodies with a reproduction of the Aurora Tuff Ones chassis. Aurora updated it with wider rear tires, independently rotating and wider spaced front wheels, and a faster pancake armature. These cars copyright 2001 - 2004 (12 referenced from the product package) continued with the shared names Thunderjet 500, Tuff Ones, and Johnny Lightning. The new chassis had parts interchangeable with the original Aurora Tuff Ones.

2003 brought on the release of another line of cars. These shared the names X-Traction and Johnny Lightning with a reproduction chassis that was part for part compatible with the Aurora AF/X magnetraction chassis and pancake motor. This chassis had thicker motor magnets that expanded down into openings in the bottom of the chassis, bringing the motor magnets closer to the metal electrical rails in the track. The magnets pulled the car down to the track rails to give the tires more traction, giving the car more speed and higher speed cornering. Some racers liked the faster speed, while others preferred driving the non-magnetraction cars. When driving the non-magnet cars too fast into a curve the rear end of the car drifted around the corners before reaching the point of spinning out or crashing off the track, leaving the driver a danger zone they could drive hard into. The magnetraction cars did not have this drift and the driver had no warning they were in the danger zone before they suddenly lost traction and crashed.

== RC2 ==
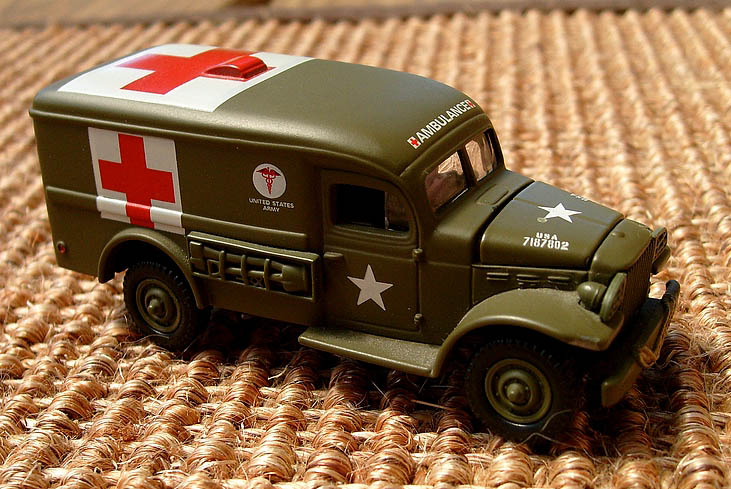
Dodge military ambulance

In 2004, Playing Mantis was bought by RC2 Corporation and Playing Mantis disappeared. Johnny Lightning products were then produced and distributed by RC2 in Oak Brook, Illinois, a suburb of Chicago. RC2 started as Racing Champions and produced NASCAR die-cast models. Carrying over from the Playing Mantis era was designer and author Mac Ragan who was responsible for many of the popular models and had written a comprehensive guide to Johnny Lightning cars called Tomart's Price Guide to Johnny Lightning Vehicles (2001). Ragan and Tom Lowe were inducted into the Diecast Hall of Fame in 2010.

In 2005 RC2 brought in a popular automotive and die-cast designer, Eric Tscherne. Tscherne previously worked for Mattel's Hot Wheels brand and Jada Toys. Tscherne was inducted into the Diecast Hall of Fame in 2011.

Johnny Lightning received a major overhaul of its image in 2006. A new clamshell style package arrived stores in January 2007 with the release of the new Johnny Retro series. A new logo treatment was also introduced and the logo and package design were products of a partnership with Design Force and directed by Tscherne among others. Additional overhauling of the brand included updating many of the long-time collector favorite series like Classic Gold and Muscle Cars which received new packaging graphics developed in the West Coast office by Jeremy Cox and Tscherne. A large price increase coincided with the new package, leaving many collectors upset with RC2's management and decision making associated with the beloved Johnny Lightning brand. In September 2007 Mac Ragan left RC2 for Greenlight Toys. Tom Zahorsky remained the Johnny Lightning design manager until RC2 discontinued production in 2013. Zahorsky no longer works for RC2/Tomy.

For a time, Johnny Lightning vehicles were sold by Learning Curve Inc., formerly known as RC2. In 2007 Johnny Lightning expanded to offer more than just adult collectibles by introducing Battle Wheels. Battle Wheels is a line of remote controlled robots that battle one another. They also introduced the world's first transforming RC vehicle the V_BOT.

== Tomy ==
In 2011, the Japanese toy company Tomy bought RC2 Corp., acquired the Johnny Lightning line, and for a while sold Johnny Lightning cars in the U.S. with the TOMY logo on the packages. However, in 2013 Tomy Toys announced it would no longer produce the Johnny Lightning brand and it was discontinued.

== Round 2: Johnny Lightning relaunch ==
In January 2016, three years after its second disappearance from the market, the Johnny Lightning die-cast brand was relaunched once again by Thomas Lowe and his Round 2 toy company which also produces the Auto World and Racing Champions brands of die-cast cars. Although Johnny Lightning cars are now made by Round 2 (under license from TOMY International), the Playing Mantis logo returned to the front of Johnny Lightning packaging for continuity with the previously produced Playing Mantis Johnny Lightning cars. In addition, Tom Lowe hired four original Playing Mantis designers to work on the Johnny Lightning line: Tony Karamitsos, Mike Groothuis, Mac Ragan, and Scott Johnson (of Pitcock Design).
