= British Radio Car Association =

British hobby association

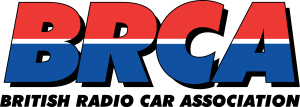
- Sport: Radio controlled racing
- Jurisdiction: United Kingdom
- Abbreviation: BRCA
- Founded: 1971
- Affiliation: Motor Sports Association
- Regional affiliation: EFRA
- Headquarters: Stafford, Staffordshire
- Chairman: Darren Newton
- Secretary: Kenneth Rogers

Official website
- www.brca.org
- Other key staff: Darren Worth (Vice Chairman) Jim Spencer (Treasurer) Mark Christopher (Membership Officer) Chris Boden (Safeguarding Officer)
- (United Kingdom)

The British Radio Car Association (or BRCA) is an organisation that promotes the construction and racing of all types of radio controlled cars in the United Kingdom. Founded in 1971 by Ted Longshaw and Keith Plested, who was also the founder of PB Racing, a manufacturer of RC cars; they coordinate BRCA affiliated clubs in the UK, and offer insurance for any accidents that might occur.

They also organise regional and national racing events for various classes. Each year the BRCA produces a rules booklet for every UK racing class, such as 1:10 Electric touring cars, 1:8 Nitro circuit cars and 1:16 Electric micro offroad cars with specific rules as regard to maximum and minimum dimensions, and homologated motors and cells. It is recommended (and at some clubs compulsory) to become a BRCA member due to its insurance and health and safety benefits.

The BRCA is a member of the European Federation of Radio Operated Model Automobiles (EFRA).

The BRCA is also affiliated with the Motor Sports Association who deal with motorsports in the UK, although deal primarily with full-size racing rather than scale model racing

== Objectives of The British Radio Car Association ==
As outlined in the constitution of the BRCA their objectives are:

- To promote the construction and competition of radio-controlled cars.
- To facilitate the exchange of information and ideas relating to the sport.
- To set rules and standards for construction and racing.
- To encourage National and International competition within a co-ordinated calendar.

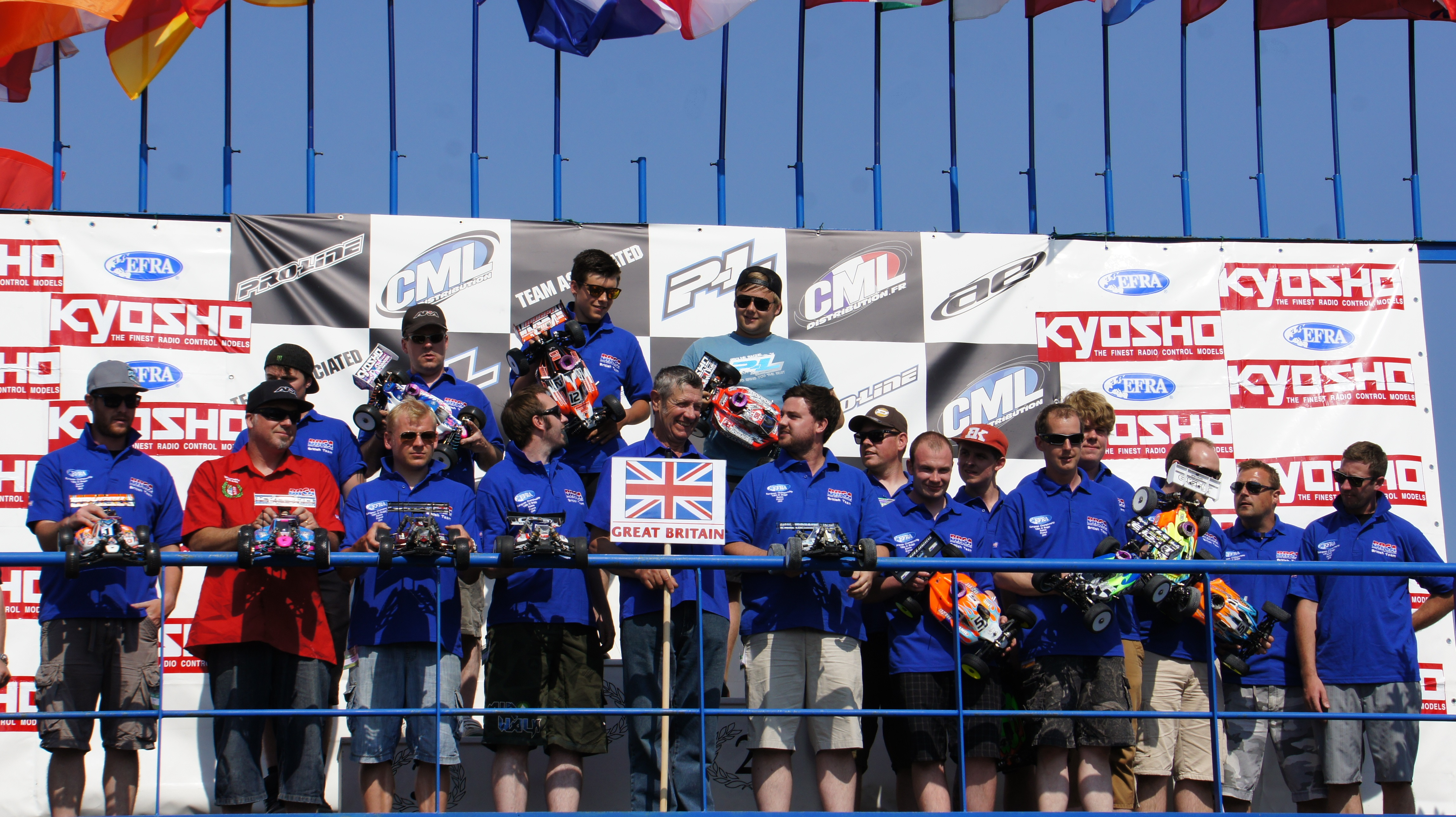
BRCA representatives at the 2013 EFRA 1/8 Off-Road Championship

== Sections within the BRCA ==
The BRCA is made up of 13 sections, each section maintain and hold their own construction rules for the classes they race:

- 1/10th Electric Circuit including Formala 1
- 1/8th Scale Circuit
- 1/12th Scale Circuit
- 1/8th Scale Rally X
- 1/10th Electric Off Road
- Various Scale Stock Cars
- 1/10th Scale IC Circuit
- 1/5th Scale Circuit
- Various Scale Bikes
- Large Scale Off Road
- 1/12th carpet oval
- 1/18th Scale Micro Cars
- Various Scale Truggy

== Committee ==
=== Chairman ===
#	Name	Term
1.	Ron Moody	1973–?
2		–
3		–
4	Chris Hardisty	1989-2015
5	Dave Waters	2015–2018
6	John Russell	2018–2019
7	Darren Newton	2019–

== Major hosted events ==
1987 IFMAR 1:10 Electric Off-Road World Championships

1993 IFMAR 1:10 Electric Off-Road World Championships

1998 On-Track98 held in South Shields IFMAR 1/12, 1/10 (Pro10) and Touring Car World Cup

2016 First Reedy International 1/12 Race of Champions at centre:mk Milton Keynes

2017 First GT12 Worlds held at centre:mk

2020 IFMAR 1/12th World Championship at centre:mk Milton Keynes
