= Herpa Wings =

German manufacturing company that makes Scale-model-aircraft

- Product type: Scale model aircraft
- Current owner: Herpa
- Country: Germany
- Introduced: 1992; 34 years ago
- Website: herpa.de

Herpa Wings is a brand that identifies the die-cast model aircraft line of German company Herpa. The collection includes 250 airlines under 17 different aircraft manufacturers in 1:200 scale. The mainstay of Herpa Wings is in the 1:500 scale, while model airliners are also produced in the 1:400, 1:200, 1:1000, and 1:160 scales. Herpa Wings model airliners may also be used in conjunction with Herpa's SCENIX series, which includes model diorama airports and airport accessories.

Herpa Wings has also produced model aircraft for many of the world's international airlines, which include Singapore Airlines, Cathay Pacific and others. These model aircraft are then sold exclusively by the airlines on board and are not included in the regular retail collection.

== History ==
=== 1949 ===
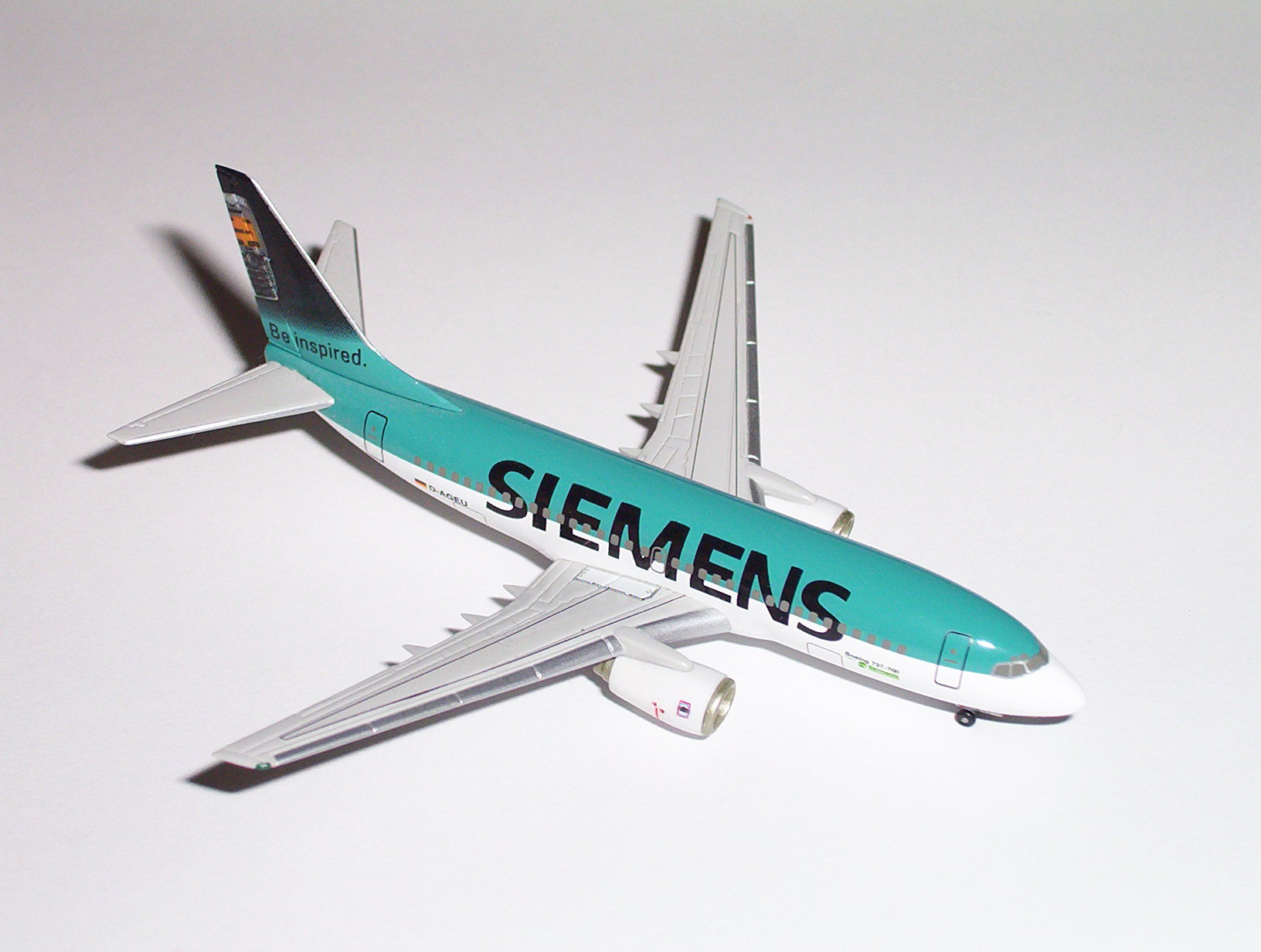
A 1:400 scale model of a Boeing 737-700 of Germania in a Siemens Electronics logojet.

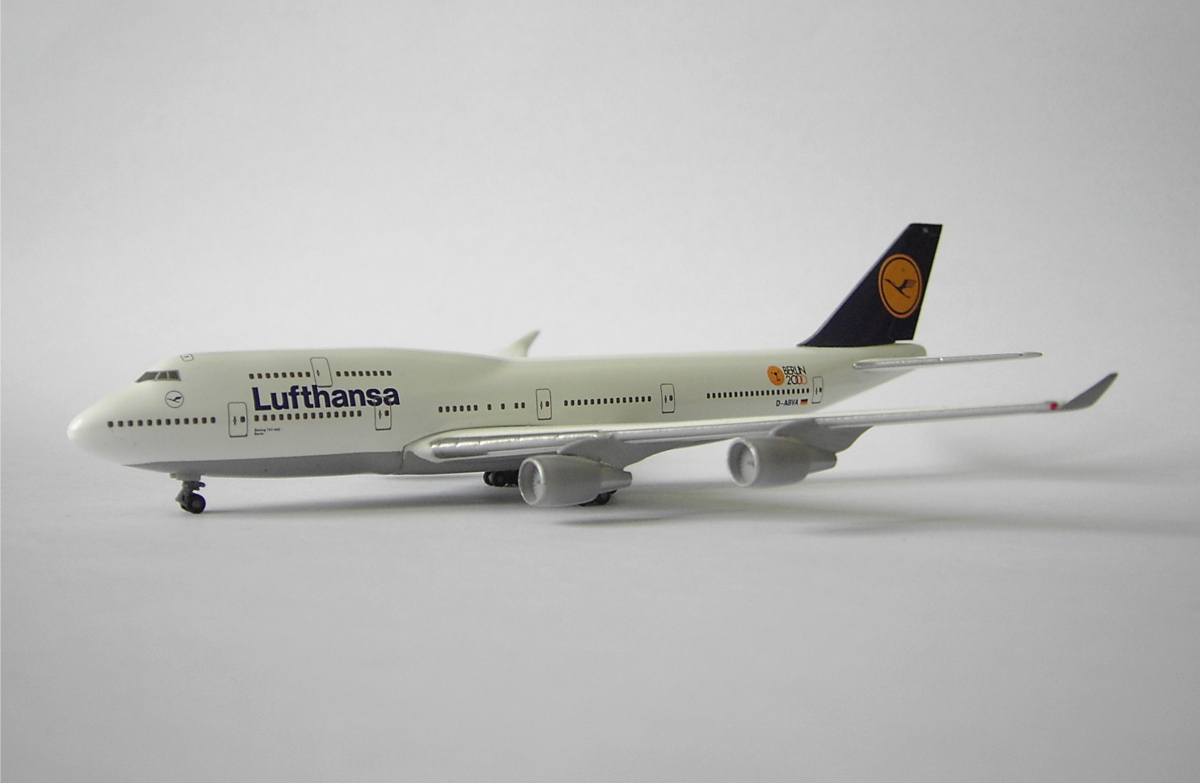
A 1:500 scale mode of a Lufthansa Boeing 747-400.

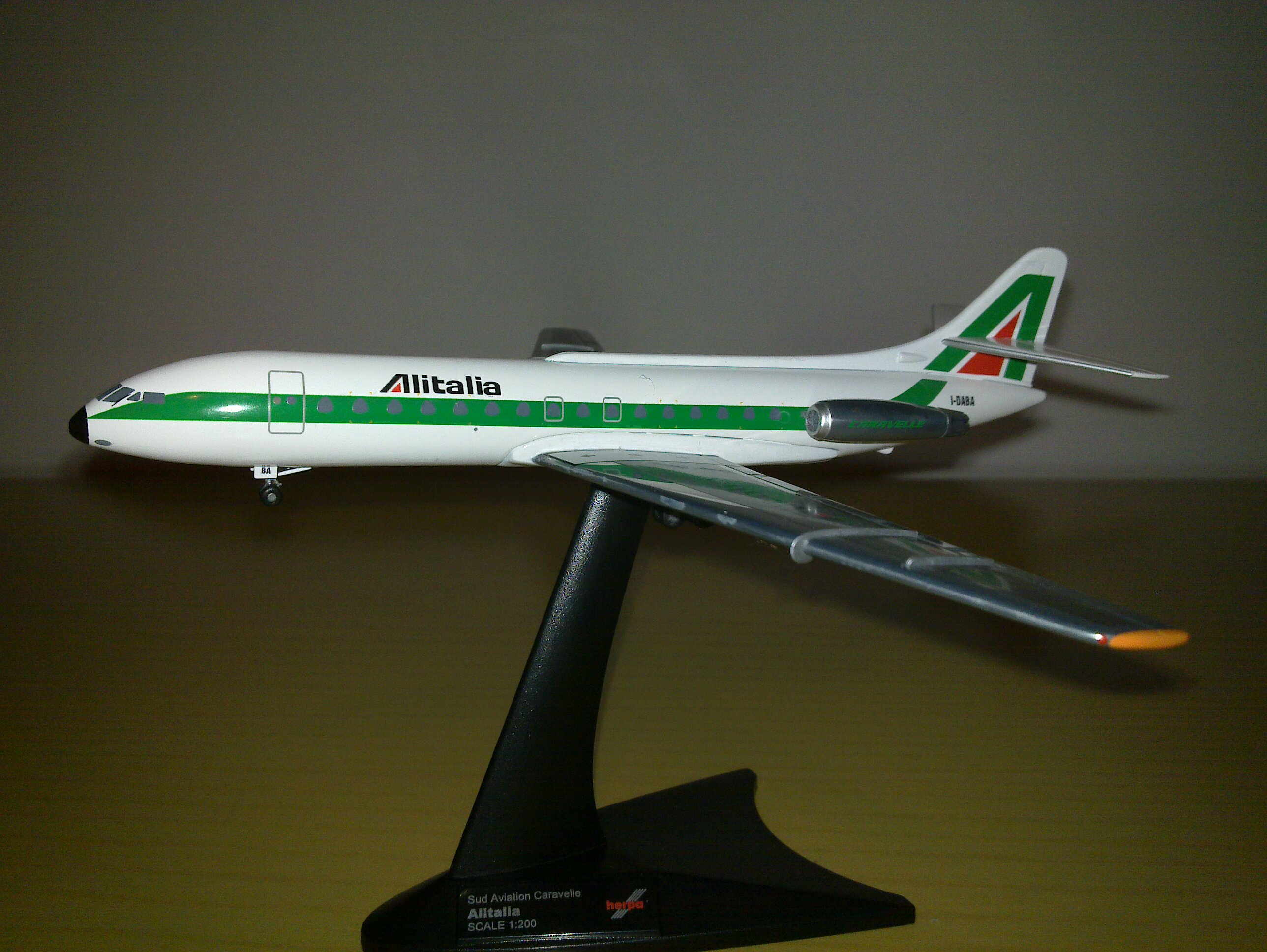
A 1:200 scale model of a Sud Aviation Caravelle in Alitalia livery.

The company Hergenröther Patente was founded in Nuremberg by inventor and patent holder Wilhelm Hergenrother to produce accessories for model trains. The initials of the company's name make up the word Herpa.

From 1949 to 1987, Herpa had been focusing exclusively on its Cars & Trucks range. However, the first plastic samples of Boeing 747-200s in the 1:00 scale were produced for Lufthansa at an initiation ceremony for a Boeing 737-300 at Nuremberg Airport. Lufthansa then ordered from Herpa the production of the Lufthansa Model-Edition in the 1:200 scale exclusively for the airline.

In 1988, Herpa launched the Lufthansa Model-Edition with a highly detailed replica of the Boeing 737-300. Plans for historical models like the Junkers Ju 52 were also in development. With the advent of computer technology, in 1989 a partner company in Asia developed a new concept that would be able to create the same detail and precision available to the smaller 1:500 airplane models.

In 1990, the model airplanes sported authentic miniaturizations of the engines and rolling landing gear from the various manufacturers. By 1992, Herpa Wings is established. The first 1:500 scale plane miniatures are presented to the public at the Nuremberg Toy Fair, and several airlines place orders for planes in their respective liveries.

A licensing contract with aircraft manufacturer Boeing was signed in 1995. In 1996, Herpa Wings offered propeller driven planes for the first time with the release of an ATR-72 model. Also, Herpa Wings produced for Condor the replica of their anniversary plane, the "Rizzi Bird", which is still one of the most difficult models in the Herpa Wings range. The first set of airport accessories was also produced.

In 1997, issue 1 of the magazine for collectors of airplane models, WingsWorld, is released in June. A new range of airplane replicas in the 1:200 scale are released. In 1999, the Herpa Wings Club and the first models of airport buildings in the 1:500 scale are produced. Herpa also celebrates its 50th anniversary in 1999.

In 2005, Herpa Wings introduced the MAGIC Collection featuring model aircraft in the scale 1:600, aiming to directly contend with at the time direct competitor Schabak. In September, a 1:1000 scale Airbus A380 model was also released. In 2006, the 1:1000 scale series of models were officially launched. The SCENIX range of airport accessories and dioramas were also introduced.

== Hogan Wings ==
Hogan started as a separate brand formed in Hong Kong, but were bought by Herpa as a cheap option. Hogan models are made in 1:200, 1:400, 1:500 and 1:1000 scale. All Hogan 1:200 Models are snap-fit but detailed down to the landing gear.

== Herpa Wings Club ==
The Herpa Wings Club was established in 1999 in conjunction with Herpa's 50th anniversary. Currently, members receive WingsWorld, a magazine for collectors of Herpa Wings. A free annual model in the 1:500 scale is also given, with options to purchase 4 exclusive models from the Club Edition. Members to the Club also enjoy discounts at the Herpa museum shop in Dietenhofen, Germany. The annual Herpa Wings folders are given free to members as well.
