= Trax Models =

- Type: Private
- Industry: Diecast models
- Founded: 1986
- Headquarters: Silverwater, New South Wales, Australia
- Key people: Frank Tregellas & Robert Hill
- Products: Model cars and buses
- Parent: Top Gear Pty Ltd
- Website: topgear.com.au

Trax Models is a range of diecast model cars and buses in the scales of 1:24, 1:43 and 1:76 produced by Trax Corporation Pty Ltd. The line consists of vehicles made in China for the Australian market. The company is controlled by the Australian firm Top Gear, but the Top Gear name does not appear on Trax vehicles nor boxes. The company was formed in 1980, by John Eassie, initially involved with Australian model trains. Eassie branched off into 1:43 diecast cars in 1986, with car models being distributed via the model train retailers. Eassie sold the company to Frank Tregellas, previously General Manager of Matchbox Toys Australia and Matchbox Collectibles and Robert Hill who managed Matchbox Collectibles.

== Model series ==
Most Trax models are cast in 1:43 scale and are replicas of Australian vehicles. Details are accurately rendered. The standard Trax car range, normally labeled as "Trax Australian Motoring History" on the boxes, includes GM Holden (FJs, Monaros, Toranas, Commodores, etc.), Ford (early Fairlanes, but mostly Falcon variations), and Chryslers (mostly Valiants and Valiant Chargers). Early models were often more sporty vehicles but later the company became quite prolific, making saloons, utes, race cars, taxis, and all sorts of liveried vehicles. Top Gear also produces the 1:43 scale Opal Series which features vehicles with opening doors, opening bonnet and boot lid. Opal models come in premium packaging.

The Select Series are 1:43 scale limited production resin models made to order and specifically tailored to cover less-common or more exclusive models where multiple versions of each in diecast would be impractical. An example of this is the Leyland P76 Force 7 Coupe. Leyland Australia only made ten, which were used for journalists and display purposes for the 1974 Melbourne Motor Show. The resin models allow for a greater level of detail unattainable in diecast.

Superscale is Top Gear's venture into the 1:24 scale market where larger versions of Australian cars are handmade containing over 200 pieces. These models include opening doors, bonnets and boot lids, working steering. Some models even have working window winders allowing the door windows to be wound up or down.

Top Gear has recently entered the world market by creating the Legends Series which are models of vehicles that have been driven, ridden or flown by Australian race drivers over the years. The first model made was Jack Brabham's Formula One winning car, the Brabham BT19 V8. These models also have the added benefit of each being numbered and hand-signed by the Legend himself. The current Legend Series model is the Honda NSR500 ridden by World 500cc Grand Prix Champion Mick Doohan. Again, each model is numbered and individually signed by Doohan, and are officially licensed by Honda in Japan.

== Model details ==
Trax models of the standard line are finely diecast, with accurate details, and paint mimicking factory colors. Model bodies are a single casting and the standard series features no opening parts. Door, bonnet and boot seam are done crisp, clean and deep - they often look like they open when they do not.

Logos, scripts, turn signals, light lens colors, door handles, trunk locks, window vents and window trim are all accurately painted or have realistic tampos. For example, the Falcon XC Cobra has realistic blue paint stripes with the Cobra snake logo on the side of each front fender. Headlights and other lenses are often made realistically using clear plastic. The Valiant Charger has multi-hued rear tail lights, that blend from orange out to red. Body proportions of Trax Models are spot-on. Model wheel designs match those of the actual cars and tires are made of rubber.

Model bases are normally diecast metal and are painted black. Decal sheets are sometimes supplied (say, for racing versions) and Trax has even gone to the trouble of re-issuing corrected decal sheets where necessary. Some suspension and exhaust detail is shown for the chassis, but it is not exceptional. Some cars feature screws holding base to body while others are riveted.

== Trux line ==
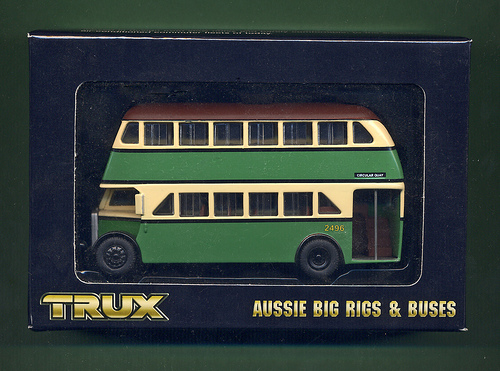
An AEC Regent III double decker bus model in the Trux line

Top Gear's model buses and trucks are marketed under the Trux name. These are buses, trucks, fire engines and construction vehicles made for Australian roads or with Australian liveries. Many of these models are manufactured from dies directly commissioned by Trax. Other models are sourced from dies held by Exclusive First Editions (EFE).

Buses reproduced are the 1920s and 1930s Leyland Titan double deckers, 1940s vintage Leyland Tiger, AEC Regent III double decker, an AEC Regal III single deck, a 1950s Ansair Flxible Clipper, an IBC, a Mercedes-Benz O305, a 1950s Daimler CV single deck, a Denning double decker, a Denning Monocoach, a Denning Denair, a Leyland Atlantean double decker and a Leyland National from the 1970s.

Various fire trucks like the 1940s Chevrolet Blitz were offered. The Blitz and others were also offered in military camouflage form. Some buses and trucks represented New Zealand lines and liveries.

== Marketing and packaging ==
The customary early Trax box design for the standard series through the mid-1990s was yellow with black and white and red highlights, somewhat like a 1990s interpretation of an old Corgi or Dinky box. The Trax logo was black with letters outlined in white with a red pennant proclaiming "Australian Motoring History". Each panel was then outlined with a fine red line. The model was illustrated on the side with no plastic window. Vehicle information with a small outline map of Australia was on the opposite panel.

Since 2004, boxes incorporated a perspex plastic window and had perforated top flap for retail hanging. Colors on the boxes were presented diagonally progressing from dark blue to yellow.

All models are produced in limited quantities and never reproduced. As such, previous offerings now sold out generally increase in value over the years with some early limited examples now worth many times their original purchase price. Excess, returned or damaged models are sold through the Trax Wrecking Yard.

Top Gear is the only diecast model company in Australia to produce a regular catalogue every two months, and a hard cover book detailing every model ever made by Top Gear which is updated every three years. The book has received positive independent review. New additions to the Trax range are often recognised in the local Australian media.

Trax supports a collector's club that has started a model selection process where members can vote on the next model they want to see produced. For A$120 members get a vote and receive the winning model when it appears.

Promotional and other models are also produced under the Top Gear name, like the gray Holden FJ panel newspaper delivery van advertising The Sun - Daily at Dawn, Melbourne Australia's newspaper. Proclaiming News and Pictorial, the van's doors showed the headline Olympic Torch Arrives. This van was part of a series of at least six devoted to Australian newspaper liveries. A similar series was FJs at Work which advertised different home appliance companies like Malleys, Hotpoint, Metters and Simpson. To enable use with many promotions, boxes were decorated generically with newspaper graphics, with none prominent. Stickers were added to the boxes to identify the paper highlighted on the van.
