= Diecast Collector =

British hobby magazine

- Cover to the edition of Sep 2008
- Categories: Hobby
- Frequency: Monthly
- Publisher: Warners Group Publications
- Founder: Mike Forbes
- First issue: 1997; 29 years ago
- Country: UK
- Based in: Bourne
- Language: English

Diecast Collector is a British magazine dedicated to the hobby of collecting diecast metal vehicles. Published monthly, it is a thick, glossy magazine featuring a variety of articles on toy and model cars, trucks, and buses, and aircraft. Beyond information on the collectables themselves, the magazine is also a source of hobby information such as auction results, collectors' fairs schedules, specialized dealer information, etc.

The magazine also issues a yearly price valuation book.

== Overview ==
The magazine was founded and edited by Mike Forbes, a well-known collector who formerly edited trucking magazines. Regular contributors have included Malcolm Bates, Mike Pigott, Horace Dunkley, and Andrew Ralston. Popular columns include the Matchbox "Models of Yesteryear" series by Horace Dunkley, the amusing 'Drive-Past' column by Brian Gower, and regular features on Hot Wheels, Matchbox Superfast and character toys by Mike Pigott. Every issue includes up-to-date news on the model industry, plus reviews of the latest diecast and white metal releases.

Diecast series covered in the magazine include Matchbox, Corgi, Dinky, Hot Wheels, Lone Star Toys, Norev, Ixo, Kenner, Exclusive First Editions, and Johnny Lightning. Articles based on TV, film and comic book character have included Batman, Spider-Man, Looney Tunes, Star Trek, The Magic Roundabout, James Bond, The Simpsons and The Green Hornet.

In October 2007, Diecast Collector celebrated its tenth anniversary with a special issue in which columnists and readers discussed their favourite diecast models from the past decade.

In 2010, Forbes was replaced as editor by Denise Burrows, who also edited companion magazine Collectors' Gazette. Rick Wilson was editor from July 2013 to January 2016, being replaced by Tim Morgan later that year. Rick Wilson returned as editor in September 2018, a position he still holds. During his second stint, Wilson authored and edited the specialist Fast and Fifty publication, celebrating the 50th anniversary of Matchbox Superfast.

Diecast Collector is published monthly by Warners Group Publications of Bourne, Lincolnshire.

== Regular contributors ==
- Mike Pigott
- Andrew Ralston
- John Kinchen
- Roger Wynn
- Paul Bason
- Roger Bailey
- David Boxall
- Chris Sweetman
- John Kinchen (died 2015)
- Stephen Paul Hardy
- Keith D'Souza

== Special offers ==
In the January 2006 edition, a special offer was included in the magazine offering a model Oxford Mini Van from Oxford Diecast for £1 to cover postage. Demand exceeded the five thousand pieces that were originally produced and an additional one thousand models had to be made to be shipped several months later.
