= Jada Toys =

American scale model manufacturer

Jada Toys, Inc.
- Type: Private
- Industry: Consumer products
- Founded: 1999; 27 years ago
- Founder: Jack Li; May Li
- Headquarters: City of Industry, CA, U.S.
- Key people: Bill Simons (CEO)
- Products: Scale model cars, figures, radio controlled models, dolls
- Parent: Simba Dickie Group
- Website: jadatoys.com

Jada Toys, Inc. is an American manufacturer of collectible scale model cars, action figures, radio controlled model vehicles, and dolls. It was founded in 1999 by Jack and May Li. Jada's products are predominantly aimed at the collectible market, and are available and popular at retail outlets worldwide.

The company has or has had license rights to market products from a wide range of entertainment companies and franchises as well as sports associations, including Disney, Marvel Comics, Looney Tunes, DC Comics, NASCAR, NBA, WWE, Fast & Furious etc.

== History ==
Founded by Jack and May Li in 1999, Jada's first toy was a 1:24 scale die-cast 1953 Chevrolet tow truck, part of their Thunder Crusher line. Though the Chevrolet tow truck toy and other lines proved successful, the company remained in obscurity until the introduction of the urban-themed DUB City brand. Launched in collaboration with DUB Magazine in 2002, the line presents officially licensed vehicles with custom rims, lowered ride height and special in-car entertainment systems. Dubs, so named for their 20-inch or bigger wheels, are among the company's best sellers and the most visible in retail outlets.

The company launched the DUB City spinoff Chub City in 2005. Targeted at a younger generation of collectors, the line included heavily stylized vehicles and a story told through webisodes and comics. The human characters featured in the story inspired toys of their own. By 2007, the line had done over $12.5 million in sales and was featured in a Burger King kids meal promotion. In 2009, Jada sold the brand to Dentsu Entertainment; who, in conjunction with Fuel Entertainment and Nelvana, planned on launching a $15 million 52-episode animated series in late 2015. At the time of the sale, Chub City toys had sold over 20 million units.

Branching out of automotive licensing, in 2008 Jada Toys teamed up with Activision to release the Guitar Hero Air Guitar Rocker. The toy consists of a belt buckle, a portable speaker and two guitar picks. Waving the pick near the buckle lets the user play air guitar to one of ten songs (five licensed tracks) such as Black Sabbath's "Iron Man" and Boston's "More Than A Feeling." Two cartridges that add additional songs were also released.

In 2011, Jada entered the girls category when it received a license to produce Hello Kitty play sets and remote-controlled cars. This was followed up with the company's own line of fashion dolls called Cutie Pops in 2012 and the RC line GirlMazing in 2014.

Jada became the master toy licensee for the RoboCop reboot in 2013. In 2014, the company gained the rights to produce vehicular toys based on Jurassic World and the Fast and Furious series.

2016 saw the introduction of the Metals Die Cast line of figures. Based on various licensed entertainment properties, Jada offers the line in 2", 4" and 6" scales. The company planned to release over 150 Metal Die Cast products in its first year.

On January 29, 2019, the company was acquired by Simba Dickie Group.

== Products ==
=== Own products ===
- 10th Anniversary
- Badge City Heat
- Battle Machines (Note: Die-cast cars from and inspired by the battle car themes.)
- Big Time 4Wheelin
- Big Time Muscle (Note: American Muscle Cars receiving the Pro-Touring treatment.)
- Big Time Kustoms
- Buddy The Dog
- Chub City
- Collector's Club
- Cutie Pops
- D-Rod$ (Note: Jada Toys' take on classic Hot Rods of the 1920s, 1930s and 1940s.)
- Donk, Box & Bubble (Note: American cars with oversized wheels, raised ride height and special paint jobs.)
- DUB City
- DUB City: Euro Spec
- For $ale (Note: Classic and modern cars in faux dusty, unrestored condition.)
- Garage Worx
- GirlMazing: Radio Control
- Hero Patrol: Precincts
- High Profile (Note: DUB City-treated pickup trucks and SUVs.)
- Hollywood Rides
- Homie Rollerz
- Hot Rigz
- Hyper Chargers RC
- Hyper-Spec
- Import Racer! (Note: Customized Japanese sports cars.)
- JDM Tuners
- Just Trucks
- Kustom Kings (Note: Classic 1950s cars inspired by George Barris's custom designs.)
- LOPRO
- Metals Die Cast
- Metal Formz
- Metalfigs
- Nano Metalfigs
- Nexgen Muscle
- Next Level
- NYPD
- Option D! (Note: Customized rear-wheel drive and all-wheel drive sports and race cars from and inspired by the Formula D Championship Series.)
- Pink Slips
- Road Rats
- Road Rigz (Note: Custom Peterbilt 379 trucks with brand sponsored haulers.)
- Showroom Floor (Note: Classic and modern cars in their unmodified form.)
- Snap & Build
- Street Low (Note: American Lowrider cars.)
- Snap Shots (Note: 1:64 scale cars packaged in mini-dioramas.)
- Thunder Crusher
- VDub$ (Note: Customized Volkswagen cars.)

=== Licensed ===
In addition to Jada's own lines, the company also produces a wide range of branded toys and diecast products based on various movies, TV Shows, sports leagues, comics, games, and characters.

- 2006 Chevrolet Camaro Concept (Note: Painted yellow with black stripes, similar to Bumblebee from the Transformers film. Also from 2009 they offered an exclusive Corvette Stingray Concept)
- Assassin's Creed
- Avengers: Age of Ultron
- Batman v Superman: Dawn of Justice
- Back to the Future
- Captain America: Civil War
- Chop Socky Chooks
- DC Comics
- Deadpool
- Disney
- Disney Parks
- Doctor Strange
- Donkey Hodie
- Fast & Furious
- Ghostbusters
- Guardians of the Galaxy
- Guitar Hero
- Halo
- Hello Kitty
- Initial D
- Iron Man
- Jake and the Never Land Pirates
- Jurassic World
- Knight Rider
- Looney Tunes
- Marvel Comics
- Marvel Super Hero Squad
- Mega Man
- Mickey Mouse Clubhouse
- Minnie Mouse Mow-Tique
- Miles from Tomorrowland
- Minecraft
- Mortal Kombat
- NASCAR
- National Basketball Association
- Pixar
- Power Rangers
- Realtree
- Reservoir Dogs
- RoboCop
- Scarface
- Sofia the First
- Speed Racer
- Spider-Man
- Star Trek
- Street Fighter
- Stranger Things
- Suicide Squad
- Teenage Mutant Ninja Turtles
- The Avengers
- The Godfather
- The Little Mermaid
- The Walking Dead
- The Sopranos
- Transformers
- Von Dutch
- Wonder Woman
- World Wrestling Entertainment
- X-Men
