= Siku Toys =

Toy vehicles manufacturer based in Germany

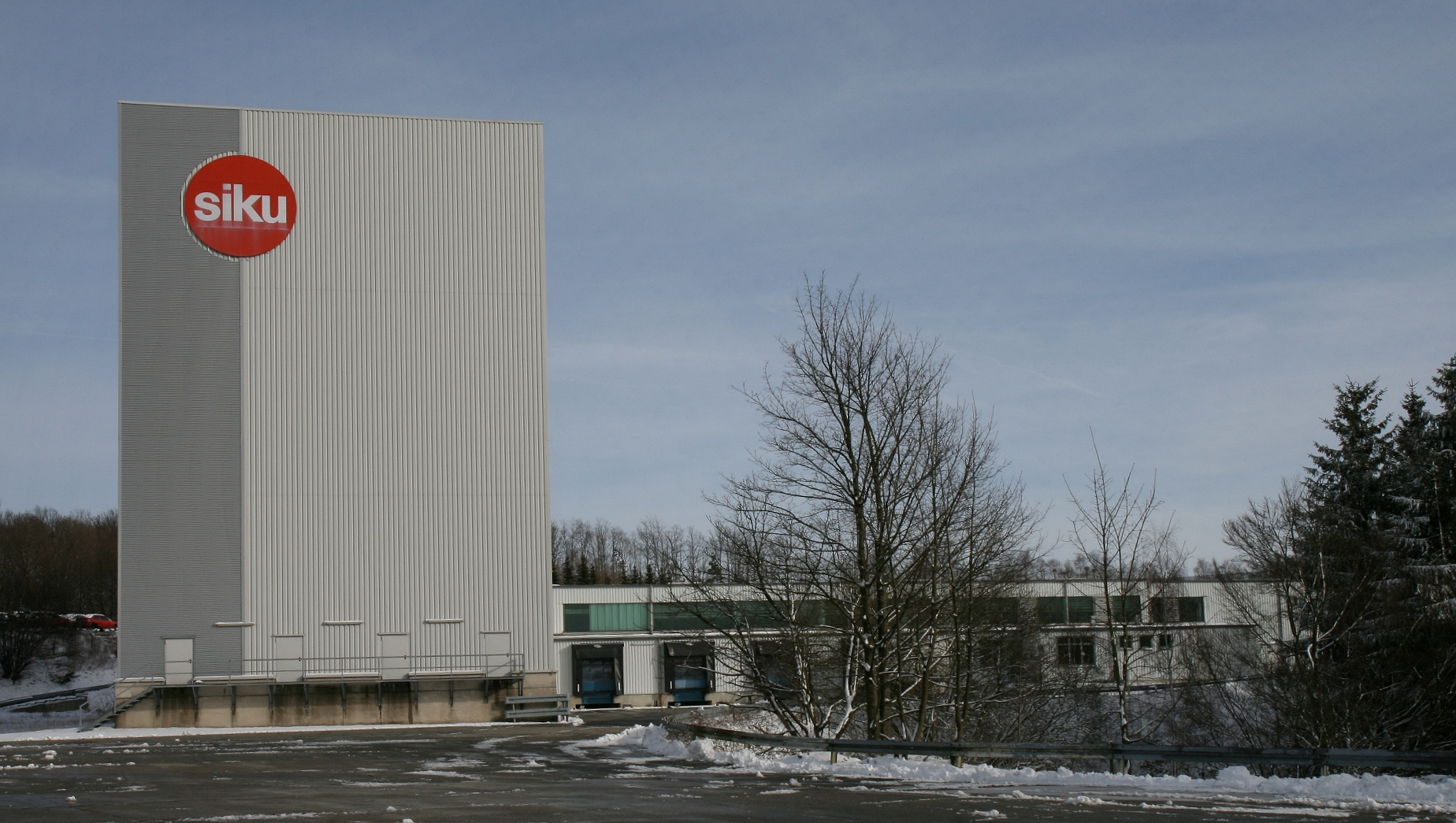
- Siku headquarters in 2008
- Founded: 1921; 105 years ago
- Founder: Richard Sieper
- Headquarters: Lüdenscheid, Germany
- Products: Figurines, plastic scale model cars, aircraft, commercial vehicles, agricultural machinery
- Website: siku.de

Sieper Lüdenscheid GmbH & Co. KG, mostly known by its trade name Siku, is a German manufacturer of scale models headquartered in Lüdenscheid. Some of the products sold by Siku are model cars, figurines, model aircraft, model commercial vehicles, and model agricultural machinery. Traditionally, production was centered in Lüdenscheid, but diecast models are now made in China, the Philippines, Poland, Taiwan and Vietnam.

== History ==
Founded in 1921, Sieper-Werke (Sieper Works) was originally a manufacturer of metal tools and cutlery in zamak and aluminium; later on, it also made ashtrays, badges, medals, belt buckles, and buttons. Its factory in Lüdenscheid was outfitted with new casting moulds in 1949 for grating, sandblasting and painting cast zinc goods. The company was even contracted to make Mercedes-Benz's star-shaped hood ornament.

Sieper-Werke also experimented with early plastics. In 1943, it expanded to a facility in Hilchenbach, about 50 kilometres (30 mi) from Lüdenscheid (though the latter remained Sieper-Werke's headquarters), in which products like plastics, furniture, mirrors, and cabinets were developed and manufactured. Its Lüdenscheid operations generally focused on promotional items for major brands, such as the 'elephant shoe' and 'Zeller black cat', which were injection-moulded.

It was not until 1950 that the company started producing toys in Lüdenscheid, registering the "Siku" trademark for the new products. The name originates from abbreviating the name of the founder of the company, Richard Sieper, and the German word for plastic, Kunststoffe (i.e. Sieper Plastics). Originally, there were a broad variety of Siku toys which at first were plastic, including figures and animals. These were often called 'margarine figures' because they came in margarine packages as a food promotion. The success of the plastic figures gave Siku capital to start a line of postwar vehicles.

Between 1951 and 1955, the first vehicles were generic representations of a fire truck, a race car, an amphibious truck, a moving van, and finally, in 1955, a Porsche 356. The scale chosen was approximately 1:60. By 1958, Sieper-Werke had dropped figures to focus exclusively on plastic vehicles, except where animals attended tractors and such.

In 1994, Siku Toys purchased the Gama Toys after its company closure and absorbed it into Siku Toys. According to an archive of the official Siku website in 1998 (December 6, 1998 on archive.com), it is highly likely that production at that time took place at "Industriestr. 1-3, 12099 Berlin-Tempelhof-Schöneberg".

== Model series ==
Siku's primary offering is the 1:55 scale "Super Series" line of model vehicles, which can be seen as roughly equivalent to Matchbox vehicles. The company also owns the well known HO scale manufacturer Wiking Modellbau.

=== V-Series ===
==== Plastic models ====
In 1955, the first dedicated line of vehicles, the V-Series (V for "Verkehrsmodelle" or "Traffic Models"), was produced. It consisted of plastic replicas of actual vehicles in a uniform 1:60 scale. Colors were often dull and rather pastel. Vehicles were well-proportioned and detailed, like the Magirus fire truck with a whole series of ladders, a very detailed electric street car, or some figures like the drivers in the Mercedes 190, Porsche 550 Spyder, or Karmann Ghia convertibles. One particularly sharply detailed model was V228, an all-plastic Willys Jeep with trailer, which featured a detailed driver and folding windshield.

Most vehicles did not have interiors, with the exception of convertibles or the double-decker bus. Some of the Mercedes-Benzes even had hood ornaments.

Several American cars were also offered, including a 1956 Buick Century, a 1957 Mercury Voyager station wagon, and a 1960 Chrysler New Yorker.

==== Metal models ====
In 1963, 12 new V-Series models produced in zinc alloy and spray-painted by hand were introduced. Between 1963 and 1969, new releases were made in both plastic and metal, but there was a gradual shift to metal models with fewer plastic ones. The last plastic model was issued in 1969, and since then, all new models have been die-cast zamac. Similarly to Corgi or Dinky vehicles, Siku vehicles also used rhinestones for headlights, which were attractive but not very realistic.

Most V-series vehicles came packaged in cardboard boxes bearing the words "Siku-Flitzer" ("Siku Speedster"), with vehicles illustrated on opposite panels. Different colors were also shown on the opposite panels; some boxes were blue and red, some green and yellow, and others orange and cream. The style was somewhat reminiscent of early Solido boxes. This packaging was used until rather late and seemed rustic compared to other companies' use of modern clear blister packs, which had become dominant by this time (even being used by Matchbox). For some time, the illustrations of the vehicles on the boxes were bathed in a yellow light from the round sun-like Siku logo.

One notable example was a Ford F-500 flatbed "dually" truck made in the mid-1960s. Proportions were realistic and colors were authentic-looking. The grille was also authentically detailed with jeweled headlights. The wheels were done in a utilitarian black, detailed, but with no chrome. One model offered a dark green body, brown interior, and a red metal chassis.

In 1973, the letter V was removed from the numbering system.

The V Series came to an end in 1975 when the Super Series was introduced.

=== Aircraft ===
Sieper-Werke first built 20 aeroplane models in scale 1:250 in 1959. Despite good sales, production ended in 1964 due to the lack of a sufficient workforce. In the early 1990s, aeroplane models of this size reappeared. They were boxed and were in the price range 19.de.

=== Super Series ===
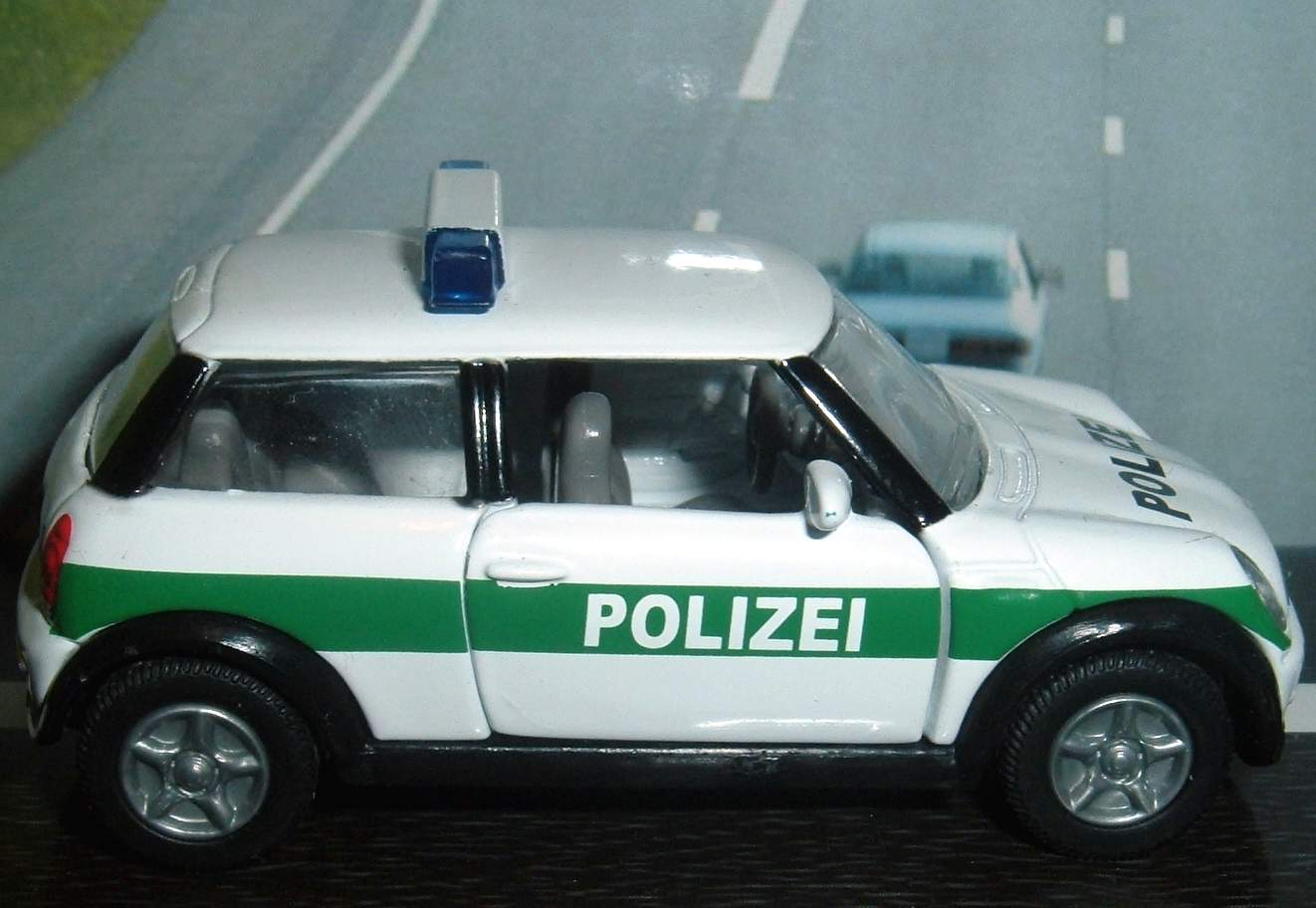
A police Mini Cooper with 5-spoke wheels

The Super Series replaced the V-Series, becoming the principal model range. Some V models were transferred to the Super Series and renumbered, but there were two differences between the new series and the old. First, the models were no longer spray-painted by hand. Second, the new models were made in a slightly larger scale of 1:55. Models were now numbered according to a four-digit system, with the first two digits designating the price bracket. Small cars traditionally had numbers that started in 10 or 13, but later on, 08 and 14 were added. Larger vehicles, including helicopters, have various price range designations from 16 and up. The second two digits are the model numbers within each price bracket. This uniform numbering system has since been applied to all new product ranges as well as to gift sets.

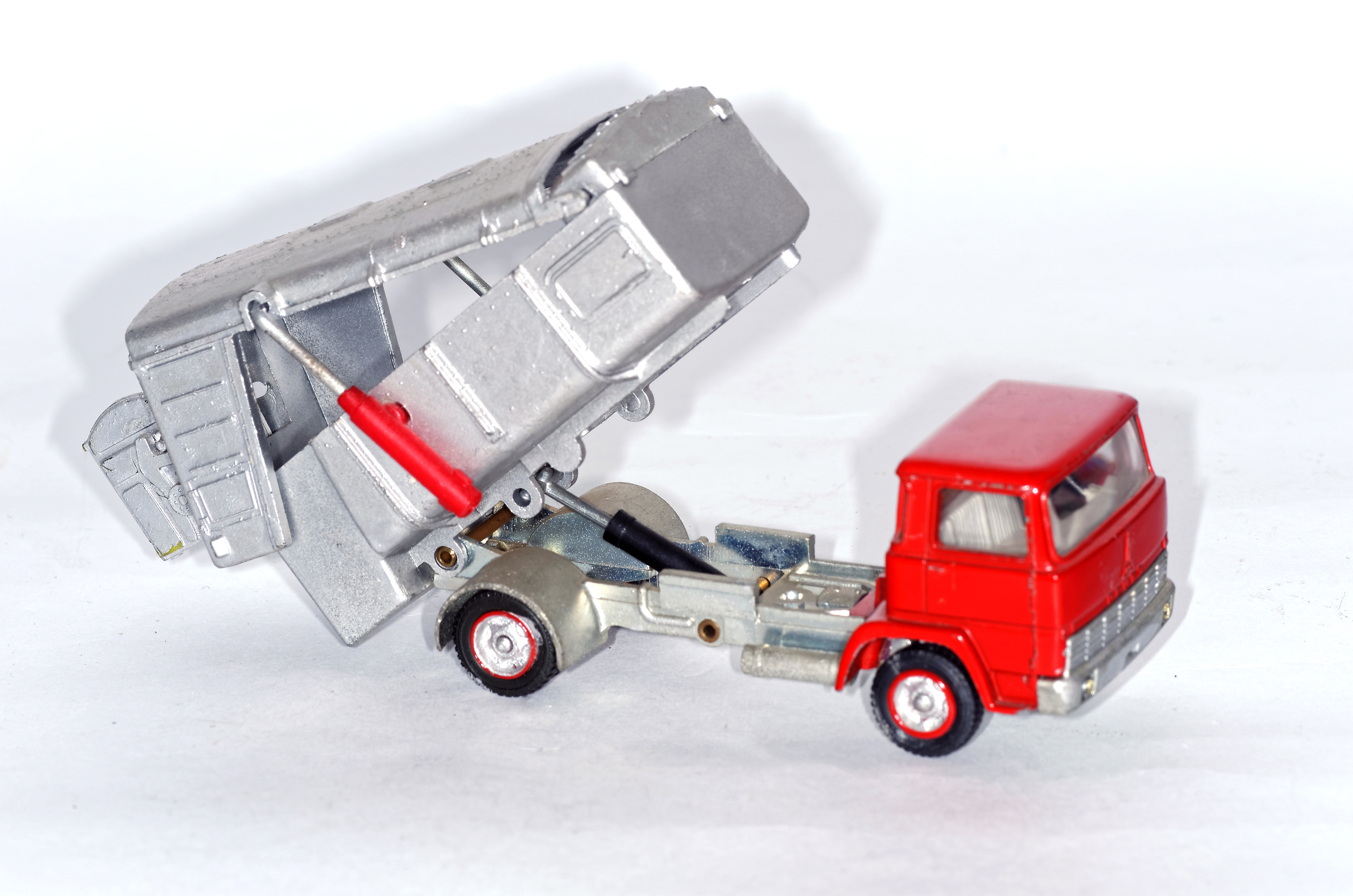
Garbage truck

Small cars were at first packaged in both picture boxes and blister packs. Boxes were dropped entirely by the mid-1980s. Large models were mostly packed in window boxes, with a few exceptions. One controversial design element in this time period was the whitewall tires labeled with 'Siku' on opposite sides of each tire and combined with white 'spoked' wheels that appeared on most vehicles in this series. By the late 1990s, however, realistic wheel designs were adopted instead.

The Super Series is still produced today, and since the incorporation of the Club Series (see below) in the early 1990s, large trucks, as well as tanks and a few aircraft, have been made in the small car size (although their scale varies greatly) and sold in blister packs. Hence, a unified scale of 1:55 (or 1:60 for former V-Series cars) is not uniformly applied.

Super Series vehicles include unconventional sports cars like the Gumpert Apollo or the Wiesmann GT, heavy machinery (like forestry log loaders, piston bully snow tracked vehicles, an ultra-detailed stake bed Mercedes Unimog, potato digger truck), a triple-engined competition pulling tractor, modern tram and subway train cars, and even the AIDAluna cruise ship in 1:1,400 scale (18 cm long).

=== Farmer Series and Siku Control ===
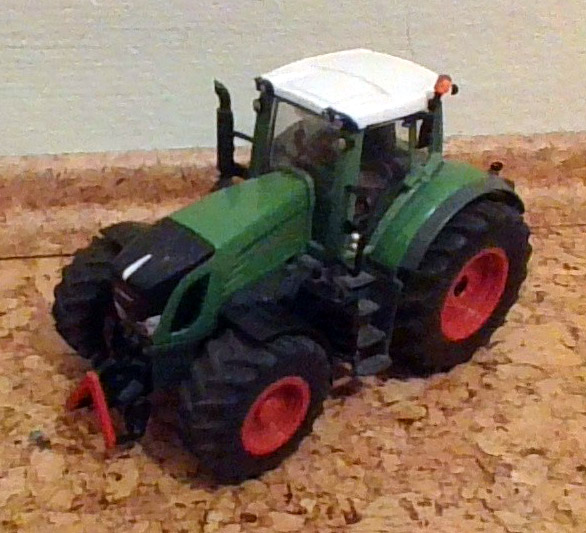
Siku tractor

In 1983, the Farmer Series was introduced, mainly in 1:32 scale. There is a Land Rover in the series used as a farm vehicle—in the United Kingdom and other Commonwealth countries, such Land Rovers were in widespread use on farms. The Farmer Classic line was added in 2002, and focused on old tractors. Subsequently, more detailed and refined farm vehicles were introduced in these two series. For example, Farmer Classic models featured tractors with rustic looking 'aged' paint. After 2005, some of these realistic plastic vehicles, like a MAN refuse truck, were twelve inches long or more and, typical for the era, made in China, not Germany.

In 2004, a radio-controlled tractor was introduced in the new Siku Control line, which added play value in addition to the regular Farmer Series vehicles. These vehicles have radio-controlled acceleration, steering, headlights, and turn indicators. Other models have since been added to the Control line.

=== HO scale models ===
Through the 1980s, HO (1:87) scale manufacturers like Herpa, Busch, Trident, and Roco became more important in the European hobby market. In 1984, Sieper-Werke moved to strengthen itself in this market with the purchase of Wiking-Modelbau, based in West Berlin and famous for HO scale plastic models.

With the scale of the models becoming variable in the Super Series, Siku released the M87 series in 2003. All M87 models are faithfully reproduced in 1:87, though this line is independent of the Wiking line. The range of models is limited but consists of semi-trailers, cranes, farm tractors, and cars. The trucks, cranes, and farm tractors are very similar to those made in smaller size in the Super Series (i.e., those that have their roots in the Club Series). The difference is that the M87 series vehicles are more detailed and are packaged in small window boxes instead of blister packs.

=== Club Series ===
The Club Series was introduced in 1990 and consisted of die-cast trucks and farm vehicles made in a smaller scale (usually 1:87). These were similar to the Super Series in that the blister packages were the same size and shape as those of small cars. The only difference was that the packaging had a different design and read "Siku Club." However, after the first few years of production, the Club line was fully incorporated into the Super Series and adopted the Super packaging design. A few 1:55 models from the Super Series in the "08" price range were also packaged in the "Siku Club" package for a short period of time in 1992, when production switched from Germany to China (the Club Series vehicles have always been produced in China since their debut in 1990).

=== Super Classic ===
This range of classic fire engines in 1:50 scale was added in 2005 to complement modern models in the Super Series. This was done following the success of the Farmer Classic line.

=== SIKU Junior ===
The Siku Junior line was launched in 1998. It consists of larger, detailed plastic trucks, construction vehicles, tractors and other agricultural vehicles and trailers. Siku Juniors are designed somewhat along the lines of Bruder vehicles. Though the line is aimed primarily at outdoor play, with durability being a main feature, a level of detail and realism is still maintained.

=== SIKU World ===
This lineup was launched in 2013. It consists of plastic building and street tiles to complement Siku vehicles.

== International markets ==
With its respected V-Series, Siku battled with Majorette and Efsi for the European market, but became the diecast leaders in Germany. Starting in the early 1970s, Siku entered international markets with increasing success, and the company abandoned most other diecast products, focusing more on vehicles.

While Siku became well known across Europe, the brand never became widely popular in the United States, only sometimes being found at specialty hobby shops. Appearances at large department stores like Walmart, Hills, or Target were rare. The American scarcity was despite offering American cars like the Buick Wildcat, Oldsmobile Toronado, Pontiac Bonneville convertible, Cadillac limousine, Pontiac GTO, Chevrolet Corvette, Lincoln Continental Mark III, Ford Mustang, and Ford trucks. As of 2010, Siku does not export toys to the United States due to conflicts with the 2008 Consumer Product Safety Improvement Act (CPSIA). However, in Canada, Siku vehicles are sold by Mastermind Toys.

== Collection and vintage value ==
The V-Series and the Super Series have recently been highly sought among collectors. The manufacturing quality of the models is significantly higher than average, and the price of individual models is higher as well. Today, new models still retain their quality similar to older Matchbox, Dinky and Corgi of decades past. For example, Siku wheels are more sculpted and detailed. Tires are separated from wheels and made of rubber, while other brands (e.g. Hot Wheels) usually have wheels as single plastic pieces.

== See also ==
- Model cars
- Die-cast toy
