= Wiking Modellbau =

German scale model maker

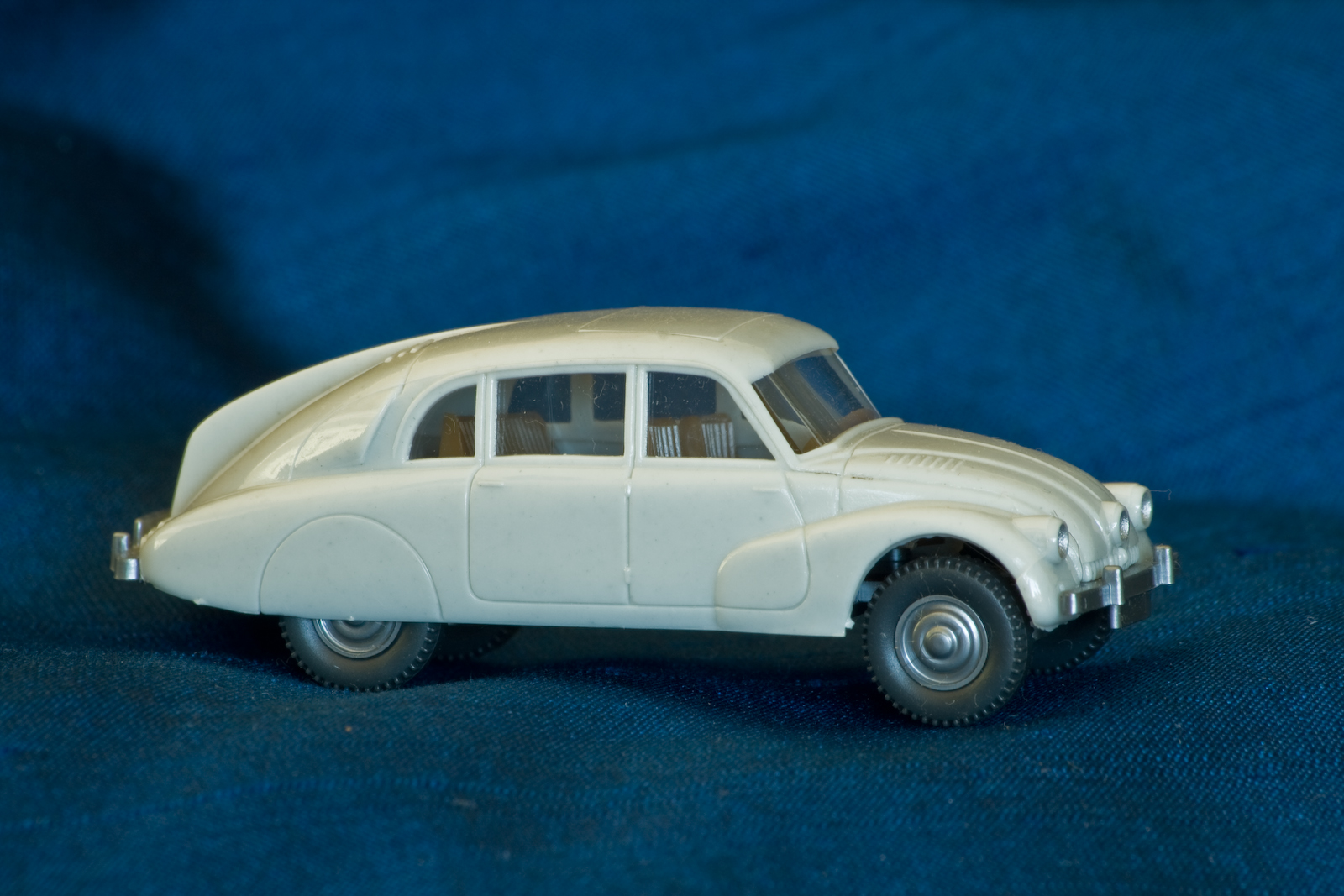
Wiking's Czechoslovak Tatra 87 shows the company's propensity for creative model choices.

Wiking Modellbau is a German manufacturer of scale models in H0 scale and N scale originally made as accessories for model train sets. Founded in 1932 by Friedrich Karl Peltzer, now it is owned by German Siku Toys.

Founded in 1932, traditionally the company was based post-World War II in West Berlin. Later factories were also used in Buer (near Essen) and Kiel. Now owned by German Siku Toys, in Lüdenscheid, the company specializes in models of cars and trucks dating from the 1950s to the present day. Almost invariably models are produced in 1:87 "HO" scale.

== Pre War History ==
Wiking was founded in 1932 by Friedrich Karl Peltzer who had built ships from cigar boxes in his youth. Wiking's beginnings were in producing ship models in 1:1,250 scale. Before and during World War II these models, made of lead based zamac, were used by the German military for training and tactical planning. They were usually marked "Wiking Modell" on their bases. The ships were accompanied by Modell-Hafen (Model Harbors) which were wood representations of piers, buildings and oil facilities to assist in attack training. The military also used new plane models in 1:200 scale beginning in 1934-35, and the so-called Wehrmachtsmodelle (1937–38) of military vehicles and artillery, were issued in 1:200 scale. Beginning in 1938, the planes and some of the ships were made of plastic.

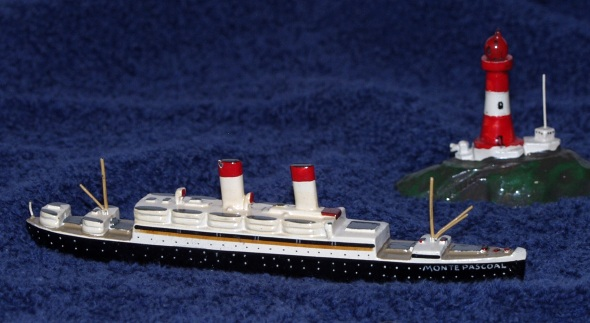
Wooden model ship by Wiking, useful in craft identification in wartime

Based on the Wehrmachtsmodelle, Wiking also made some civilian vehicles whose production ceased at the beginning of World War II.

=== War years ===
During the war, Wiking mostly produced models for the military for training in the identification of planes and ships, an important need during war time. Reportedly, the company employed forced labor, for example; workers from the USSR.

== Wiking Post-war ==
After World War II, but before starting production of model cars, Wiking experimented with a variety of plastics such as for a Noah's ark model and for the molding of plastic combs and buttons. Some clay was also used in production. There was a small series of the Berlin Airlift (1948-1949) that consisted of five planes and two car models in 1:400 scale. At this time, Wiking opened several workshops, including those in Buer and Kiel.

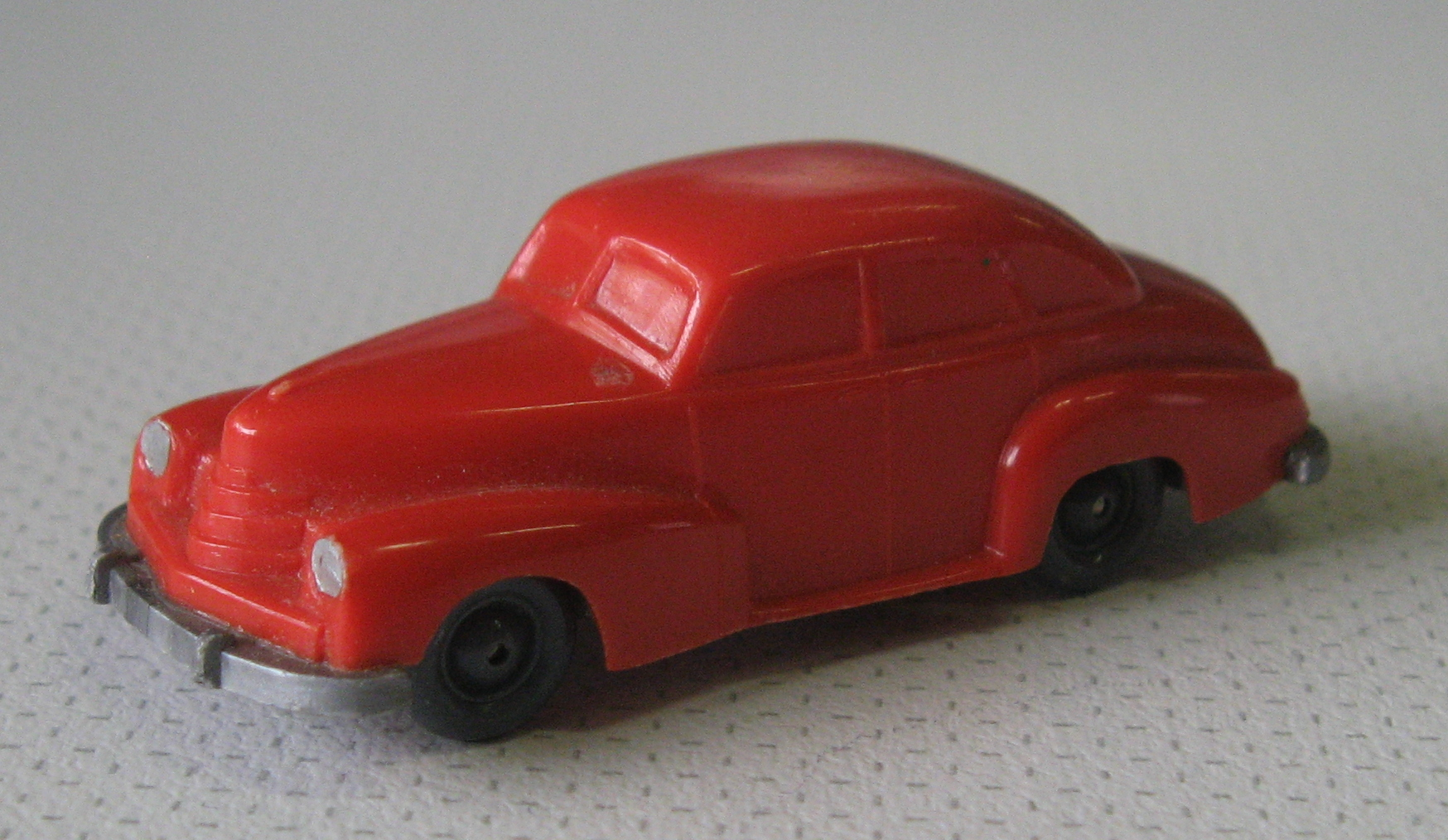
A post war Opel Kapitän

In 1947, Wiking started to produce simple car models that usually consisted of a single part - with no windows or chassis. These were made of plastic in roughly 1:100 scale. Vehicle axles were made of wire with flat pinched ends, that when squeezed into the still warm plastic wheels, could not rotate - thus the axles rolled with the wheels. Later models included chassis bases. The scale was eventually changed to 1:90.

Wiking began to expand its line of vehicles during the 1950s, offering both trucks and cars. Some offerings were Henschel stake and cement trucks, Magirus trucks, the Borgward Arabella, and DKW two door sedan. Many of these were offered in packs of five trucks or ten cars.

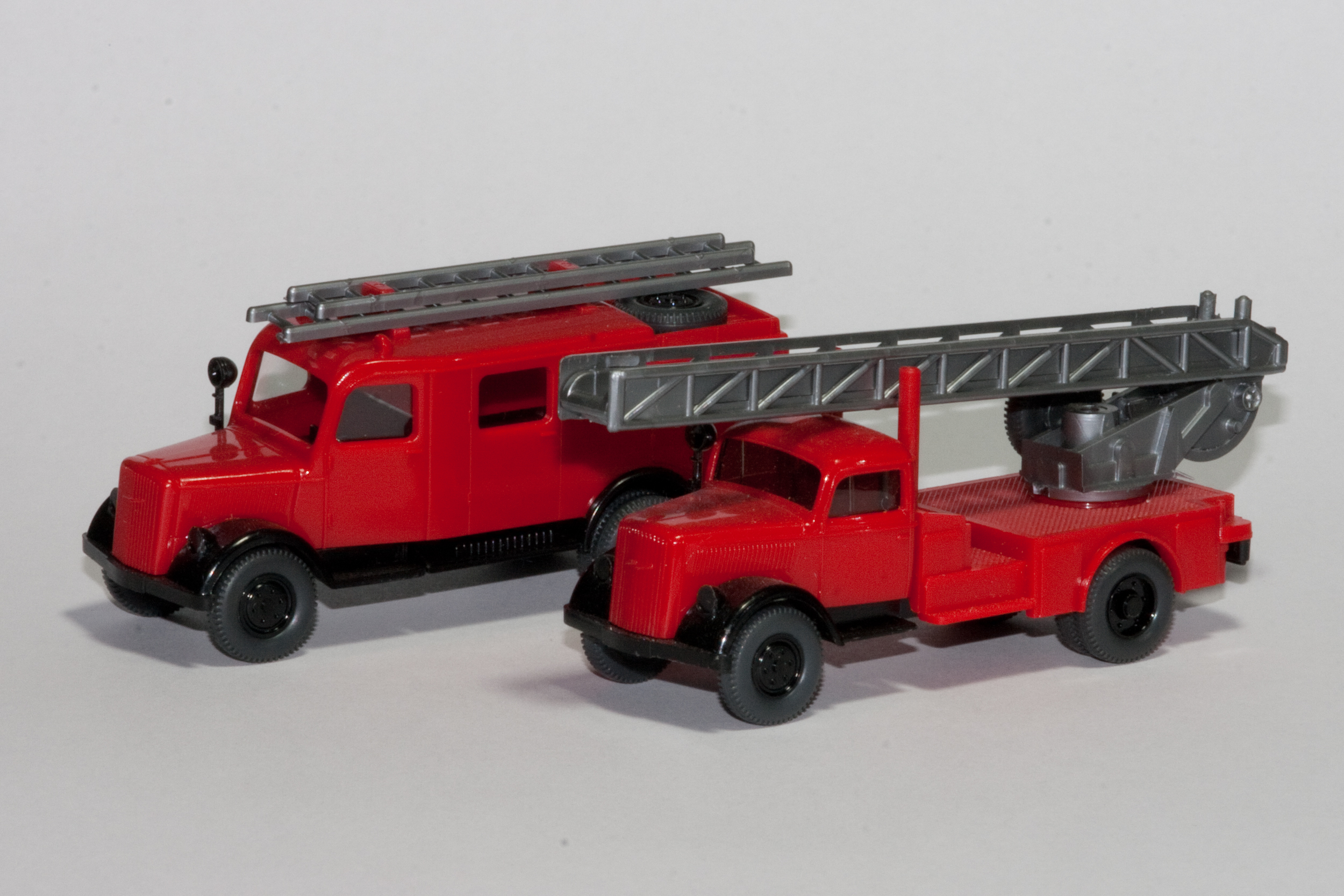
Simple, all business Wiking H0 scale model fire vehicles

In the early 1960s, Volkswagen's Wolfsburg plant commissioned vehicles in a larger 1:40 scale with unique company designed packaging. These are rather rare today - and often worth more than $100, though some of these larger scaled models have been reissued by the company. Particularly interesting was a Wiking Beetle promotional molded in a clear plastic body. It was labeled "Das Gläserne Auto" and available in a special red and blue display box with body, wheels, interior and seats displayed apart from each other. The presentation with clear plastic body hit a chord and the idea was copied by several other manufacturers - even in Britain where one manufacturer produced its own 'glass' car.

Around the early 1960s, transparent windows were added to models. Interiors were added in the 1970s. For some models even the original paint from the car manufacturers is used. Today, the scale has been changed to the more uniform 1:87 (HO). Though this scale matches HO train scale, various scales have been produced and Wiking models today are collected in their own right. The company website refers to "the delightful yet robust toy cars [that] fit in a trouser pocket" indicating their play value independent of other toys.

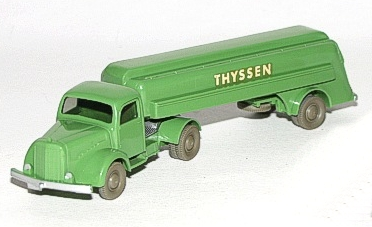
1962 Thyssen tanker truck that achieved a record price at auction

Since 1969, Wiking has produced car models in 1:160 (N) scale – mostly for N-Scale model train sets. Between 1949–50 and 1974–75, Wiking again produced ship models. The company also tried to sell plane models again in the 1960s but this effort was cancelled. Some of these models were made for Ferrero, the Italian chocolate company, scaled down from 1:87 scale to fit inside Kinder Surprise chocolate eggs. Most of these vehicles, though nicely done like the VW bug convertible and the NSU Ro80, were made in Hong Kong. Some were apparently original models, not copies of previously existing Wiking cars.

Today old Wiking models are often collector items which can be very expensive. The most expensive Wiking model ever sold is a Mercedes tank truck from 1962 which was produced as an advertising article for the Thyssen company. In June 2006 one of these tank truck models (shown above) sold for €10,100 at an auction in Cologne.

== Contemporary Wiking ==
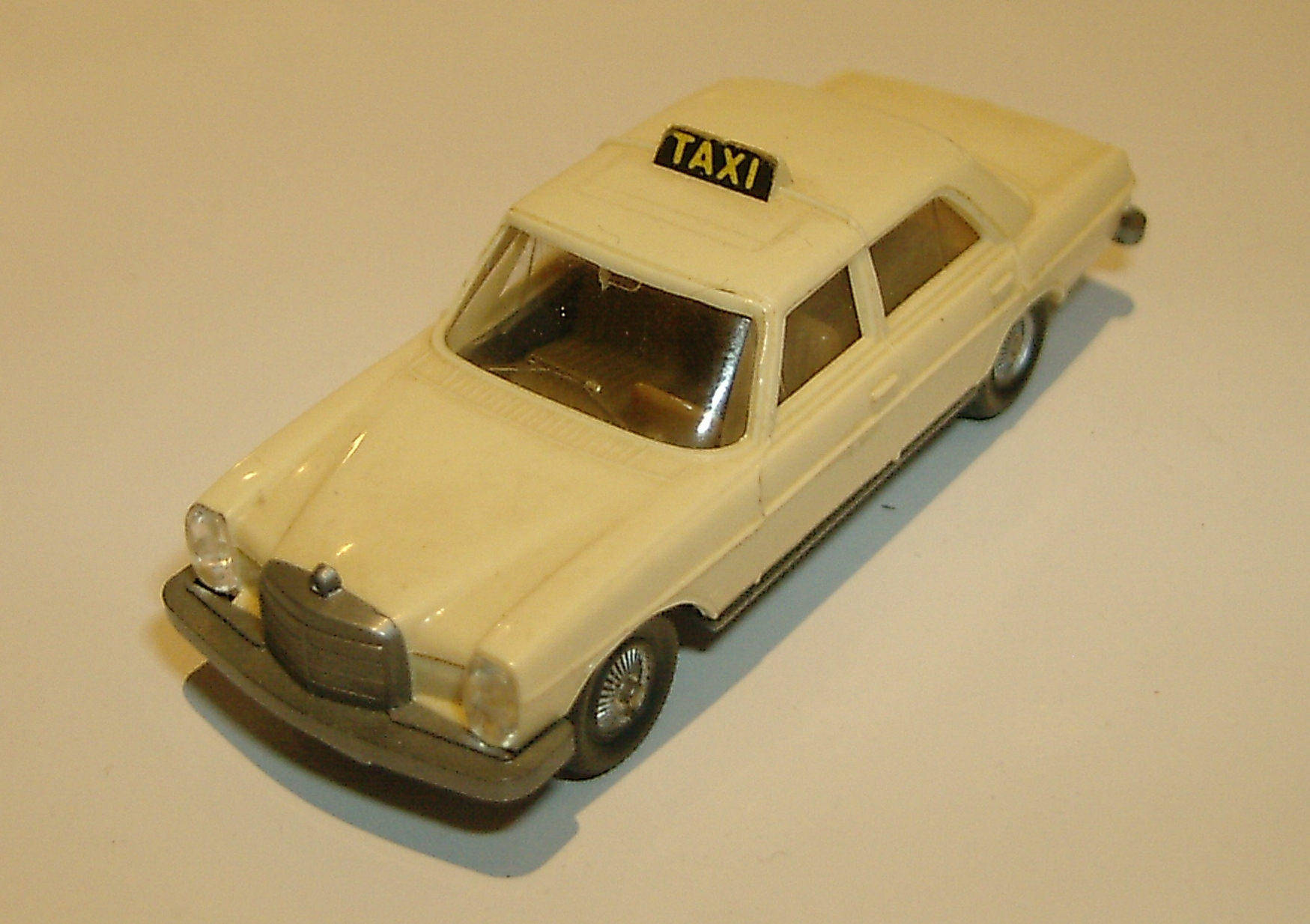
A Mercedes-Benz 250 sedan taxi

In 1953 the workshops in Buer were closed, followed by the Kiel workshops in 1982.

Peltzer died in 1981 at the age of 78. Some collectors consider this to be the end of a golden era, leaving behind an era of many less expensive and unique stylized models - while a new era began of the mass production of expensive models in fewer liveries.

In 1984, Wiking was sold to the Sieper Lüdenscheid, known for its Siku model cars. Today's Wiking models try be perfectly detailed miniatures in their own right in a similar manner to their competitors (e.g. Herpa and Brekina). This is perhaps slightly different from the earlier philosophy of producing a variety of vehicles more oriented toward HO scale railroad sets.

Another big change for the company came in September 2008, when it was announced the traditional home of the factory would be closed and all production would be transferred to the Siku / Sieper works in Lüdenscheid.
