= 1:24 scale =

Scale for models and miniatures

1:24 scale model of the Ford GT, at rear, behind 1:32 and nominal HO models, illustrate the traditional slot car scales.

1:24 scale is a size for automobile models such as injection-molded plastic model kits or metal die-cast toys, which are built and collected by both children and adults.

== Description and context ==
1:24 means that a unit of measurement, such as one inch or one centimeter, on the model represents 24 units on the actual object. An example would be one inch of length on a model automobile would represent 24 inches on an actual vehicle. Primarily automobile models are made on this scale, with a few examples of tractor-trailers and other larger equipment. In the United States, there is a minor variation of the 1:24 scale, where many automobile plastic model kits are scaled at 1:25.

1:24 is the largest of the traditional slot car sizes - and the earliest. Lionel's (USA) 1:24 electric autos of 1912-1916 became the first known commercial slot cars. In 1955, the Model Automobile Racing Association of Kalamazoo, Michigan, built the first track for electric rail-racing (the short-lived immediate predecessor to slot racing) in the US. Unlike the seminal Southport (UK) track that inspired it, the MARA table was designed for 1:24 as well as 1:32 competition. With that beginning, the US adopted 1:24 as the primary scale for serious competition during the heyday of slot car racing in the 1960s, while Britain and Europe favored 1:32 and have continued to do so.

== Non-car models ==
1:24 scale is very close to the scale (1:22.5) used for European G scale narrow-gauge model trains, so 1:24 models are often used on model train layouts. Doll houses and furniture are also found on a 1:24 scale. An average adult male human figure stands just under 3 inches (76 mm) tall.

The British plastic model kit company Airfix has produced several 1:24 scale aircraft in its 'Super Kit' range, including the Supermarine Spitfire, Messerschmitt Bf 109 - both initially with the option of motorised propellers, Junkers Ju 87 Stuka, Hawker Siddeley Harrier, and Focke-Wulf Fw 190. The last to be released were the de Havilland Mosquito and the Hawker Typhoon. An earlier release was a 1:24 scale model of the Wallis WA-116 "Little Nellie" autogyro as portrayed in the 1967 James Bond film, You Only Live Twice.

== List of manufacturers ==
Plastic Model Kits

- Tamiya Corporation
- Airfix
- Revell - Monogram
- Italeri
- AMT
- Hasegawa
- Aoshima
- Fujimi

Die Cast

- Bburago
- Maisto
- Welly
- Motor Max
- Jada Toys
- Greenlight
- Leo (high-detail die-cast models)
- Racing Champions, Inc. (American racecars)
- Hachette
- IXO
- Whitebox
- Heller
- Franklin Mint
- Danbury Mint

Slot Cars

- AUTOart

Toys & Diorama

- American Diorama
- Emergency Heroes

== See also ==
- Gauge 1
- List of scale model sizes
- Scale model
- Slot car scales
- G Scale
- Rail transport modelling scales
