= 1:500 scale =

Scale for models and miniatures

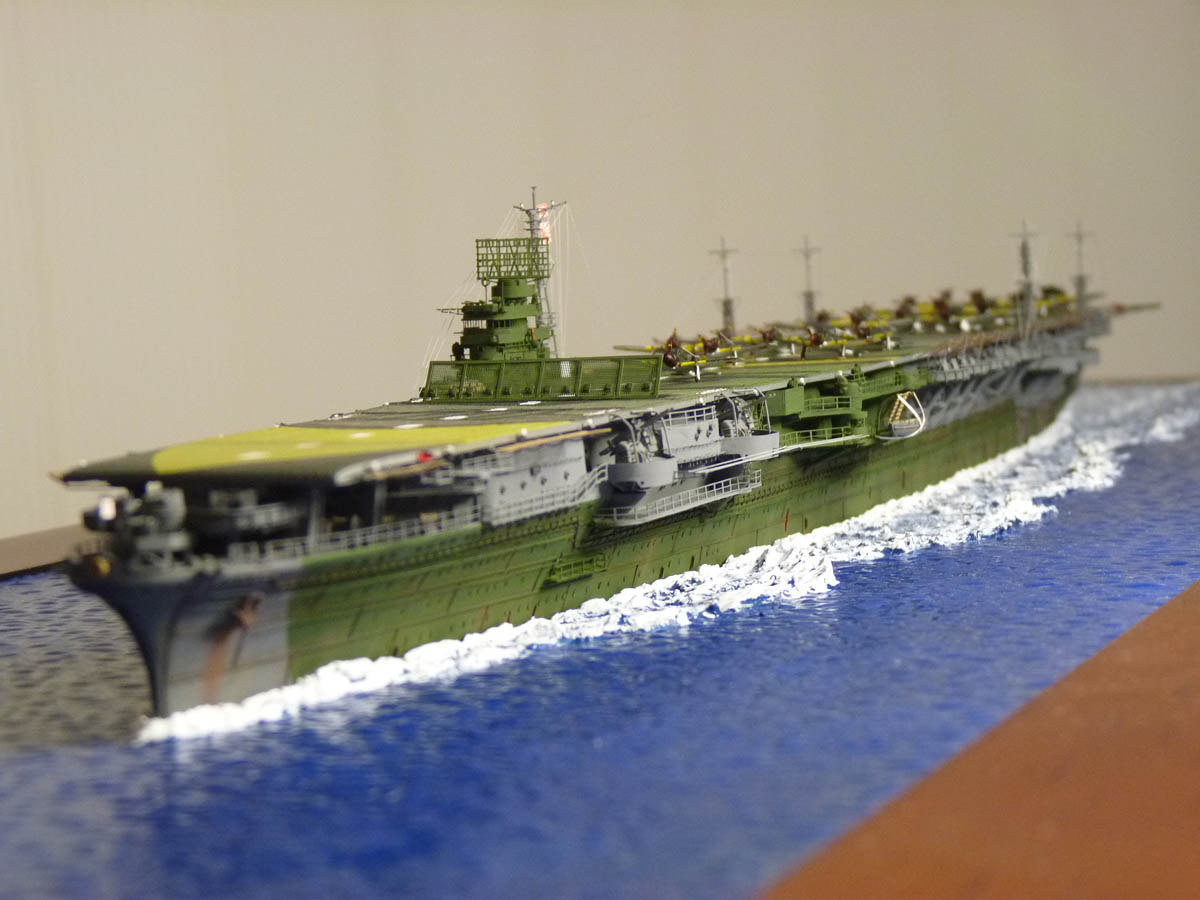
1/500 scale Japanese aircraft carrier Zuikaku plastic model kit released by Nichimo

1:500 scale is a scale mainly used by Europeans for pre-finished die-cast airliner models, such as German manufacturer Herpa. This scale is also used by Japanese model kit manufacturer Bandai, Nichimo Company Ltd. and Fujimi Mokei for ship and science fiction model kits.

== Ship models for the military ==
During World War II, Comet metal Products of Richmond Hill, NY, South Salem Studios of South Salem, NY and H.A. Framburg and Company of Chicago were the major manufacturers of naval recognition ship models for the US Navy. They were commissioned by United States Navy to make ship models used to instruct sailors and airmen to identify ships from various navies. This "friend or foe" recognition was critical in reducing friendly fire incidents. In addition to 1:1200 scale models, these companies also made models in the 1:500 "Teacher Scale." These ships were wither made of wooden hulls with lead superstructures, or die cast of zinc alloy and painted gray. The 1:500 ships were usually arranged in sets and contained fewer models than the 1:1200 scale sets.

== Plastic model kit (ships) ==
In the 1960s, Renwal released fourteen 1:500 scale ship models from World War II or postwar United States Navy, and Frog also released six models from Royal Navy. Both makers had failed in the late 1970s, but some makers such as Chematic rereleased ex Frog 1:500 scale ship models until the 2000s.

In the 1970s, Nichimo released a series of 1:500 plastic scale ship models. The series only comprises a small number of ships, with most of them being ships from World War II Japanese Navy. These models are still under production and widely available in the market. In mid-1970s, Monogram also released models of USS Chicago (CG-11) and USS Columbus in 1:500 scale (actually, 16 in. length box scale). In the late 1990s, Trumpeter released 1:500 scale models of Nimitz class aircraft carrier.

In November 2009, Fujimi released an all-new tooling model of the Japanese battleship Yamato in 1:500 scale. Fujimi then followed on the series by releasing Japanese battleship Nagato and Design A-150 battleship (a Japanese plan for a class of battleship following the Yamato Class, also known as the Super Yamato class) in the same scale.

There are also resin kits available in this scale, such as the USS Gambier Bay (CVE-73) by Aki.

== Plastic model kit (building/structure) ==
Doyusha released a limited number of Japanese castle models in 1/500 scale. These are Himeji Castle, Matsue Castle and Kōchi Castle. They are also available in another version that features gold colour plated parts.

== Plastic model kit (science fiction) ==
1:500 scale is also used in Sci-Fiction plastic model kit by some model manufacturers. AMT released a futuristic spaceship model in the 1960s. Bandai released a model of the Space Battleship Yamato in the 1980s, and an all-new tooling model of the same ship was released in early 2010. Fine Molds began to release spaceship models designed by well known anime and manga artist Leiji Matsumoto in October 2011.

== Collectables (aircraft) ==
Herpa launched a Wings series of airplane collection models in the 1:500 scale in 1992. The series also includes model diorama airports and airport accessories.

F-toys also released 1/500 scale pre-painted and mostly pre-assembled plastic "trading kits" on JAL and ANA commercial aircraft.

Other manufacturers like Aeroclassics, Inflight500, etc. also offer 1:500 scale model aircraft.

== Unit conversion ==
Reality – Scale model

0.1 m – 0.2 mm
0.2 m – 0.4 mm
0.4 m – 0.8 mm
0.5 m – 1 mm
1 m – 2 mm
2 m – 4 mm
3 m – 6 mm
20 m – 40 mm
100 m – 200 mm
1 km – 2000 mm
2 km – 4000 mm

== See also ==
- Scale model
- Ship model
- List of scale model sizes
