= Herpa =

German manufacturing company that produces die-cast scale model aircraft

Herpa Miniaturmodelle GMBH
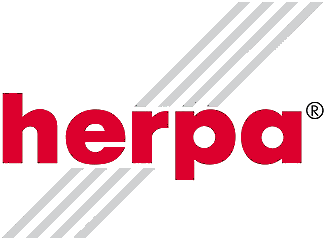
- Type: Private
- Founded: 1949; 77 years ago as "Hergenröther und Patente"
- Founder: Wilhelm Hergenröther
- Headquarters: Dietenhofen, Germany
- Key people: Claus & Dieter Wagener (General Managers); Klaus Schindler (General Marketing and Sales); Walter Wehr (General Production)
- Products: Die-cast scale model aircraft; plastic model cars, trucks
- Brands: Herpa Cars & Trucks; Herpa Wings; Der Maßstab; WingsWorld
- Website: herpa.de

Herpa Miniaturmodelle GMBH (or simply Herpa, an acronym for "Hergenröther und Patente”, the original name of the firm), is a German manufacturing company that produces die-cast scale model aircraft (under the "Herpa Wings" trademark) and plastic model cars and trucks under the "Herpa Cars & Trucks" trademark. The mainstay of the Herpa Wings range is in the 1/500 scale, although models have also been produced in the 1/400, 1/200, and 1/1000 scales as well.

The Herpa Cars & Trucks range is mainly produced in the 1:87 scale, although 1:120 and 1:160 scales are also offered.

Herpa also produces magazines for car & truck enthusiasts and model aircraft enthusiasts, known as Der Maßstab and WingsWorld respectively.

== History ==
The company was founded in Nuremberg by inventor and patent holder Wilhelm Hergenröther to produce accessories for model railways. In 1978, model cars made in 1:87 scale were presented at the International Toy Fair in Nuremberg. Herpa continued to extend this product line. Every following car model was put on the market using snap-fit construction (without any necessary gluing).

In 1980, Herpa presented the first model trucks. Following that, in 1981, Herpa's truck models sport tipping cabins revealing an exact reproduction of an engine within. Industrial customers also start to use Herpa’s car models as an advertising instrument with their own company’s branding. The first issue of Der Maßstab was released in 1982. Herpa launched the HIGH-TECH series in the 1:87 scale in 1986, with the first model in the series a Ferrari Testarossa consisting of 22 pieces, an opening hood and technical features such as a 12-cylinder motor and wheels with separate suspension.

In 1987, the first plastic samples of model aircraft of Boeing 747-200s in the 1:500 scale are produced. These models were presented to Lufthansa at an initiation ceremony for a Boeing 737-300 at Nuremberg Airport. Lufthansa then orders the production of the Lufthansa Model-Edition in the 1/200 scale exclusively for the airline. Herpa then launches the Lufthansa Model-Edition in 1988 with a replica of the Boeing 737-300.

In 1992, the Herpa Wings series of airplane models in the 1:500 scale were launched in Nuremberg. These models came with rolling landing gear, an industry first that has not been duplicated. Tamp printing was used to create highly detailed replicas of their originals. Several airlines placed orders with Herpa for the production of airplane models in their respective liveries.

In 1993, Herpa created the first motorcycle in the 1:87 scale. A licensing contract with plane manufacturer Boeing was also signed in 1995. The first set of airport accessories was produced in 1996. Herpa received the ISO 9001 certificate from the Bavarian Trade and Business Institute for the upholding of a quality management system that meets the highest European norms.

In 1997, Herpa Wings magazine WingsWorld was launched, alongside the first model aircraft in the 1:200 scale. The Herpa Wings Club was launched in 1999 in conjunction with Herpa's 50th anniversary.

2001 marked the start of the retailer initiative Herpa eXtra. The combined online/offline distribution concept was received by fifty initial retailers in various European countries. A Herpa Wings Christmas model was also produced for the first time. In 2004, the first Herpa Wings 1/1000 model was released, and more followed soon after. Also, a DC-3 was flown in company colours at various air-shows across the United States. The DC-3 flown was also available in the Herpa Wings collection in a scale of 1:200. The 'Scenix' range was also launched in 2006. In 2007, Herpa took on the Minitanks brand and product line of military vehicles from Austrian manufacturer, Roco.

== Products ==
=== Herpa Wings ===
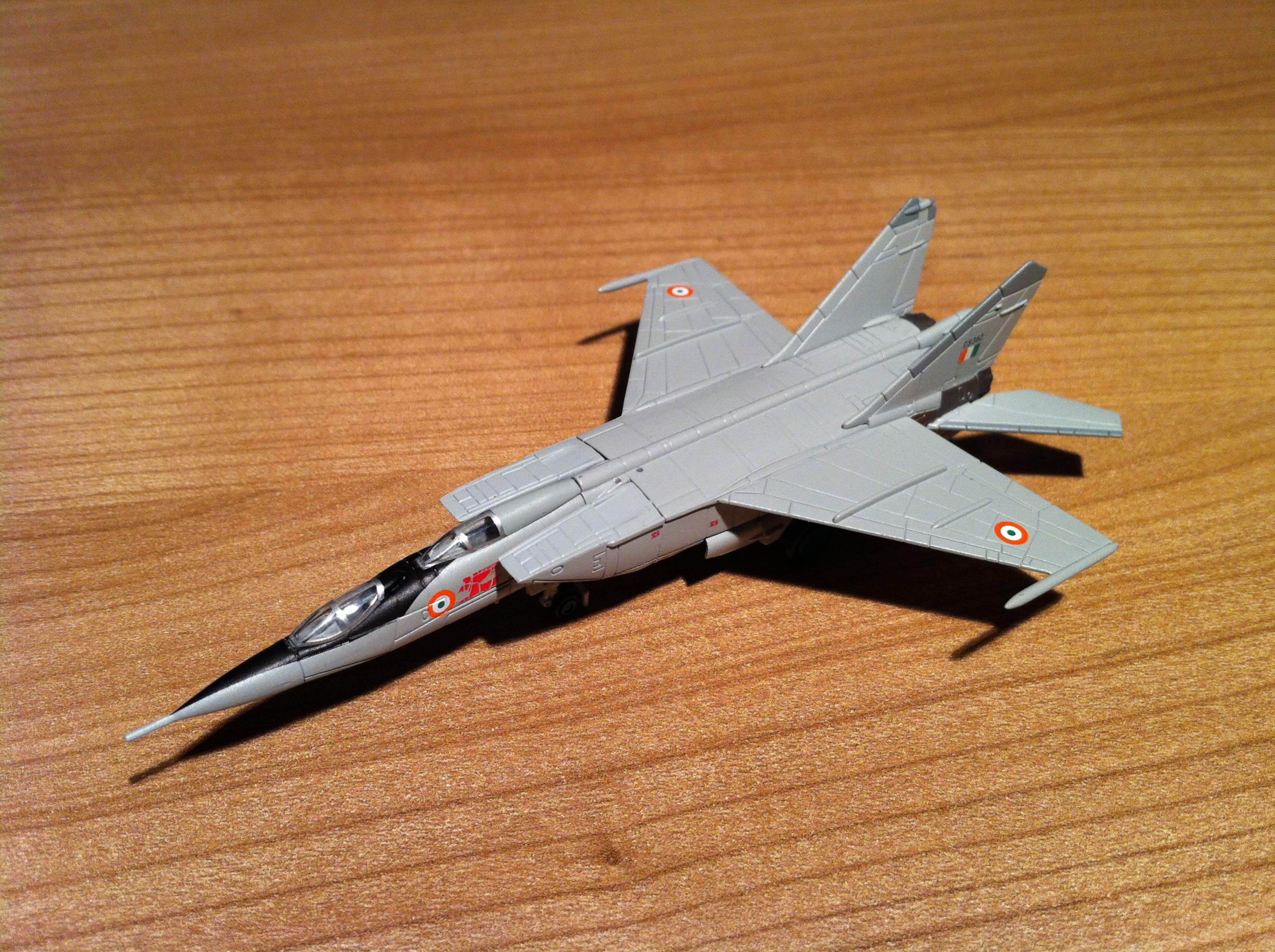
Indian Air Force, No. 102 Squadron "Trisonics"

Herpa Wings produces model aircraft in scales of 1/200, 1/400, 1/500, 1/600 and 1/1000. Approximately 4,000 different versions of 300 airlines in 19 different aircraft types have been released since its founding in 1992. Many airlines such as Cathay Pacific and Singapore Airlines stock Wings models as part of their on-board duty-free catalogues. These exclusive models are sold by the airlines onboard and aren't available in the regular collection.

=== Herpa Cars & Trucks ===
Herpa Cars & Trucks releases model cars and trucks in the 1/87 H0 scale, but also in the 1/160 and 1/220 scales. Since 1978, 37 different types in 200 liveries have been produced, with many used by industrial customers.

=== Minitanks ===
On October 1, 2007, Herpa took on the worldwide distribution of the Minitanks product line from Austrian manufacturer, Roco (Modelleisenbahn GmbH). This military series has been in production since 1960 and produces vehicles from a variety of eras in both N and H0 scale.

=== Scenix ===
Although the first Scenix Mercedes-Benz Actros "Black Edition" model was already available in December 2005, the SCENIX series was officially launched in 2006. The series is made up of models presented in a PC box that personifies truck models with light and sound.

Also, Scenix comprises Herpa Wings accessories. Entire airport dioramas can be assembled, with many airport accessories also available to supplement these dioramas. Features such as runway lights have also been added in recent times. Airport buildings and accessories are mainly available in the 1/500 scale, with a few exceptions in the 1/400 scale.

=== Publications ===
Der Maßstab and WingsWorld are the two magazines produced by Herpa for car and truck enthusiasts and model aircraft enthusiasts. Initiated in 1986 and 1997, respectively, these magazines were only made available to Herpa Cars Club and Herpa Wings Club members. However, these magazines are now available via subscription to non-members, with Club members still receiving these magazines as part of their membership.

Herpa also releases annual catalogues for the Herpa Wings and Herpa Cars & Trucks collection, which highlight the various products for the year. New-release brochures are also available to Club members.

== See also ==
- Rail transport modelling
