= Pro-Touring =

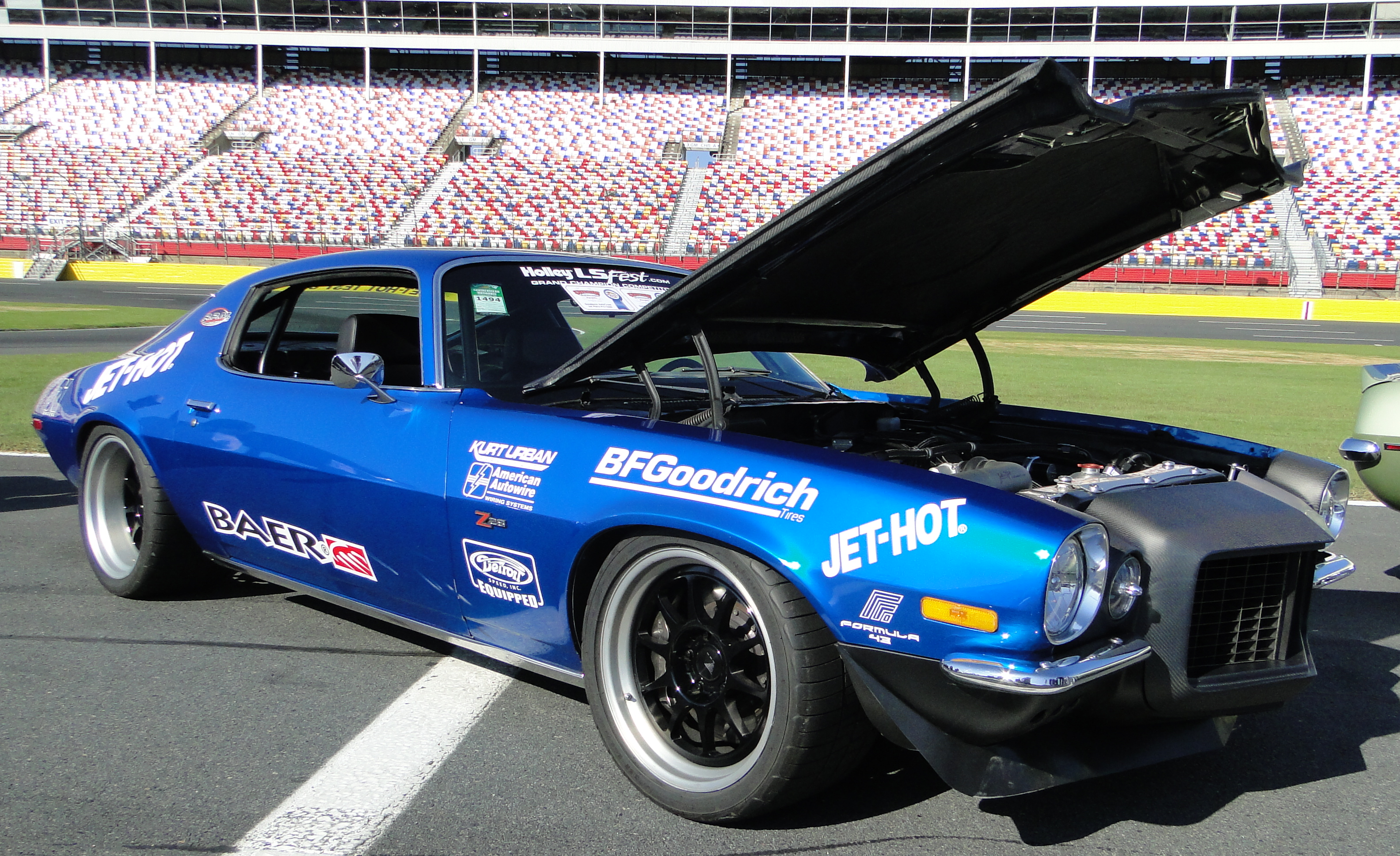
An example of a Pro-Touring build; a 1970 Chevrolet Camaro built for autocross with modifications including upgraded suspension and subframe, a 600hp 427ci LS engine and a carbon fiber front end.

Pro-Touring is a style of classic muscle car with enhanced suspension components, brake system, drivetrain, and aesthetics, including many of the amenities of a new performance car. These modified muscle cars have been developed to function as well as, or to surpass, the capabilities of the foremost modern performance vehicles. Pro-Touring cars are built with an emphasis on function and are intended to be driven. Whether they are driven on the street, the race track, the drag strip, or through cones at an auto-cross is of no difference.

== History ==
Credit for coining the term ‘Pro-Touring' itself to define the emerging genre is widely attributed to Mark Stielow, GM Program Engineering Manager, and Car Craft magazine’s Tech Editor Jeff Smith, who was heading up Chevy High Performance magazine at the time. Mark Stielow can also take credit for helping grow the new concept through his own projects such as the white 1969 Chevrolet Camaro known as Tri-Tip that competed in the One Lap of America in 1993. The Camaro was widely covered and created a surge in interest, and once the term was put in print, it stuck. Since that time, Stielow has built a number of trailblazing Chevrolet Camaros with names like "The Mule," "Red Devil" and "Mayhem," many of which have graced the covers of some of the industry's most beloved publications, including Hot Rod magazine, Car Craft magazine, and Popular Hot Rodding magazine, further fueling the pro-touring trend.

== Car Platforms & Models ==
There is no rule that says pro-touring machines have to be built from any particular car platform or car model. Historically, however, pony cars are the most popular type used. The perennial favorite model is the Chevrolet Camaro with, typically, the Chevrolet Camaro (first generation) cars being the preferred choice for builders, with the Chevrolet Camaro (second generation) reaching new levels of popularity these days. Other cars known to have been used are the Ford Mustang and the De Tomaso Pantera.

== See also ==
- Car tuning
- Hot rod
- Preservation and restoration of automobiles
- Vehicle modification
