= Snap-fit =

Type of assembly method

A snap-fit is an assembly method used to attach flexible parts, usually plastic, to form the final product by pushing the parts' interlocking components together. There are a number of variations in snap-fits, including cantilever, torsional and annular. Snap-fits, as integral attachment features, are an alternative to assembly using nails or screws, and have the advantages of speed and no loose parts. Snap-fit connectors can be found in everyday products such as battery compartment lids, snap fasteners and pens.

== History ==
Snap-together connectors have been used for thousands of years. The first ones were metal. Some of the oldest snap-fits found are snap fasteners, or buttons, shown on the Chinese Terracotta Army featuring soldiers from the late Warring States period. Metal snap fasteners, spring clips, and other snap-type connectors are still in broad use today.

With the development of new flexible yet springy materials, such as molded plastic, and new manufacturing processes, many new variations in these types of connectors have been invented, and are commonly called snap-fits. They can be found in on our phones, laptops, keys, and other household devices. Engineers have studied and developed these snap-fits, creating formulae concerning the amount of deflection allowed on the components, amount of torque one can take, and the amount of space one can allow in order to be detached.

== Production ==
Molds of the parts are created and hot liquid plastic is poured into the molds. The molds contain the shape of the parts and the snapping component built in. However, one major risk when the cooling of the mold finishes is the product shrinking causing errors in the attachment parts.

Building a snap-fit design requires more precise engineering than a screw or nail assembly, and is often more expensive. When snap-fits are being made, the producer needs to determine where the stresses of the parts will be applied to when assembled, or they break during assembly. The high production costs are due to the amount of calculation and precision that must be done in order to create a strong snap-fit. Another reason is the creation of molds; they are more time-consuming from the integration of parts in the product.

== Design ==
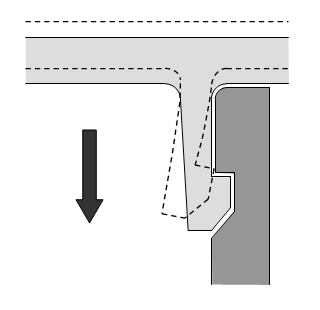
Cantilever snap-fit

The design of the snap-fit determines what it can be used for. There are three main types of snap-fits: annular, cantilever, and torsional. Most snap-fit joints have a common design of a protruding edge and a snap-in area. The specific name of the snap-fit is usually named after the type of stress or strain it utilizes; the torsional snap-fit uses torque to hold parts in place.

=== Annular ===
The annular snap-fit utilizes a hoop-strain to hold into place. Hoop-strain is the expansion of the circumference of the more elastic piece as it is pushed onto the more rigid piece. In most cases the design is circular. Some popular examples are pen caps, ball and socket joints, snap fasteners and some water bottle caps. This kind of snap-fit can be used multiple times. However, permanent strain may develop, loosening the joint when it is used too often.

=== Cantilever ===
The cantilever snap-fit is the most commonly used snap-fit of the three. A cantilever design can be multiple use or permanent. A multiple-use snap-fit usually has a lever or pin to be pushed, in order to undo the snap-fit. However, on a permanent snap-fit there is no lever or pin. Attempting to undo a permanent snap-fit can result in the piece breaking.

Some potential problems with being able to undo the snap-fit is hyper-extending it past its breaking point. As a solution, some parts have a stopper in order to stop the snap-fit from breaking. One very popular example is a battery compartment lid.

=== Torsional ===
Similarly to Cantilever snap fits, in a torsional snap fit one must deflect, or force the protruding edges of piece B away from the insertion area. Piece A then slides in between the protruding edges until the desired distance is reached. The edges of piece B are then released and piece A is held in place. The snap-fits in this description are the protruding edges of piece B. These types of snap-fits may have a spring in place; so that when activated, the locked in piece is released and put into action.
