= Exclusive First Editions =

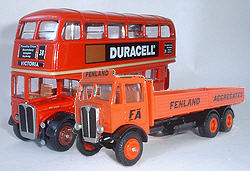
EFE's first AEC models

The Exclusive First Editions (EFE) is a UK-based die-cast model manufacturer. It began trading in 1989, when the company released its first models of an AEC bus and truck. Models are mostly produced in 1/76th scale, which matches the standard scale for UK OO gauge model railways. The initial aim of EFE was to provide a range of die-cast models representing diverse history of UK road vehicles. The models are designed in the UK and manufactured in China.

By the end of 2010 the total number of EFE model items produced had passed the 2000 mark, with around 90 new releases each year.

On the 5 October 2016 Gilbow (Holdings) Ltd, the company behind the Exclusive First Edition range, came to administration. On 17 October 2016 Bachmann Europe plc announced their acquisition of the Exclusive First Editions range of 1/76th scale die-cast models including buses, coaches, lorries and London Underground tube trains.

== History ==
The first releases came in summer 1989. They proved successful with the AEC Regent III RT bus in particular receiving much acclaim. Expansion of the range occurred in 1990 with the launch of the first single-deck coaches, the Harrington Grenadier & Cavalier. Around the same time another truck, the Atkinson Knight, and a set of four sports cars were also added to the range; however, it was once again the passenger service models that proved the most popular and from this point onwards the bus and coach models became the main focus of the range.

In the following years the range of bus models was vastly expanded to include among others the famous London Transport AEC Routemaster in some different versions, Leyland National single decker, Bristol MW coach, MCW Atlantean and Fleetline, Bristol VRT, Leyland Titan, AEC Regal IV and the London Transport GS class Guy Motors single-decker.

The number of truck types was also doubled with the addition of the Bedford TK and Ergomatic cabs in 1996. Between 2005 and 2007 four further cabs – an AEC Mark V, ERF KV, Foden S24 and Ford Thames Trader – were added to the range. The original AEC Mammoth Major cab was withdrawn from the range and retooled to produce the later Mark III version in 2004.

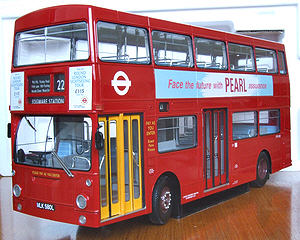
The big 1/24-scale DMS bus

During 2005 EFE through its parent company Gilbow Holdings moved into the larger 1/24-scale market when it released a series of highly detailed London Transport Daimler Fleetline (DMS) models; this range expanded at the end of 2007 with the release of the MCW Metrobus Mark I and EFE also planned to release their first single-deck 1/24 bus model which would depict London Transport's 1950s AEC RF – no release date has been announced yet for this model.

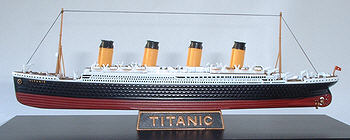
Titanic White Star Line ocean liner

Gilbow was also chosen as the brand under which a series of White Star Line ocean liners were produced; the models were issued between 1998 and 2000 and depicted the Titanic, Britannic and Olympic liners in various guises, these models no doubt came about because of the huge success of the Titanic Hollywood movie released in 1996.

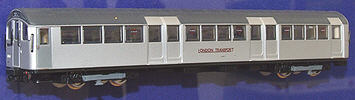
One of the tube train carriages

Another range launched under the Exclusive First Editions banner involved model London Underground tube trains. Three different types have been released depicting 1938, 1959 and 1962 stock carriages; these models are mainly of plastic construction but have been designed to allow motorization for used on model railway layouts if required.

A new range of trackside accessories were produced in 2009. Items include tube station style seating and sections of underground escalator. A number of roadside items were also released including various styles of UK pillar boxes, telephone kiosks and London Bus Stop flags.

Later new castings from EFE depict the series 1/2 Bristol VR with flat windscreens, and the bus shell version of Alexander's Y-type bodywork – the original coach shell version of this model has also been refreshed.

In October 2016 Exclusive First Editions went into liquidation and was subsequently acquired by Bachmann.

== Influence ==
Following the success of the EFE models other manufacturers have launched their own ranges of 'OO' scale model buses. Most notable among these are Corgi Classics with its Original Omnibus Company range which now numbers over 800 models. More entrants to the field include Creative Master Northcord and Britbus. Both companies were quickly expanding their own catalogue of 1/76 scale bus models.
