= Tekno (toy manufacturer) =

Danish toy and scale models manufacturer

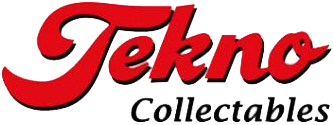
- Founded: 1928 in Copenhagen, Denmark
- Headquarters: De Lier, Netherlands
- Products: Scale model die-cast trucks, cars, airplanes
- Website: tekno.com

Tekno is a Danish manufacturing company (as "Dansk Legetojs Industri") of scale model trucks and other vehicles, currently headquartered in De Lier, Netherlands. Originally established and based in Copenhagen, Tekno began manufacturing construction toys in 1928 and model vehicles immediately after World War II, selling 1 million a year during its peak.

While Tekno began as a toy company, it later shifted to promotional truck models as adult collectibles, and the company's headquarters was moved to the Netherlands. In the past, Tekno also manufactured model cars and airplanes.

== History ==
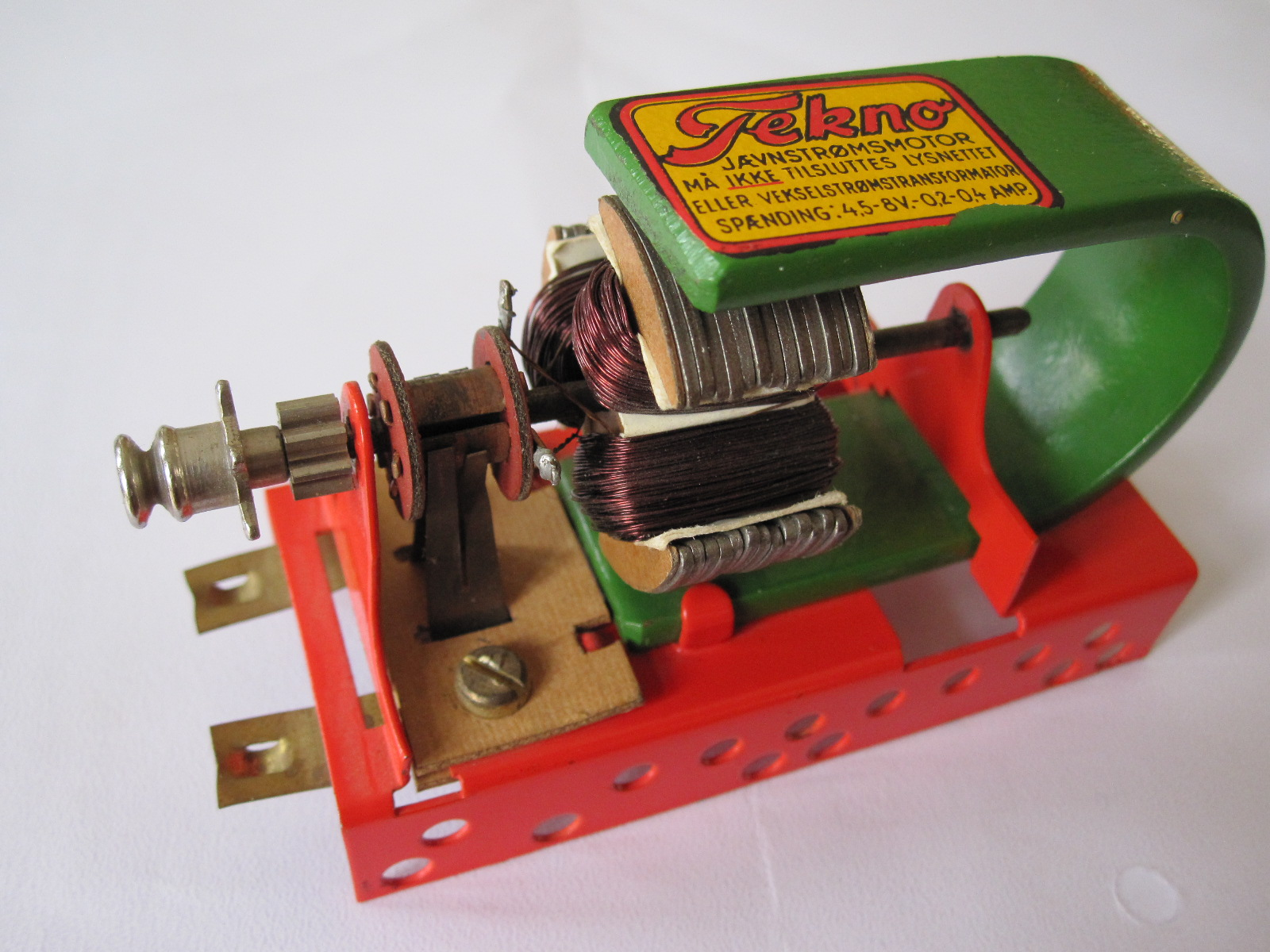
A small electric motor by Tekno

Established in 1928, Tekno was the only Scandinavian company to become an accomplished die-cast toy producer, somewhat similar to the German Schuco Modell, Märklin, or Gama Toys. All of these were model firms that existed before World War II. The founder was A. Siegumfeldt, a plumber from Copenhagen, who after many years of producing wooden toys, began producing die-cast vehicles post-war perhaps late 1945. Through the 1950s, Tekno gradually became a main competitor, even to Dinky Toys.

Brochures show that the company regally celebrated its 25th anniversary in 1953. By this time a wide variety of trucks, tractors and cars were being produced along with toy miniature pots, pans and other kitchenware (Tekno Dansk 1953). Wooden houses, cranes, trucks and other toys - even small electric motors - were also made. Also in the 1950s, sometimes toys were produced in association with the Swedish company Brio.

== Diecasters involved ==
Tekno die-cast cars and airplanes were manufactured previous to world war 2, and then after, in the main factory in Kirkebjerg, west of central Copenhagen. The complete story of toy manufacturing in the company is quite complex. From 1949 through about 1969, many Tekno models were also made by H. Langes Legetøj (Langes Toys), a diecaster in Copenhagen with which Tekno apparently had an informal association.

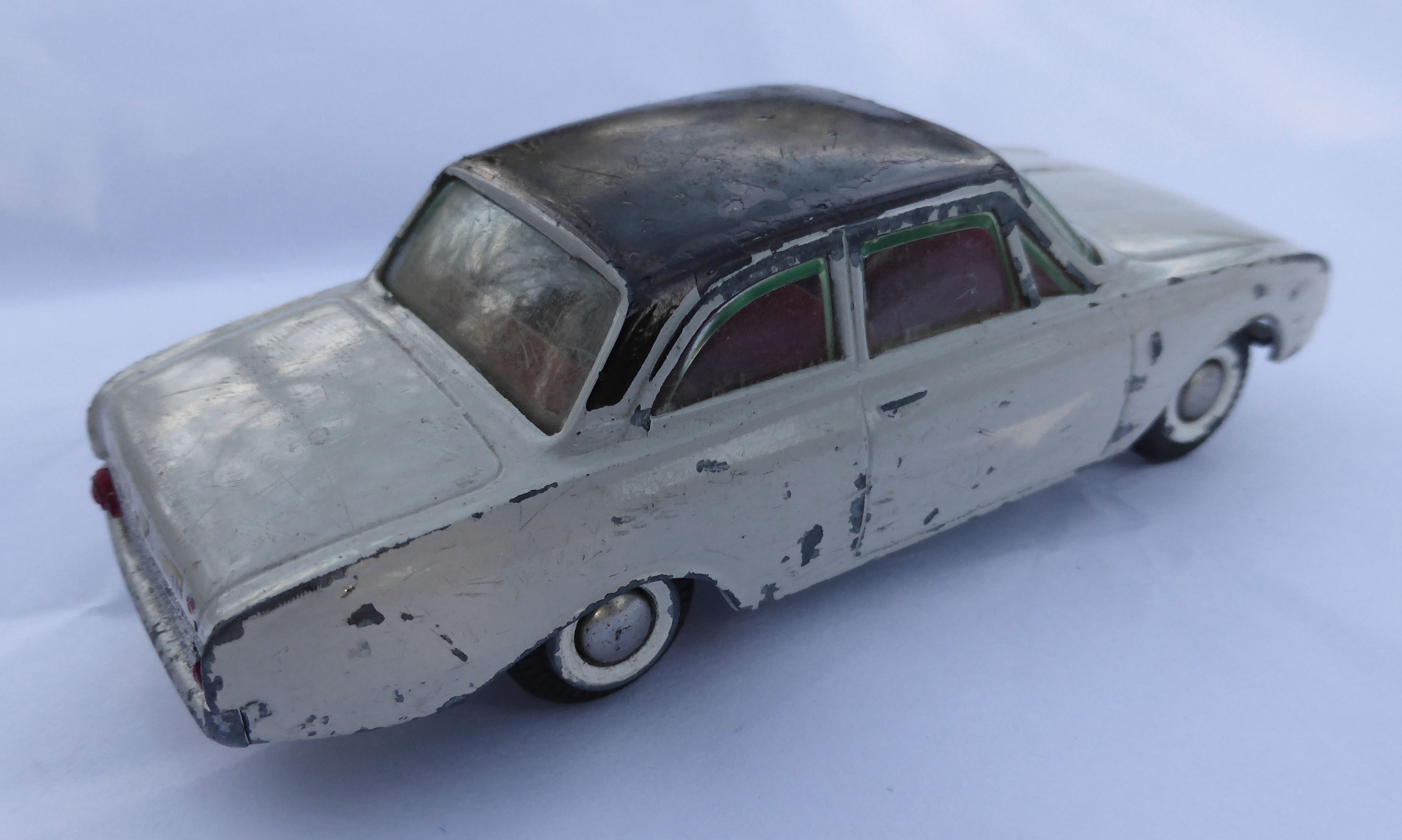
An early Tekno German Ford Taunus with typical two-part wheels

Langes Legetøj also cooperated with a company called Termax - which was in the same building. Termax developed many of the cars, for example, all Mercedes models, Jaguar E type, Opel models, and the DKW Junior. They then were often produced or assembled by Lange's Legetøj.

Some of Tekno's parts were cast in Nyrnbergade (where Langes & Termax were located) and then sent west about four miles for assembly in Kirkebjerg. Tekno even had another factory on the Rentemestervej and one also in Frederikssund. Later, production was also done in Glostrup, about three miles west of Kirkebjerg.

Langes Toys were bought by Kirk Toys in 1958 which saw the replacement of the Tekno name with Kirk on some vehicle bases through the 1960s. In 1969, the old agreement between Langes Legetøj and Tekno was terminated. Kirk had existed as early as 1892 as Emil Møller Phone Factory. Since 1970 the company has been sold many times. For some time it was called Kirk telecom and then in 2012 became Spectralink Europe ApS. Kirk is a family name, and in the period 1923–1967 the family stood at directorship of the phone factory. Apparently, Kirk's involvement in the toy business was a small venture compared to greater phone production.

== Model selection and details ==
Tekno was known for favoring Swedish auto maker Volvo Cars, making coupés, sedans, and wagons. Some of these models were used by Volvo as promotional models. Tekno had a reputation for accuracy and realism - its Volvo models and many others like the Oldsmobile Toronado and Jaguar X-KE had superb proportions and detail. Tekno trucks were also known for their detail, such as the Ford D-800 tilt-cab decorated for Tuborg Beer which featured thirty-two removable beer cases. Still, in the early 1960s, the company often used the unrealistic, flashy practice of using jeweled headlights, similar to Dinky Toys, Corgi Toys, or Mebetoys.

An analysis of one particular Tekno, no. 928, the Mercedes-Benz 230 SL convertible in 1:43 scale, shows the company's attention to detail. The model's hood, trunk, and both doors opened. The engine compartment was very detailed. Wheels were produced in three parts: rubber tire, painted wheel rim, and metal cap with the Mercedes star. The wheel detail alone gave the car a feel of being realistic and solid. The front grille was slotted and one could see the radiator behind it. On this model, headlights are done in clear plastic, though rear lights are painted onto precisely shaped metal trim. The doors open and the windows are rolled up, unusual for diecast models since, for such detail, extra parts are necessary, raising costs. In the interior, the dashboard and steering wheel have accurate shapes and the seats not only tilt, but slide back and forth. There is a spare tire in the trunk. The chassis is painted (usually white) whereas most 1:43 diecast manufacturers often left it bare. One manufacturing problem was that with the opening doors, the front and rear sections of the car's diecast body were only connected by very narrow strips of metal causing the body to droop downward at each end, causing the rear to sag away from the doors, so the doors do not fit finely to the body.

== Promotional emphasis ==
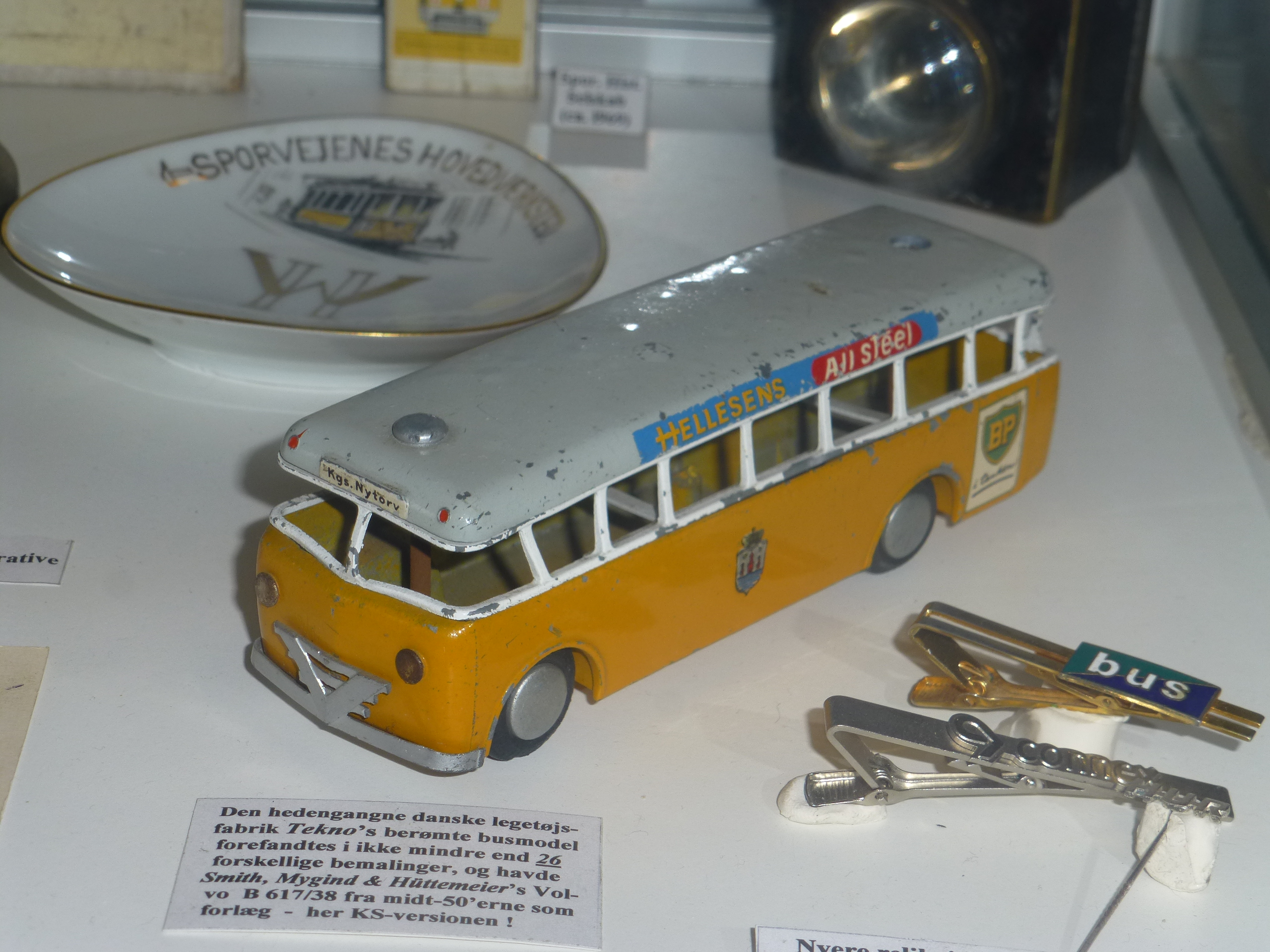
An older, simpler Tekno toy bus

More than any other diecast maker, Tekno was known for its variety of liveries and their variations, which could seem nearly endless. For example, veteran collector Cecil Gibson wrote as early as 1970 how Tekno in the 1960s made its Volkswagen Transporter panel truck and Ford Taunus vans in many liveries, such as the Dutch Amstel Beer, and for Scandinavian products such as the Politiken newspaper, or the more well known Scania. Tekno's Scania and Volvo trucks were also offered with a variety of advertising on their flanks. In fact, Tekno may have been the earliest diecast company to focus on promotional products, perhaps even earlier than Winross Models' diecast trucks out of Rochester, New York - known in the United States for having many promotional variations.

Tekno had already in 1935 agreements with Falck, concerning advertising of tinplate cars. A more commercial use of advertisements on toy cars started with the Volkswagen van in 1953.

Tekno boxes were normally rather dull, usually being red with illustrations of the cars on the sides. Earlier boxes showed illustrations of cars in various street scenes. Some of the colors could be brighter, however, as with the chartreuse color used on boxes introducing "Fingertip Styring" (sic). Oddly, a 'cut-off' hand appeared apparently out of the sky to touch and guide the car along. Through the 1960s, boxes became more simple as cars were portrayed with apertures closed - and then open on the opposite side. The red box flaps showed the car in a yellow or white band across the center of the flap, or boxes were red on one side and blue on the other. Later, and like the rest of the industry, plastic window boxes with white and red trim became commonplace, putting some talented graphic artists out of work.

== Copies and comparisons ==
Normally producing in 1:43 scale, Tekno's principal rivals were Corgi Toys and Dinky Toys. Models produced often mimicked their offerings, like the Commer estate or the later Oldsmobile Toronado, both models made by Corgi. Still, Tekno always had a personality all its own, offering unique vehicles (particularly those Swedish Saabs and Volvos). One example was the 1970 Volvo 144 police sedan or the Saab 99. Another was the Chevrolet Corvair Monza GT concept vehicle, produced in several colors — later reproduced by Auto Pilen of Spain. Some Tekno original tooling for 1960s Tekno models was also sold to Dalia of Spain, like several Volvo, Ford, and Lincoln models.

In contrast with most other diecast car producers, Tekno did not give in to the temptation of low friction, flashy wheels on their vehicles. Though the company remained loyal to its roots in producing more realistic models, this was not good for sales. Gradually, the variety of cars and other vehicles gave way to marketing only diecast trucks –often still for promotional purposes. At least this strategy helped the company survive, though more in the mode of German Conrad or NZG.

Some earlier models suffered occasionally from zinc pest and warping or bending chassis (perhaps from moldings that were unreinforced), but, overall, Tekno vehicles were of high quality finish.

== Later history ==
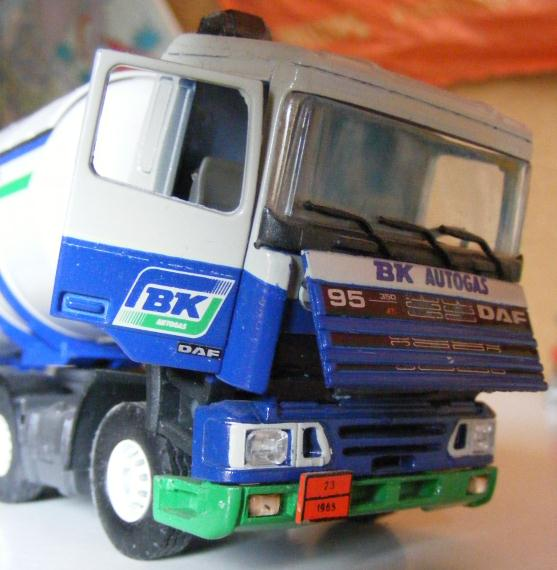
Details of a Tekno DAF 95 cab

Some Tekno cars were marketed in the United States by Kayeff, Inc. of Arcadia, California in blister packages. Unlike Lonestar Toys sold in the U.S. by Physio-Chem, which did not advertise the Lonestar name on packaging, the Kayeff cars proudly displayed the Tekno logo on the blister and stated boldly "It's from Denmark!" with the Danish flag and crown prominently shown. The cars were more likely to be colored in more "spectra-flame"-type colors, perhaps in an attempt to compete with Mattel's Hot Wheels. One of these was reported to have sold for US$800.

MPC also marketed some Tekno trucks and cars as MPC. These were castings made by Kirk. They were advertised as "Strip 'n Steer Metal Precision Trucks" as they could be taken apart and re-assembled.

Sometime in the late 1960s, Tekno models were also offered through a special mail order ad by Road and Track magazine.

== Tekno Holland ==
Tekno ceased making toys in 1972. In 1974, Tekno tooling was sold to a Dutch firm called Vanmin, BV, controlled by Leslie Hurle Bath, an English businessman. Thus Tekno, with the name "Tekno Toys" continued as a firm in The Netherlands. In 1989, due to the promotional and adult collector focus of Teknos offerings, the word "Toys" was dropped from the name. As of 2017, the company was still in business, mainly making truck models with a variety of promotional liveries, though Force claims Tekno was defunct as of 2002.

=== Bibliography ===
- Dickson, Thomas. 2006. Dansk Design. Sydney, Australia: Murdock Books.
- Force, Edward. 2002. Classic Miniature Vehicles of Northern Europe. Atglen, Pennsylvania: Schiffer Publications. ISBN 0764317881
- Gardiner, Gordon; and Richard O'Neill. 1996. The Collector's Guide to Toy Cars: An International Survey of Tinplate and Diecast Cars from 1900. London: Salamander Books Ltd. ISBN 0-517-15977-5.
- Gibson, Cecil. 1970. Commercial Vehicles. Troy Model Club Series. London: Thomas Nelson and Sons Ltd.
- Hobby Talk. 2008. Volvos from Tekno and Vilmer. Forum for Diecast Collectors.
- Ilich, Ray. 1995-2000. Pontonobilia Variants - Tekno Ambulance. Mercedes Benz Ponton website.
- Rixon, Peter. 2005. Miller's Collecting Diecast Vehicles. London: Miller's, A publication of Mitchell Beazley.
- Sinclair, David. 1979. Scale 1/43, A Survey for Collectors. Automobile Quarterly, Vol. 17: pp. 384–399. Princeton, New Jersey: Published in Association with the Princeton Institute for Historic Research.
- Tekno Dansk Legetojs Industri, 1928-1953. 1953. 25th Anniversary Celebration Booklet. 1 September. Shown on the Tekno Samleren (Tekno Collector) website. teknosamleren.dk
- Official Tekno website; tekno.nl
