= NZG =

NZG may refer to:

- NZG Models, a German toy manufacturer
- Nederlandsch Zendeling Genootschap, a Dutch missionary society
- New Zealand Gazette, a government publication
