= Gama Toys =

Former German toy manufacturer

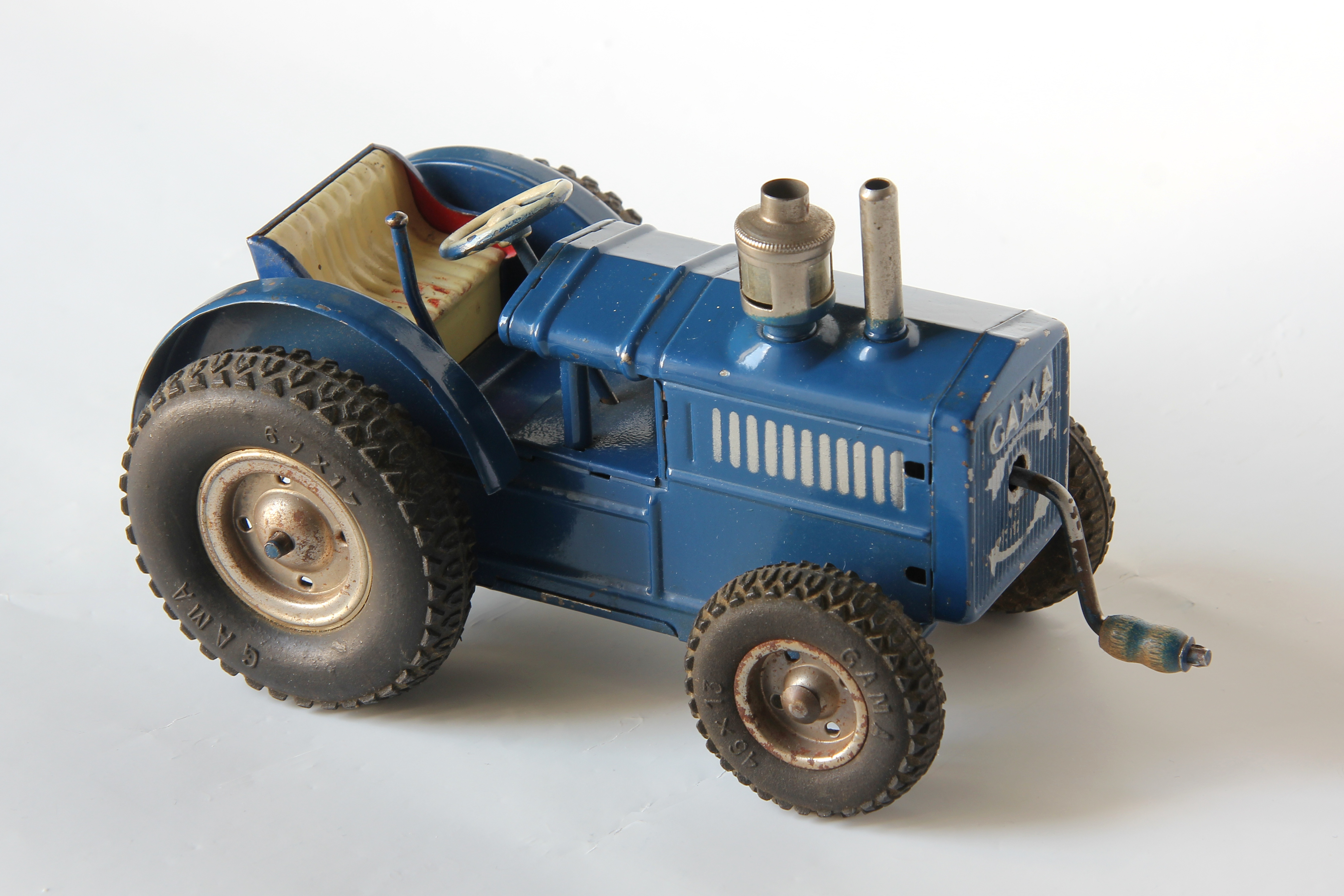
Gama tin toys wind-up tractor from the mid-1950s.

Gama is a German maker of toys and model cars, usually cars and trucks, headquartered in Fürth, Bavaria. Its main competitors on the German market were Schuco, Siku, Schabak and Conrad.

== History ==
According to Edward Force, Gama is the acronym for Georg Adam MAngold, who started the company in Fürth in 1882 making tinplate mechanical toys. Most toy production up through World War II and up until the late 1950s was lithographed tinplate.

In the early 1940s, toy tanks were popular and offered in various sizes including 3.5 and 7 inches in length. The destruction of World War II disrupted production as with other German makers such as Märklin and Schuco.

In the late 1940s, production was started again under the auspices of the U.S. which controlled this sector of the country. Gama made tinplate or pressed steel trucks of various sizes (8 and 14 inch sizes were common), and they were often stamped, "Made in U.S. Zone Germany".

In 1994, after its company closure, Gama Toys purchased by Siku Toys and absorbed into Siku Toys.

== Into the 1960s ==
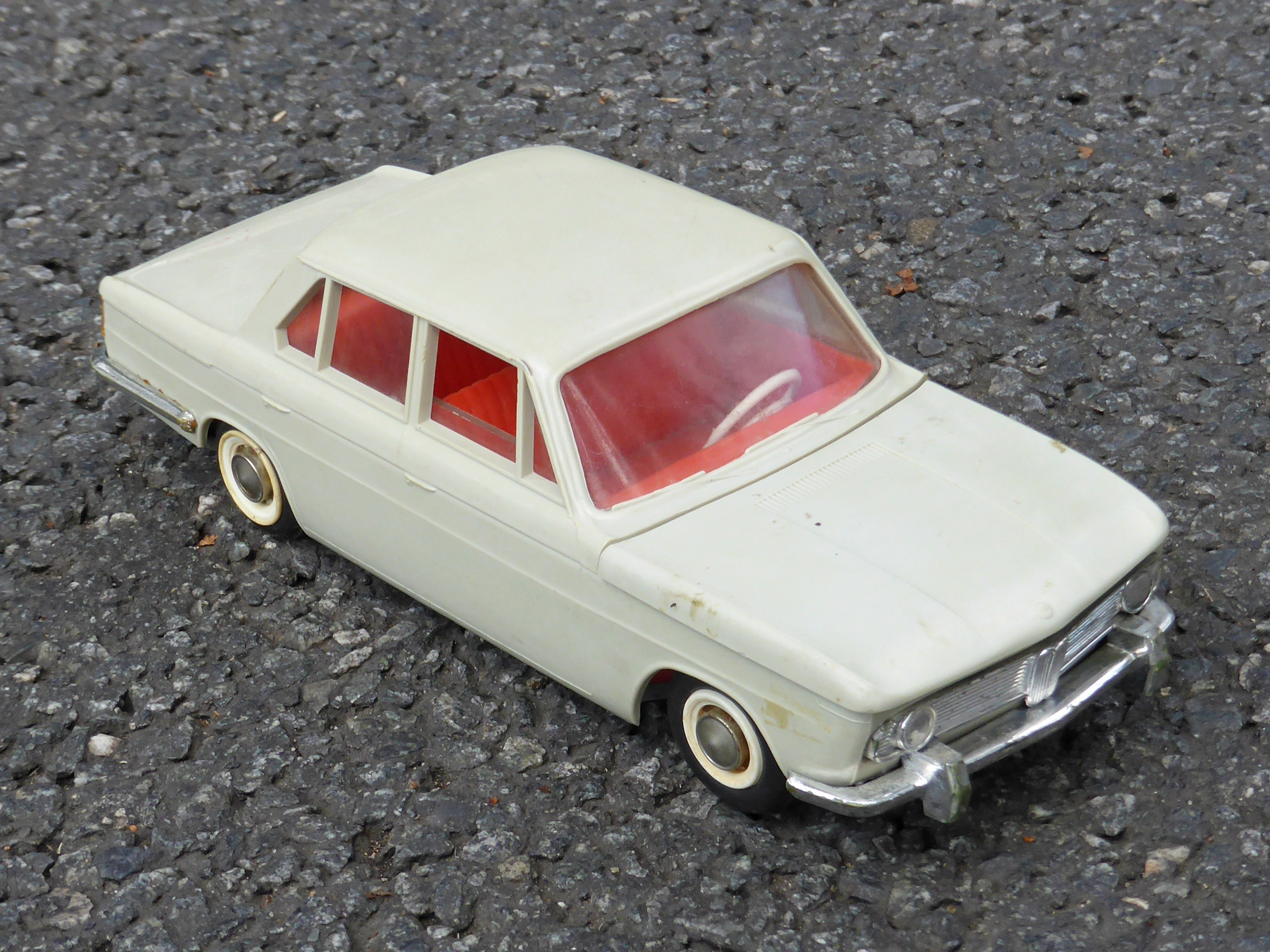
Gama plastic toy BMW 1800 in 1:21 scale from the 1960s.

Gama also made tin friction and plastic cars through the 1960s, like the 1950s Auto Union look-alike which was not very clever in form – having a 'flattened' driver stamped into the metal. Later tinplate vehicles like the 1950s Cadillac and Aston Martin were fairly accurate compared to the real cars. Trucks and motorcycles were also made – usually around 10 inches long, but many were smaller. One example made around 1950 was a 6 inch long motorcycle ridden by a chimp in a circus suit. Many were wind-up/clockwork in operation. Other more traditional toys, like a donkey ridden by a clown – or more fantastical, like spaceships, were also produced.

In the early 1960s, the company moved to plastic injection, which increased the ability to reproduce realistic detail, but reduced durability. Plastic friction powered cars like the well-rendered Ford Taunus 17M two-door station wagon were very nicely proportioned and detailed. Though the bodies were plastic, bases remained pressed tinplate, or pressed steel.

Like Schuco, remote control models were common, both cars and trucks, and some were made even as large as 1:12 scale. Both companies made F1 vehicles, like Gama's 12.5 inch long Matra F1 car with wavy 'spaghetti'-like exhaust pipes flowing backward over the rear engine. In the 1960s and 1970s, several slot cars were made called "Gama Rallye". These were unique in that they could do a 180° spin and drive on in opposite direction. They were not interchangeable with other slot car tracks, and featured a special hook that would keep them affixed to the track. Scales of the slot cars were 1:24, 1:32, and 1:40. Cars in the Gama Rallye series were the Opel GT, Porsche C6, Porsche 910, Porsche Carrera RSR, Ferrari GTO, McClaren CanAm, Matra and other Formula One selections.

Thus over the years Gama made a wide variety of vehicles in both metal and plastic. Many different scales were used and fidelity of reproduction varied from more realistic and promotional in form, to more toylike.

== The Diecast Era ==
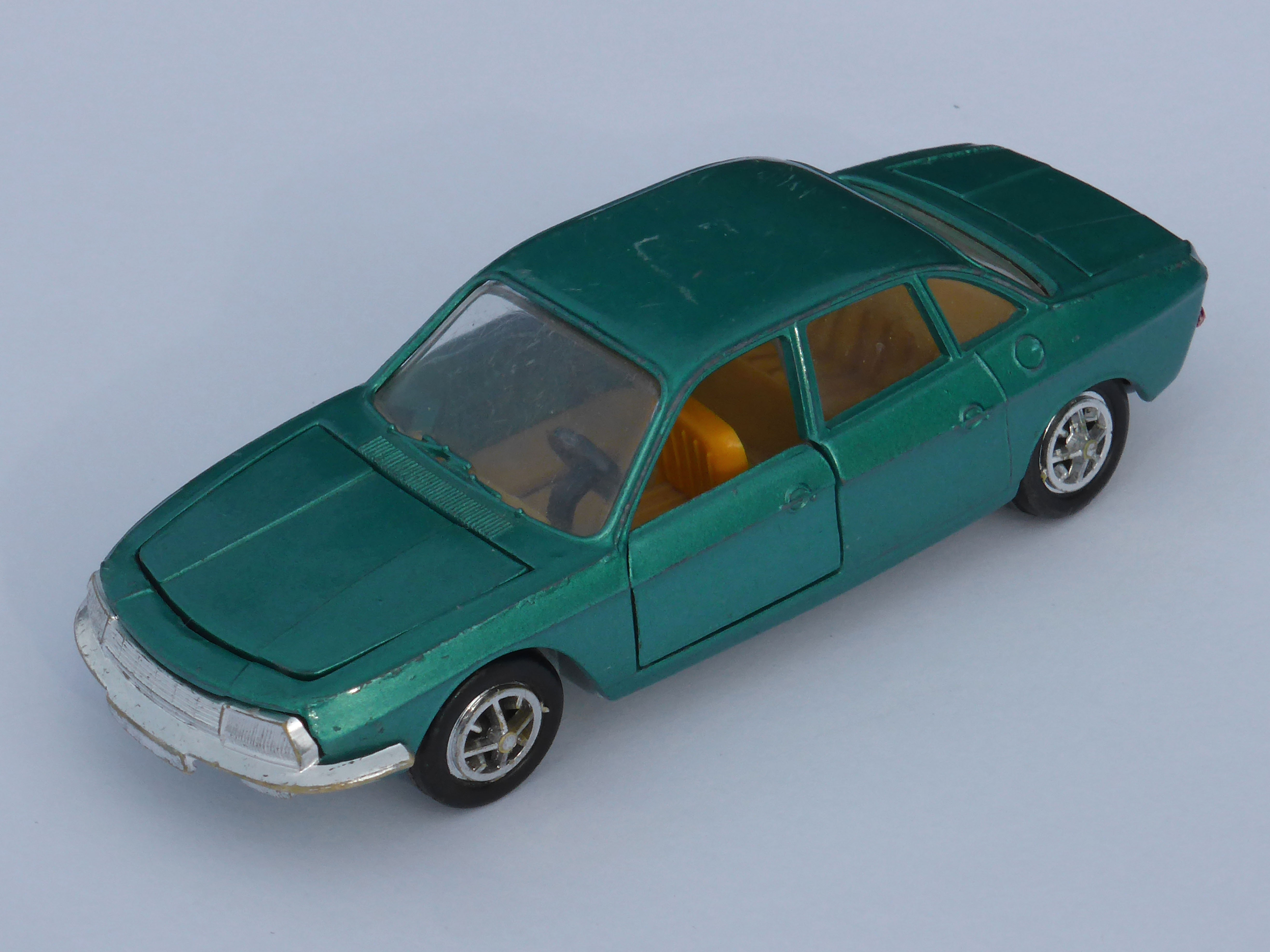
Gama diecast toy NSU Ro 80 in 1:43 scale from the 1970s.

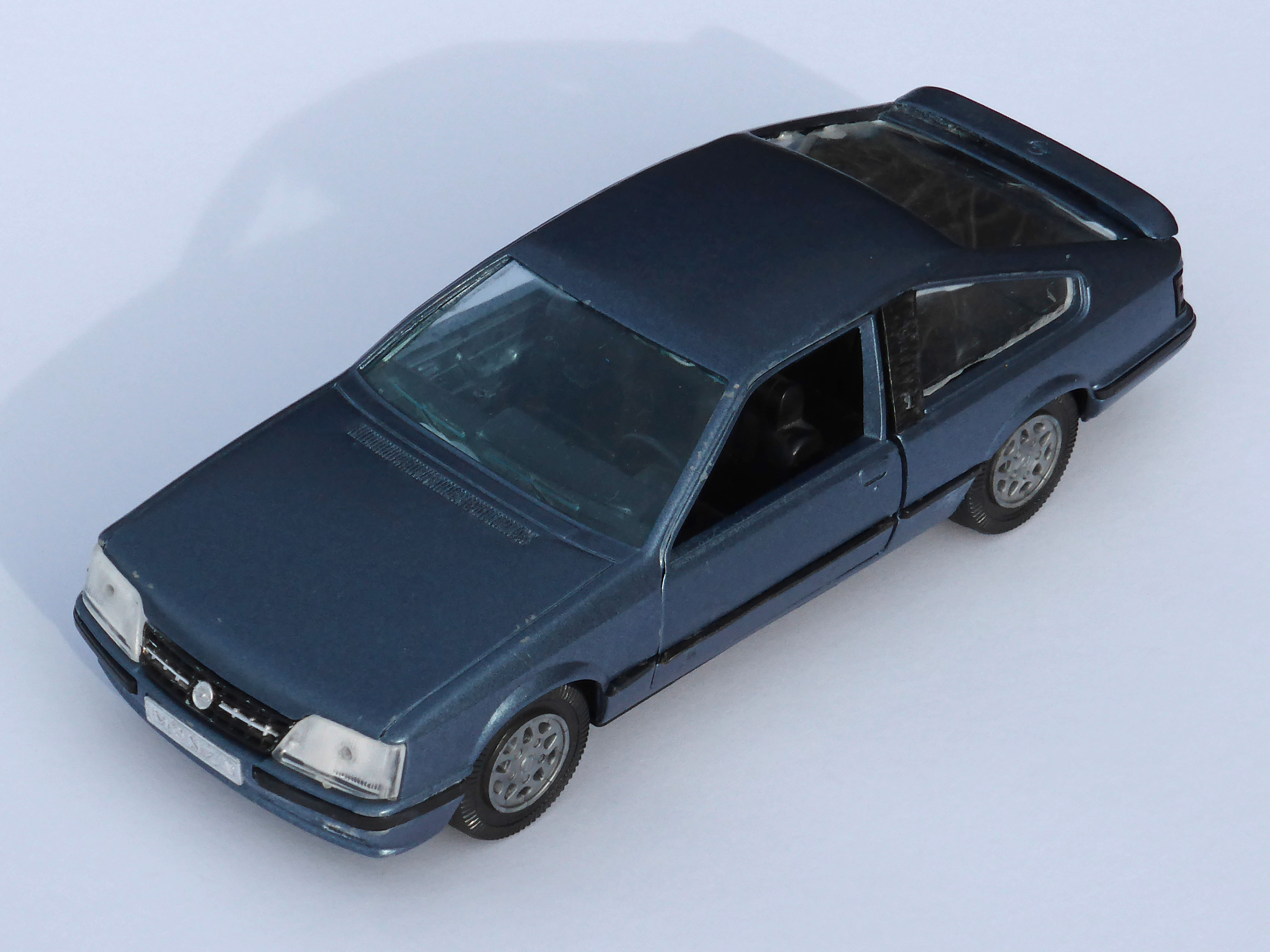
Gama diecast toy Opel Monza in 1:25 scale from the 1980s.

=== Model details ===
As stated by Force, Gama metal 1:42 or 1:43 scale vehicles were introduced in 1959, rather late compared to several mainstream European brands like Corgi and Dinky, but about the same period as many French and Italian models. During the 1960s, to distinguish the smaller diecasts from larger slot cars and remote control vehicles, Gama introduced its main line called "MiniMods" (Mini Models). These were very Corgi-like with plain aluminum wheels and rubber tires. While bodies were diecast, chassis were often plastic, a money saving feature that would be common throughout most diecast company lines some twenty years later. Other Minimod details were distinct, like the flat chrome 'rivet' headlights on the VW Transporter van, though early to mid-1960s cars' headlights were jeweled, which competitors Schuco and Solido avoided. Later models, however, like the BMW 7 Series from about 1990 (a very promotional looking model) had much more authentic looking clear plastic lenses. Other later models, like the BMW M1 Supercar were offered in Rally (with air spoiler and rear wing) as well as regular stock versions. These BMWs also had folding 'hidden' headlights.

Gama did not stick firmly to 1:43 scale and some 1:25 scale vehicles were produced. The company, however, did not seem to go with the 1:35 scale often seen with the companies that more commonly produced promotional models like NZG, Cursor, and Conrad. Gama even produced a Matchbox sized Minette series – which did not last very long. Minettes were attractive, however, even if the wheels were simple thin black plastic. Typical of many manufacturers in tough competition with each other, Gama vehicles started with rubber tires and later hard plastic 'fast' wheels.

=== Gama offerings ===
Gama did not seem as regular or uniform in its offerings compared to other diecast companies who may have been better at marketing. Like Siku, Corgi or Dinky, Gama made a wide variety of cars, trucks, construction, and commercial vehicles in diecast. These included recreational vehicles like the rounded Tabert Senator trailer, DKW 'Schwimmwagen' type Jeep, fork lifts and skid steers, or the Porsche ORBIT Sectional Hydraulic Platform which actually squirt water. Some of these were similar to Gescha, NZG or Conrad, but Gama always seemed more oriented to toys and didn't seem to penetrate the truck promotional market like these companies did. Gama usually produced German brands such as BMW, Mercedes-Benz, Audi, and Volkswagen – Faun was a common truck brand.

In the late 1970s, Gama introduced its diecast old car series, once again applying the "MiniMods" name, but now only used for these models that were similar to Matchbox Models of Yesteryear. A brightly colored box style was used (see photo above) that hinted of the 1920s or 1930s design. Sometimes the castings were a bit crude, but often the selection was interesting like the three wheeled German postal van. The similarity to Yesteryear models was evident in simpler detail, dull precision and size, but instead of British selections, the focus was on classic cars of the European mainland.

Though Gamas are usually as detailed and finely rendered as Schucos or Marklins, they don't seem to carry the same respect from collectors. Perhaps this sentiment comes from the diecast seconds sold to other countries and brand 'inter-breeding' which makes identification of true or original Gamas problematic.

== Brand Inter-breeding ==
Gamas have appeared in other countries as dies have been sold. For example, a battery operated Gama 1:12 scale plastic Opel GT later appeared marketed by the Greek firm 'Ellas' by the Gavrielides Bros. The MIR Toy factory in Mir, Bulgaria (later to become Mikro'67; see website below), reproduced about 20 different Gama vehicles through the 1990s, in several colors. Sometimes they were packaged with "Made in Germany" still marked on their bases – but after a time the country designation was gradually removed. The diecast Micro'67 Opel GT, in 1:41 scale, for example, does not say the manufacturer on the base, but does say 'Made in Bulgaria' on the box.

Also, Force points out that, especially after Gama purchased Schuco in the mid-1980s, company model offerings were not brand unique. The firm often, with lack of discretion, marketed other manufacturers' toys. Schuco models were dumped, without much change, directly into Gama boxes and Conrad Models, Norev, and Nacoral dies would appear as Gamas, virtually unchanged. Some of the Micro'67 models made in Bulgaria also appeared in Gama boxes back in Germany.

Japanese toy manufacturer Bandai before made Gundam plastic models (GunPla) in 1980s licensed and marketed German Gama Toys products in Japan from 1962 to 1986.

Unlike other brands like Polistil, Corgi, or Dinky, Gama models were produced and marketed across multiple countries, making their classification and collection more complex. Models manufactured outside Germany are often treated as products of distinct companies rather than as par of the Gamma range.

== Gama Recently ==
Gama seems to have survived at least through the mid-1990s. Recently, however, it seems to have been less prevalent in the diecast market, though some of the 'Gama Rallye' offerings are reported to have been reproduced around 2005.

The Gama name also appeared in catalogs of the Czech company known as Gonio that produced pressed tin 1:24 scale military vehicles about 2000. The address printed on the company literature shows the name as "Gama, a.s. Ceske Budejovice" which appears to be a continuation of production within the Gonio factory in Trhove Sviny. Gonio had made models in the early 1990s and later, about 2003, was taken over by Kaden models. The story of how the Gama name came to be applied to Gonio and, later, Kaden, is uncertain.

== Bibliography ==
- Force, Edward (1990). Classic Miniature Vehicles Made in Germany (1st ed.). West Chester PA: Schiffer Publishing. p. 91. ISBN 9780887402517.
- Gardiner, Gordon; O'Neill, Richard (1996). The Collector's Guide to Toy Cars: An International Survey of Tinplate and Diecast Cars from 1900. London: Salamander Books. ISBN 0-517-15977-5.
- Rixon, Peter (2005). Miller's Collecting Diecast Vehicles. London: Mitchell Beazley. ISBN 9781845330309.
