= Lintoy =

Die cast toy brand

Lintoy was a brand of die cast toys produced in the 1970s and 1980s from Hong Kong, owned by a man named David Lin.

Known for their die-cast airplanes, which included both military and commercial airline (such as Braniff International and American Airlines) editions, the line also produced die-cast cars and toy tool sets.

In 1979–1980 Lintoy made three models of Dinky Toys for Meccano Ltd.

Lintoy toys were distributed to various parts of the world. In the United States, they were distributed by Ertl and Bachmann Industries. At one time, the brand became known as "Bachmann/Lintoy".

== See also ==
- Dyna-Flytes
- Matchbox (brand)
- Hot Wheels
- Matchbox Skybusters
- Schabak
