= Dyna-Flytes =

Dyna-Flites was a brand of die-cast toy model airplanes sold in the 1970s, '80s and '90s by Zee Toys of California. The line was part of a series of Dyna die-cast products that included toy cars, construction vehicles, bikes and tanks. The Dyna-Flites range included 79 aircraft with over 206 color and marking variations released until production ceased in 1996.

== Corporate basis, manufacturing arrangements, branding and product range ==
ZEE Toys of Hong Kong produced the line, and the US distribution was picked up by Intex in 1981. Intex would remain the US distributor until 1992, when ZEE would assume direct US distribution. The toys themselves were manufactured in Hong Kong. Although generally released as Dyna-Flites, their branding was changed to suit some international markets. Modern Toys of Japan distributed them as "Hot Wings"; "Superwings" in the United Kingdom and in Australia; "Vento Caldo" in Italy and "Hot Wings" elsewhere. These early "Hot Wings" issues must not be confused with the current "Hot Wings" line from another vendor although it does include some ZEE moulds. The Dyna-Flite line consisted of a variety of subjects, including many WWII airplanes (including a "WWII Historical Series" in 1996 with new colors), modern jets both from the US, Europe and the Soviet Union, a biplane and a number of helicopters.

Most models featured raised rivets or moulded-in lines and relatively robust 'dumbbell-type' metal wheels. Unfortunately, the rotors and clear parts of earlier helicopters (especially the Bell 47) were made from very brittle plastic that broke easily during play. Zee took action to fix this with later releases (e.g. the Kaman Seasprite) by changing the rotors to flexible vinyl.

== Marketing ==
Dyna-Flites reached their peak in the late 1980s, with most mass retailers carrying the line (including Target, Woolworths/Woolco, WalMart and ToysRUs in the United States, and K-Mart, Toy World and Franklins in Australia). They were often available for purchase for $1 or less each, a feature that often saw them marketed as an impulse purchase line at checkouts and newsagents. Dyna-Flites were also sold in at least two dedicated aircraft giftsets, as well as other giftsets with various themes (e.g. the Emergency and Police Giftsets included H-19 and the Bell-47 or Cayuse helicopters, respectively). Notably, the Dyna-Flites Bell 47 and Chinook helicopters were released in a variety of forms under a media tie-in with the M*A*S*H franchise.

Dyna-Flites has been credited with being the first brand that had commercial airlines license them to produce die-cast models for them. Among the airlines that had models released by Dyna-Flites included FedEx, Delta Air Lines, Eastern Air Lines, Pan Am, TWA and Braniff. Additional airlines in the Dyna-Flite range included Austrian, Hawaiian, ANA, Japan Airlines, BOAC, United Airlines CP Airlines, Western Airlines, KLM, British Airways and more. However, ZEE did issue an authorized gift set for United Air Lines in 1993.

== Demise and current product releases by Red Box Toys ==
ZEE Toys ceased production in 1996, but the line was purchased by Red Box Toys of Hong Kong in 1997. Production continues to this day, but are sold under the brand Hot Wings, In Air and sometimes under generic brands, often with cast-in marks removed. Former Dyna-Flites pieces can be identified by the "Axxx" reference number moulded into the body. Twenty six of the original moulds have now been retired, being either updated or replaced by other subjects. Red Box Toys went on to release 3 new pieces in 1999 which continued the series' numbering sequence. Those aircraft were an F-19, U-2 'Senior Span' and Me 262. The Me 262 was a new cast, not re-release of the earlier mold in the line. In 2006 Red Box added four WWII Japanese aircraft to the line up. They were released in at least 3 different color combinations: A180 Ki-45 Nick A181 B5N2 Kate A182 Ki-43 Oscar A183 D4Y3 Judy

Zee also released a line called "Super Dyna-Flites", which can be distinguished by a mould numbering sequence of "A2xx". Some of these aircraft continue to be released in the In Air and Hot Wings lines. Often these 3rd party releases include the original ZEE cast in identifiers; sometimes it is edited and on some it is removed entirely.

== List of Dyna Flites aircraft by manufacturing number and sales name ==
Some aircraft in the Dyna-Flites series were issued using an incorrect name (e.g. the Sikorsky S-55 was actually an S-58) or omitted the manufacturer's name (e.g. the 'Huey copter' is correctly a Bell UH-1B Iroquois/Huey). In addition, some moulds were withdrawn and their number assigned to a new mould. Additionally, a number of the early casts were retired and replaced with newer, finer casts. This would include the B707 and B727 as examples. Some details are provided in brackets after each aircraft's entry. It should also be noted that the original issue numbers did NOT include the "A" suffix. This would become standard in later years, but it is also a way to distinguish between the A102 F-100 and its replacement, the A102A C-5 Galaxy. In time ZEE would use different suffixes to distinguish different paint releases. For instance the A106 DC-3 would eventually be issued with A, B, C and D suffix versions. These suffixes were not included (except for the A) on the item itself, but were listed in catalogs. For clarity the suffix' are deleted from the following list.

The identity of the A113 biplane is not resolved. It was officially released as a "SPAD", although the cast looks more like a Sopwith Camel. It would return in a variety of guises over the years, with its final release coming as a "Crop Duster". It is the only biplane in the line. NB: Errors exist in the following list. It is both exclusionary and contains some spurious information. It is also incomplete to later issues and liveries. This list is only good through the end of ZEE ownership in 1996.

- A100 Sikorsky S-55 (actually a S-58/SH-34; variably released with a 3- or 4-bladed main rotor in an orange USN scheme)
- A101 Junkers Ju 87
- A102 Super Sabre F-100C (reference number later assigned to C-5A Galaxy)
- A102 C-5A Galaxy
- A103 F-84 Thunderstreak (reference number later assigned to DC-9)
- A103 DC-9 (Hawaiian Airlines)
- A104 Concorde (Air France, Pan Am; reference number later assigned to Sikorsky HH-3E)
- A104 Sikorsky HH-3E (USAF Pelican and USN markings)
- A105 Boeing 747 (Braniff, Flying Tigers Airlines, Pan Am, TWA, United States of America, United)
- A106 Boeing SST (reference number later assigned to DC-3)
- A106 DC-3 (CP-Air) (A glider variant was also produced by Zylmex, the XCG-17)
- A107 Boeing 727 (Braniff, Delta Air Lines, Eastern, Western, All Nippon Airways, Japan Airlines)
- A108 P-51D Mustang
- A109 P-38 Lightning
- A110 F-104 J/G Starfighter
- A111 OV-10 Bronco (reference number later assigned to MiG 27)
- A111 MiG 27
- A112 Huey copter (UH-1B Iroquois/Huey)
- A113 "SPAD"
- A114 Zero (Mitsubishi A6M)
- A115 Douglas DC-10 (American Airlines, Fed Ex, also released in USAF KC-10 Extender markings, Northwest Orient, TWA)
- A116 Corsair F4U
- A117 Messerschmit ME 262 A (number later assigned to E2A Hawkeye)
- A117 E2A Hawkeye (Grumman)
- A118 F-4C/D Phantom II
- A119 Spitfire IX
- A120 Vickers VC-10
- A121 Hughes OH-6A Cayuse (Hughes 500. Incorrectly had a 3-bladed main rotor)
- A122 Boeing/Vertol CH-54 Chinook (also released under M*A*S*H branding as a 'cargo copter')
- A123 Messerschmitt BF109E (originally released as a black plane with "Good Goose" markings)
- A124 MIG-21 (number later assigned to F/A-18 Hornet)
- A124 F-18 Hornet (F/A-18 is correct designation)
- A125 F-105
- A126 Mirage IV (Dassault)
- A127 L-1011 (Eastern Airlines, Pan Am, Air Pacific)
- N127 Lockheed SR-71 (one-off departure from the Axxx numbering system)
- A128 Boeing 707 (in United Airlines, Lufthansa, Continental and Trans Euro markings)
- A129 AJ-37 Viggen
- A130 A-4E Skyhawk
- A131 Bell Cobra (AH-1 Hueycobra)
- A132 Hunter F.6
- A133 Cessna 337 Skymaster
- A134 Cessna A-37A (number later replaced by B-1)
- A134 B-1
- A135 HU-16B Albatross (number later assigned to Gee Bee Sportster)
- A135 Gee Bee R-11 Super Sportster
- A136 P-40 Tomahawk
- A137 H-19 Sikorsky (in at least two USCG markings)
- A138 MIG-25 Foxbat
- vA139 Sikorsky CH-54 Skycrane (including hospital pod)
- A140 Bell Rescue (Bell 47G; Axxx number was not moulded on the aircraft. Released in yellow civil, Police and M*A*S*H markings)
- A141 B-52 Stratofortress
- A142 A-10 Warthog
- A143 F-14 Tomcat
- A144 F-16 Falcon
- A145 F-15 Eagle
- A146 Harrier
- A147 Kaman LAMPS (Kaman SH-2 Seasprite in USN markings)
- A148 Space Shuttle
- A149 HH-60D Nighthawk
- A150 Grumman X-29A
- A151 Stealth Fighter (concept aircraft)
- A152 EF-111 Raven
- A153 MIG-29 Fulcrum
- A154 AV-8B Harrier
- A155 EA-6A Intruder
- A156 S-3 Viking
- A157 F-117A Stealth Fighter
- A158 YF-22
- A159 B-17E Flying Fortress
- A160 Mirage 2000
- A161 Tornado
- A162A P-47 (Shown in the 1996 catalog but never released)

== See also ==
- Matchbox Skybusters
- Herpa Wings
- Schabak
- Lintoy
- Aeroclassics
