= Gescha Toys =

Toy manufacturer in Nuremberg, Germany

Gescha was the name of a toy manufacturer established in Nuremberg, Germany in 1923. Sometime around 1980, the name was changed to Conrad Models, after the family that owned the company.

== History ==
Tin toys, plates, and other products made in Germany between 1900 and 1920 were often marked Ges. Gesch. (gesetzlich geschützt), which means "registered trademark" in German, but the mark often seems to be mistaken as the name of a toy brand. While the Gescha toy company was reportedly established in 1923, and toys on today's antiques market stamped with the name 'Gescha' date from the mid-1930s, it is uncertain whether this name of the toys was inspired by the copyright abbreviation.

Tin toys made before the 1940s that bear the mark "Gesch" thus are often mistaken for toys made by the Gescha toy company, when in fact they are toys made by other companies and only marked "registered." The earliest made Gescha toys bear the words "Gescha Patent" written in English (for example, on the grille of a toy tractor) and on packaging labeled for foreign markets. The name confusion is then probably related to German toys sold in other than German language markets.

Gescha has a long history of toy manufacturing similar to Schuco or Gama Toys. Most of its early products were tin wind-up toys creatively designed to move in a variety of ways.

One example is the wind-up bellhop that pushes a large trunk along a flat surface. Another is the tin butterfly. These may be toys made by a variety of manufacturers bearing the German registration mark. The confusion between the trademark and the name of the company greatly complicates the process of determining which toys were specifically made by the Gescha company.

== Post World War II ==
As with most German industries, World War II seriously disrupted or halted business. In the late 1940s and early 1950s, Gescha still made a wide variety of tin and stamped toys, but began to focus on making vehicles.

Among these were a windup tractor and trailer, colorful four-inch buses, airplanes, tanks, cars, and a variety of other vehicles. Among these was a Porsche speedster-like sports car, very much in line with the post-war tin Shuco or Gama tradition.

== Approaching Diecast ==
Sometime in the 1960s, Gescha started making various toys and models for several different brand names. One of these was Conrad Models, named after the family that owned the company. The name Conrad appeared as early as the late 1950s. Another name was Strenco, which may have been a separate company purchased by Gescha at some point.

Gescha entered the realm of diecasting zamac around this time. The company began to specialize in a variety of cast metal heavy equipment vehicles like road graders, front loaders, bulldozers, etc. This began a new trend that exploded during the 1980s and 1990s, the making of sophisticated diecast vehicles as promotional items for heavy equipment manufacturers. Gescha appears to have blazed this trail as a new model toy specialty niche, with the newly established NZG Models close at its heels.

== Forgetting Gescha ==
During the 1970s, the name Conrad began to be used more and Gescha used less. By 1980, toys bearing the name Gescha were rare. Around this time the name Conrad began to be used exclusively; the company's website does not even mention the name of Gescha.

The business approach of Conrad is similar to that of NZG Models, also of Nuremberg. They compete globally for contracts to make precision models for truck, crane, and other heavy equipment manufacturers (see Conrad website listed below). The Conrad Models company was started under the name Gescha.
