= 1:50 scale =

Size for die-cast models

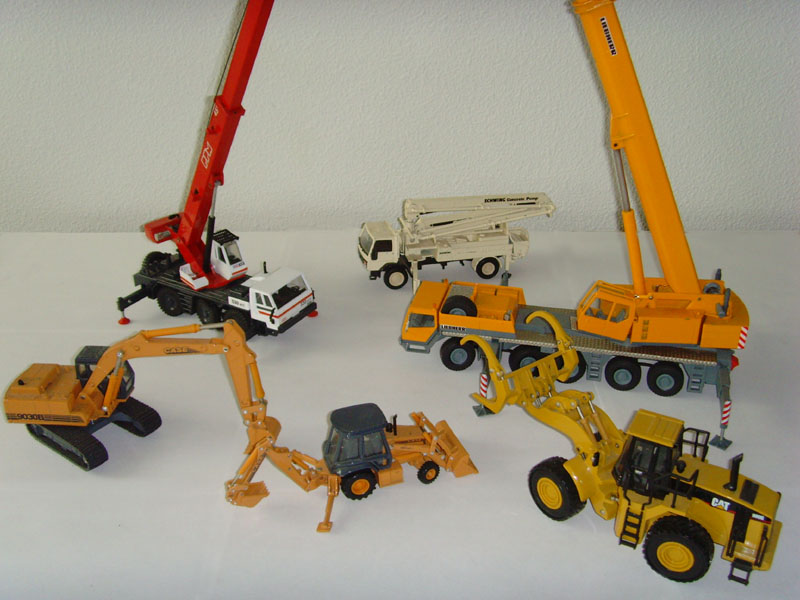
1:50 scale diecast construction equipment

1:50 scale is a popular size for diecast models from European manufacturers such as Conrad, Tekno, NZG, WSI and LionToys. Typically they produce scale models of construction vehicles, tower cranes, trucks and buses. These are often the official models distributed by the manufacturers of the real vehicles as a promotional items for prospective customers. These models are also very popular in Europe despite their small size compared to stamped metal construction toys which are usually found in the US.

This scale is similar to O scale used in model trains and 1:50 scale will appear compatible with 1:48 scale models as produced by US manufacturers of O scale model trains and some makers of military vehicles (especially aircraft).

== See also ==
- Scale model
- Diecast toy
- Model car
- Model construction vehicle
- Rail transport modelling scales
- Model railway scales
