= Schuco Varianto Toys =

Tinplate toy road system

Schuco Varianto
- Type: Guided tinplate toy / Model road system
- Invented by: Heinrich Müller
- Company: Schuco (Schreyer & Co.)
- Country: West Germany
- Materials: Lithographed tinplate, steel wire, rubber

Schuco Varianto was a miniature tinplate toy road system manufactured by the West German toy company Schuco (Schreyer & Co.) in Nuremberg from 1951 to 1966. Invented by Schuco co-founder Heinrich Müller, the system featured clockwork-driven and electric miniature vehicles guided along customizable layouts using a flexible, coiled steel spring wire track.

Marketed as an affordable alternative to electric model railways, the Varianto system allowed users to construct intricate road networks featuring intersections, automated garages, gas stations, bridge overpasses, and turntables. The technology behind Varianto is widely recognized by toy historians as a precursor to modern slotless guided road systems, such as the Faller Car System.

== History ==
Following World War II, Nuremberg re-emerged as a major international center for toy manufacturing. In 1951, Schuco introduced the Varianto series under the leadership of engineer Heinrich Müller. The concept was designated as an "automatic traffic game" (Automatisches Verkehrsspiel), designed to capitalize on the rapid expansion of highway infrastructure and automotive culture in post-war Europe.

Unlike traditional tinplate cars, which operated either unguided on flat floors or on fixed rigid metal tracks, Varianto introduced a proprietary spiral-wire guide system (Spiraldraht-Spurführung). This allowed complex, multi-lane roadway layouts to be assembled quickly on playboards or domestic tables without requiring permanent track mounting.

In the mid-1950s, Schuco expanded the lineup with the introduction of Elektro-Varianto, incorporating battery-powered electric motors alongside the traditional clockwork mechanisms.

Production of the Varianto line continued until approximately 1966. As consumer preferences shifted toward smaller die-cast zinc alloy vehicles (such as Matchbox and Corgi Toys) and cheaper plastic construction, tinplate manufacturing declined, leading Schuco to phase out the Varianto system in favor of their Micro Racer and Piccolo die-cast lines.

== Mechanical design and operation ==
The Varianto system relied on a mechanical guidance system integrated into the chassis and track components.

=== Guide wire track ===
The core technical component of the system was the guide track, constructed from tightly coiled steel spring wire (Spiraldraht). The natural flexibility of the coiled wire allowed users to form smooth curves, S-bends, and elevation inclines without kinking the track. Track sections were connected end-to-end using pressed metal joiner tubes.

=== Guidance mechanism ===
Each vehicle was equipped with a spring-loaded, pivoting guide wheel or pin mounted beneath the front bumper. When placed onto the track, the guide pin engaged inside the top groove of the coiled spring wire. As the rear wheels propelled the car forward, the guide pin followed the contour of the wire, mechanically steering the front axle.

=== Drive systems ===
- Clockwork drive (Uhrwerk): Powered by a heavy-duty steel leaf spring motor wound using a removable square-socket key. A multi-position lever protruding from the chassis allowed the operator to select forward speeds, reverse, or stop the vehicle.
- Electric drive (Elektro-Varianto): Powered by an internal 1.5-volt C-cell battery or connected via twin trailing wires to an external handheld battery control box with forward/reverse switching.

=== Remote steering control ===
Select sets included a flexible Bowden cable assembly (Fahrfernsteuerung). Attached to the vehicle's steering mechanism, this cable allowed an operator to manually steer the car or switch gear settings remotely from up to one meter away.

== Product catalog ==
=== Vehicles ===
With the exception of the Volkswagen Beetle (model 3040), Schuco Varianto vehicles were generic mid-century "fantasy models" (Phantasie-Modelle) created by Schuco's in-house designers. Although non-licensed, their styling reflected contemporary West German and American automotive design trends, including ponton sedans, cab-over-engine trucks, and streamlined transit buses.

==== Clockwork series (3040 series) ====
Model No.	Name	Vehicle type and styling	Standard colorways
3040	VW Beetle	Volkswagen Beetle sedan / Polizei	Red, Blue, Green/White (Polizei)
3041	Varianto-Limo	4-door Ponton Sedan (Opel/Borgward style)	Red, Green, Blue, Maroon, Grey, Yellow
3042	Varianto-Lasto	Flatbed Lorry / Truck (Pritschenwagen)	Red cab/grey bed, Green cab/yellow bed
3043	Varianto-Sani	Ambulance (Sanitätswagen) with Red Cross	Cream/White with red cross emblems
3044	Varianto-Bus	City Transit Microbus	Two-tone Green/Cream, Red/Cream
3045	Varianto-Cabriolet	2-seater Roadster (Austin-Healey style)	Red, Blue, Ivory/White
3046	Varianto-Tankwagen	Commercial Fuel Tanker Lorry	Shell (Yellow/Red), Aral (Blue/White), BP (Green/Yellow)
3047	Varianto-Feuerwehr	Fire Engine with extension ladder and bell	Red with silver ladder & brass bell
3048	Varianto-Patrol Car	Highway Patrol / Police Car	Green/White (Polizei), Black/White (Patrol)
3049	Varianto-Express	Commercial Delivery Van / Station Wagon	Dark Blue, Slate Grey
3050	Varianto-Kipper	Utility Dump Truck with tipper bed	Orange cab/grey bed, Red cab/green bed

==== Battery electric series (3110 series) ====
Model No.	Name	Vehicle type
3110	Elektro-Limo	Battery-operated sedan
3112	Elektro-Lasto	Battery-operated flatbed truck
3114	Elektro-Express Van	Battery-operated parcel delivery van (Paketwagen)
3116	Elektro-Tankwagen	Battery-operated fuel tanker (Shell / Aral)
3118	Elektro-Station Car	Battery-operated station wagon / utility vehicle

== Boxed sets ==
Schuco packaged Varianto products individually and in complete boxed sets (Garnituren). Catalog packaging was designated using both single-letter alphabetical codes (3010 A through 3010 Z) and numerical sub-identifiers:

=== Basic and intermediate lettered sets (3010 A – 3010 H) ===
- Set 3010 A (Basic Starter Set): Entry-level outfit containing 1x 3041 Limo (or 3042 Lasto), winding key, remote control cable, 2x spiral guide wires, connectors, and 1x intersection plate (`3010/25`).
- Set 3010 B (Deluxe Starter Set): Compact single-vehicle outfit with added tin tunnel archway (model 3010/3) and extended guide wires.
- Set 3010 C (Two-Car Gift Set): Included 2x vehicles (3041 Limo and 3042 Lasto Truck), winding key, 2x remote cables, crossroads plate, and track wires.
- Set 3010 D (Commercial Transport Set): Featured commercial vehicles (3042 Lasto Truck and 3044 Bus or 3046 Tanker) with extended straight and curved guide wire layouts.
- Set 3010 E (Extended Traffic Set): Included 2 to 3 vehicles, manual track switches (Weichen), crossroads, and serpentine guide wire sections.
- Set 3010 F (Town Traffic Set): Comprehensive municipal set with 3 vehicles (Limo, Truck, Ambulance), traffic signal post (model 3065), and multiple junction plates.
- Set 3010 G (Garage Set / Garagen-Garnitur): Included 2x vehicles, the automatic double garage (model 3060 with trip-wire doors), track switches, and an oval layout.
- Set 3010 H (Gas Station Set / Tankstellen-Garnitur): Included 2x vehicles (3041 Limo and 3046 Tanker), the Shell Gas Station (model 3054), track switches, and a figure-8 wire layout.

=== Extended thematic lettered sets (3010 K – 3010 Z) ===
- Set 3010 K (Kleine Geschenkpackung): Small 2-car gift outfit with tunnel section and intersection plate.
- Set 3010 R (Rennspiel / Speed Set): Oval speed-track layout optimized for high-speed clockwork runs.
- Set 3010 S (Schnell-Autobahn Set): Expressway set featuring extended straight guide wire runs and high-speed bypass switches.
- Set 3010 T (Elektro-Tankstellen-Spiel): Refueling layout combining fuel tanker vehicles (3046/3116), the Shell Gas Station (model 3054), and microbus/limo traffic.
- Set 3010 V (Verkehrsspiel): Large city traffic layout including multiple vehicles (3041 Limo, 3042 Lasto, and 3110 series electrics), traffic lights, and multi-way intersections.
- Set 3010 W (Weichen-Garnitur): Layout set emphasizing multi-lane routing and manual/automatic lane switches.
- Set 3010 X (Autobahn-Garnitur): Multi-level highway layout featuring bridge incline ramps (model 3050) and commercial transport vehicles.
- Set 3010 Y (Gütertransport-Garnitur): Industrial freight set with tipper truck (model 3050), flatbed lorry, and loading/unloading station components.
- Set 3010 Z (Zentral-Verkehrsspiel): Master central city outfit combining the rotating turntable (model 3010/19), central traffic signal, double garage, and gas station.

=== Numerical and master set series ===
- 3010/0 Beginner Set (Grundpackung): Base starter set corresponding to configuration 3010 A.
- 3010/5 Master Set (Große Geschenkpackung / Verkehrsspiel): The flagship box set combining components from sets 3010 V and 3010 Z into a grand multi-vehicle town system.
- 3110/0 & 3110/1 Elektro Outfits: Battery-operated sets containing 1 or 2 electric vehicles, handheld battery control box, trailing electrical lead wires, and insulated guide track.

== Accessories and infrastructure ==
A comprehensive ecosystem of roadside accessories was produced to expand Varianto layouts:

- Shell Gas Station (model 3054): A tinplate gas station building featuring 1950s modern architecture, curved glass canopy, and lithographed fuel pumps.
- Aral Gas Station (model 3055): Variant gas station finished in blue-and-white Aral branding.
- Automatic Double Garage (model 3060): Featured a mechanical trip lever embedded in the entry track; as an approaching vehicle passed over the trigger pin, the double garage doors automatically opened.
- Rotating Turntable (model 3010/19): A circular rotating tin platform used to reverse a vehicle's direction 180 degrees.
- Automatic Stop Station (model 3058): Timed mechanical stop rail that paused a vehicle briefly before releasing it automatically.
- Railroad Crossing Gates (model 3059): Mechanical level crossing featuring twin barrier gates that dropped automatically when a car passed over the trigger wire.
- Traffic Signal (model 3065): Color-changing roadside signal post.

== Collectibility and manufacturing stamps ==
The manufacturing origin stamp on the underside of Varianto vehicle chassis serves as a primary indicator for dating:

- 1951–ca. 1954/55: Stamped "Made in U.S.-Zone Germany", reflecting production in Nuremberg during the Allied occupation of West Germany.
- ca. 1955–1966: Stamped "Made in Western Germany" or "Made in W. Germany".

Due to their mechanical complexity, complete working sets in original packaging (Originalkarton) command high prices among vintage tinplate toy collectors. The model 3048 Patrol Car is documented as the rarest standard production vehicle in the series.

== See also ==
- Schuco
- Tin toy
- Slot car
- Faller Car System
- Nuremberg Toy Fair
