= Conrad Models =

German scale model manufacturer

Conrad GmbH
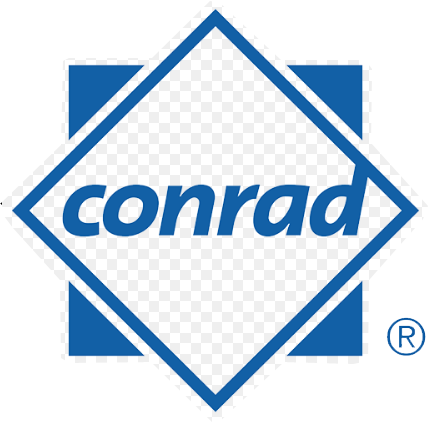
- Company type: GmbH
- Founded: 1923; 102 years ago
- Headquarters: Germany
- Products: Die-cast scale model commercial vehicles
- Website: conrad-modelle.de

Conrad GmbH (previously "Gescha Toys") is a German manufacturer of diecast scale model trucks, primarily in 1:50 scale for use both as toys and promotional models by heavy equipment manufacturers. Conrad is one of the few European diecast companies which have not outsourced production to China or elsewhere in Asia. Conrad Modelle is headquartered in Kalchreuth, just northeast of Nuremberg.

In the past, Conrad also manufactured model cars.

== From Gescha to Conrad ==
On early German toys the abbreviation "Ges. Gesch." was short for the German for "trademark registered". This may have led to the eventual name of the predecessor toy firm of Gescha which was established in 1923. Gescha had previously specialized in wind-up tin toys similar to Schuco Modell or Gama Toys. The Conrad website says that Conrad – a family name – started making diecast models in 1956, however Gescha used the Conrad name as a sub-brand first. Most diecast truck and heavy equipment models, for which Conrad became most well-known, were marketed as Gescha in the 1960s and 1970s. The name Conrad was increasingly used through the 1970s and by about 1980, the Gescha name was discontinued.

The official website says that since 1987 the company has been run by Gunther Conrad assisted by his wife Gerde and their son, Michael. Thus the company has remained a family owned business, probably since about 1956 when the Conrad name was introduced when the Conrad family took control of Gescha.

== Models today ==
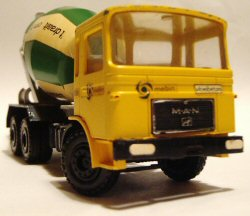
Conrad MAN cement truck

Conrad today has a line of over 90 separate models, mostly trucks and cranes. The appearance and finish of the diecast models themselves is similar to its competitor, NZG Models, though perhaps NZG's are slightly more adventurous in models contracted and slightly more realistic – but this is simply a perception. While NZG Modelle focuses more on construction and earth moving equipment, Conrad's line-up centers more on a variety of commercial trucks themselves. Several models, however, are quite distinct, like stationary construction cranes, tunnel borers, and jackhammer trucks.

Lately, some NZG Models have been marketed under the Conrad name, but normally the two companies remain fairly autonomous from one another, while competing for similar contracts. For example, Conrad had the Caterpillar line of construction vehicles through about 1990, but the licenses changed over to NZG sometime after.

Model details were generally finely crafted. For example, Conrad's Volvo 470 F16 Intercooler Globetrotter cab with refrigeration tanker had some priceless details such as an opening rear door on the tanker revealing cooling gauges and mechanisms. Intricately detailed cooling fins under the rear of the tanker were surprising considering one couldn't even see them unless the model was turned over.

Various websites show that prices for Conrad construction models vary greatly from about $55.00 (AU) for a Moffett forklift or $80.00 (AU) for basic Mercedes Sprinter ambulances to over $1,900.00 (AU) for some of the more complex Liebherr tower cranes.

== Diecast cars ==
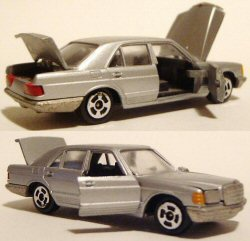
Conrad Mercedes Benz. Note here the simpler chrome wheels

During the 1980s in particular, and similar to NZG, Conrad introduced automobile promotionals mainly in 1:43 scale. Fit and finish of the auto models was very good and comparable to other German manufacturers, Schuco Modell, Schabak, Gama Toys, or NZG. Conrad focused on Volkswagen (Polo (Mk2, hatchback and coupé), Passat (B2, 5-door hatchback and wagon), Santana, Scirocco (second generation) and Type 2 (T3)) and Audi (Coupé (B2), 100 (C3 sedan) and the Quattro). By contrast, NZG did more Mercedes-Benz and Porsche models while Cursor focused on Mercedes and BMW. Conrad did, however, do some Mercedes-Benz replicas like the 280TE wagon and 190E sedan. Also similar to NZG, Mercedes-Benzes were cast in a larger 1:35 scale, indicating the marketing preferences of the client. Also NZG made Porsche promotionals, while Conrad did not, but, like NZG Conrad has not produced automobile models since the 1980s so as to focus more on models of trucks and construction equipment.

Observation of the selection and timing of promotional products of Conrad and NZG reveals a sophisticated relationship between model companies and real vehicle manufacturers – relationships rarely seen among toy manufacturers in England or Italy. In Germany, the contract of the model manufacturers, the choice of models and their appearance and packaging, appear to be more decided by the specifications of the specific German auto producing client, not the demands of the toy industry or the collector. This kind of relationship, however, was somewhat more common in France where even Citroen (for a time) made its own promotional models. This marketing relationship also emphasizes the probability that, to avoid confusion, there was more interaction between the different German firms making the models.

== Promotional packaging ==
Conrad model cars were packaged in boxes virtually identical to those of other German manufacturers like NZG and Cursor. Boxes were normally silver and standardized (down to vehicle likenesses on the flaps and the big blue serif lettering on the box sides). This is another indication demonstrating that, here, the requirements of the client drove the appearance and marketing of the promotional product. The model companies are closely knit to the real companies' requirements – something not quite as common with American promotional makers and the 'Big 3' auto companies.

The uniform packaging situation among different model manufacturers, then, causes brand confusion. Which models are made by Conrad and which by NZG or Cursor? It is not always clear on the box – one could assume Mercedes-Benz itself might have made them. This is similar in a way to how Corgi Toys, Dinky Toys or Lonestar Toys were packaged similarly in the 1960s. But, by contrast, Corgi and Dinky were not making promos for competing companies, they were competing against each other.
