= Schuco Modell =

German toy manufacturing company

Schuco

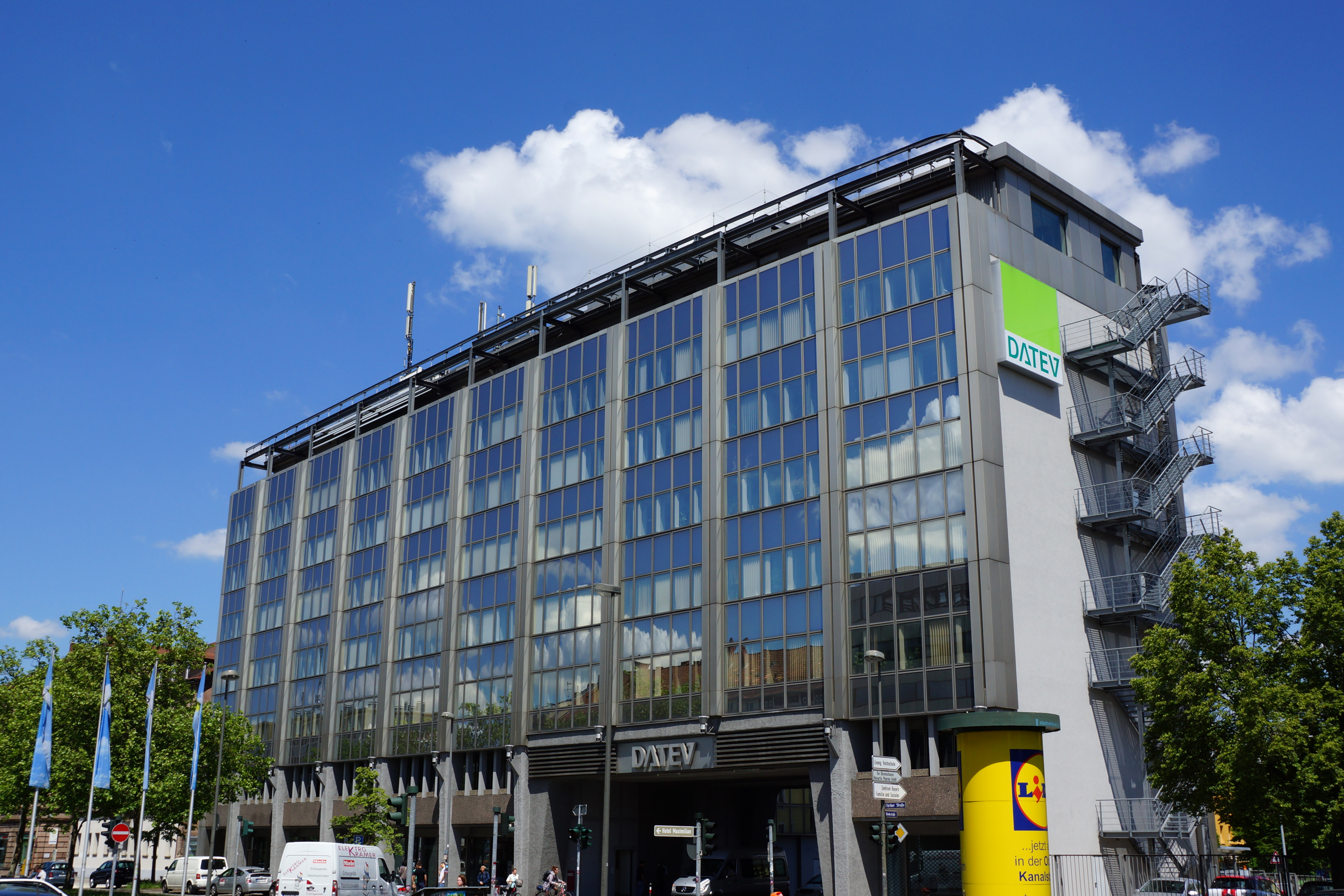
- Former building of Schuco in Nuremberg
- Formerly: Schreyer & Co. (1912–21)
- Type: Private (1912–76, 1996–99); Subsidiary (1999–present)
- Founded: 1912
- Founder: Heinrich Müller; Heinrich Schreyer
- Defunct: 1999; 27 years ago
- Fate: Declared bankruptcy in 1976, then reformed in 1996, became a brand after its acquisition
- Headquarters: Fürth, Germany
- Products: Tin toys, die-cast scale model cars, aircraft, commercial vehicles
- Owner: Simba Dickie Group (1999–present)
- Subsidiaries: Solido
- Website: schuco.de

Schuco is a German brand and former manufacturing company founded in 1912 by Heinrich Müller and the businessman Heinrich Schreyer in Nuremberg, popularly known as Germany's toy capital. The company's specialty was making toy reproductions of cars and trucks in tin, plastic and die-cast. The company went bankrupt in 1976 but was reorganized in 1993 and then totally independent again by 1996 before its acquisition by the Simba Dickie Group in 1999.

Some of the products currently commercialised by Schuco include die-cast scale model cars, aircraft, ships, and commercial vehicles.

== History ==
Originally named Spielzeugfirma Schreyer & Co, the company changed its name to the more succinct Schuco in 1921 (likely a derivation of Schreyer und Company. At its beginnings, the company made unique clockwork tin toys. Some of these were clever in that, instead of using a key, one would wind an arm or another feature.

In the 1920s Schuco introduced its famous Pick-Pick bird (over 20 million were made up until the 1960s). A wind-up mouse, a dancing mouse and trotting dog wearing a cape were other popular offerings. Before World War II there were also a number of 'gnome'-like wind-up figures and soldiers sometimes called blacksmiths – finished in creative colorful attire.

== Pre-War vehicles ==
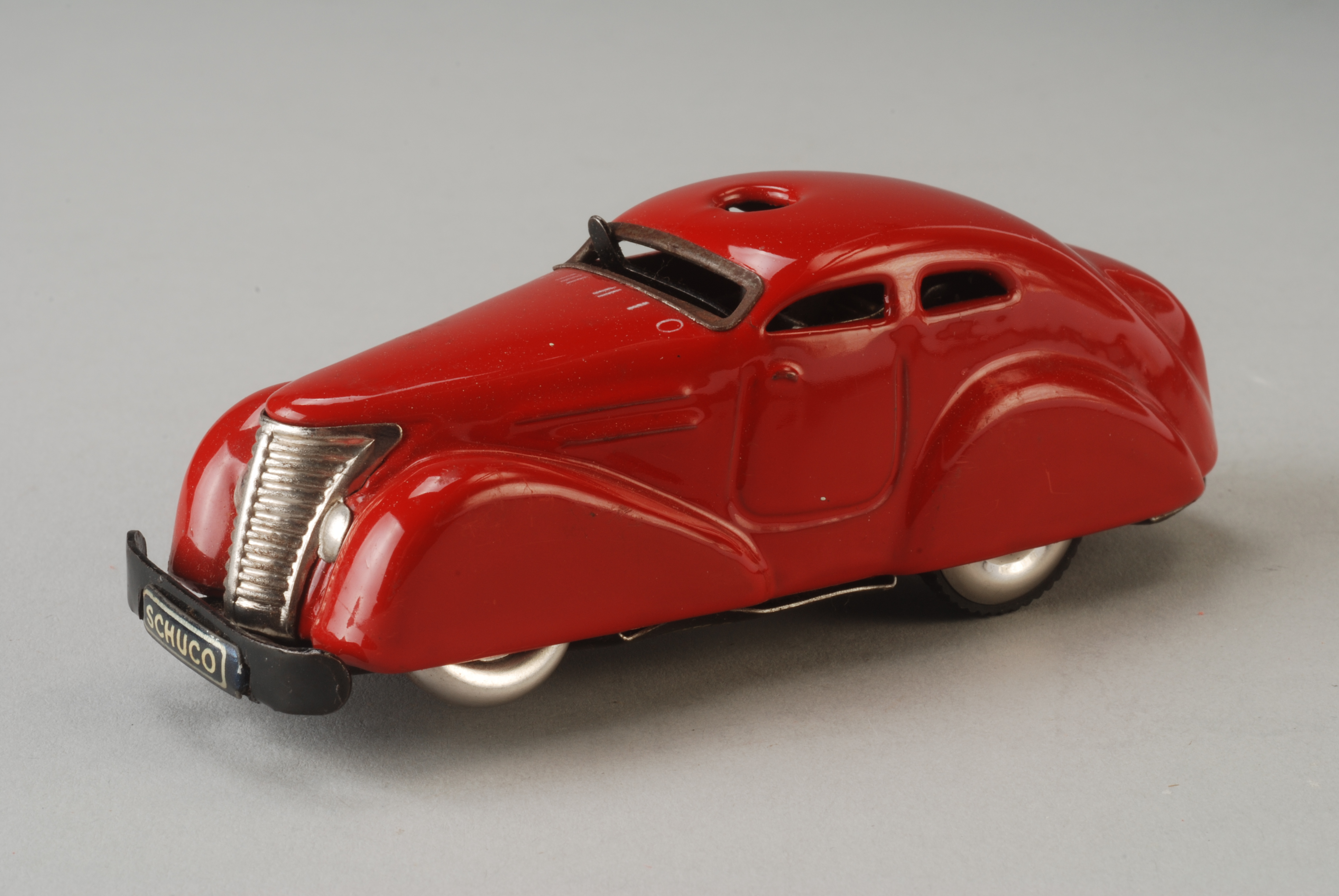
Schuco automobile c. 1936–42

In 1935 one of the first Schuco patent motor cars was produced, starting a legacy of producing toy motor vehicles that have usually been the company's main offering. Schuco toy lines always had some special quality or gimmick to attract collectors as well as children. Around 1938, production was begun on tin cars that were made either with clockwork motors or 'telesteering' where the toy could be steered through a small steering wheel attached to the car with a wire.

Schuco 'Studio' cars had a starting crank, removable wheels, varied gearing and rack and pinion steering. Cars came with miniature tool kits. Probably because the Schuco name ended in "o", this started a tradition of naming vehicle lines and sets with a somewhat male, Italian-sounding "o" at the end. Thus, Studio, Piccolo, and Varianto. One notable Studio car was the Luigi Fagioli Auto Union Avus 'Streamline', built in 1937, which came in a detailed box, complete with tools. Only 1,000 were produced. Schuco 'Turn Back' cars had a metal pin sensor that made the car turn when approaching the edge of a table. Wooden pegs were actually provided with the toy so the car could be driven around them.

The Schuco 'Command 2000' car was voice activated, by speaking loudly or blowing through louvres in the roof, it would start or stop on command.

== Post-War directions ==
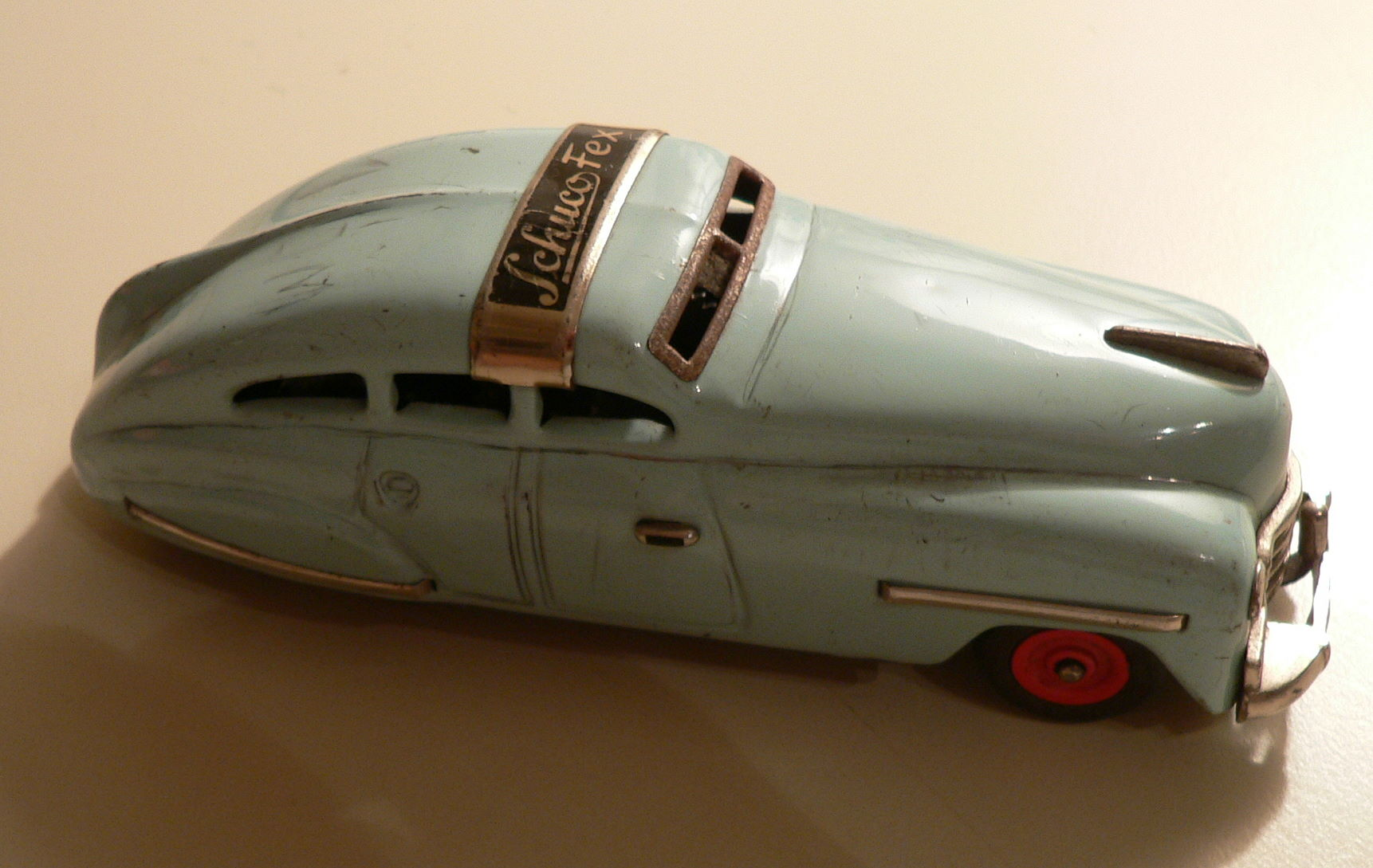
Automobile (FEX) c. 1947

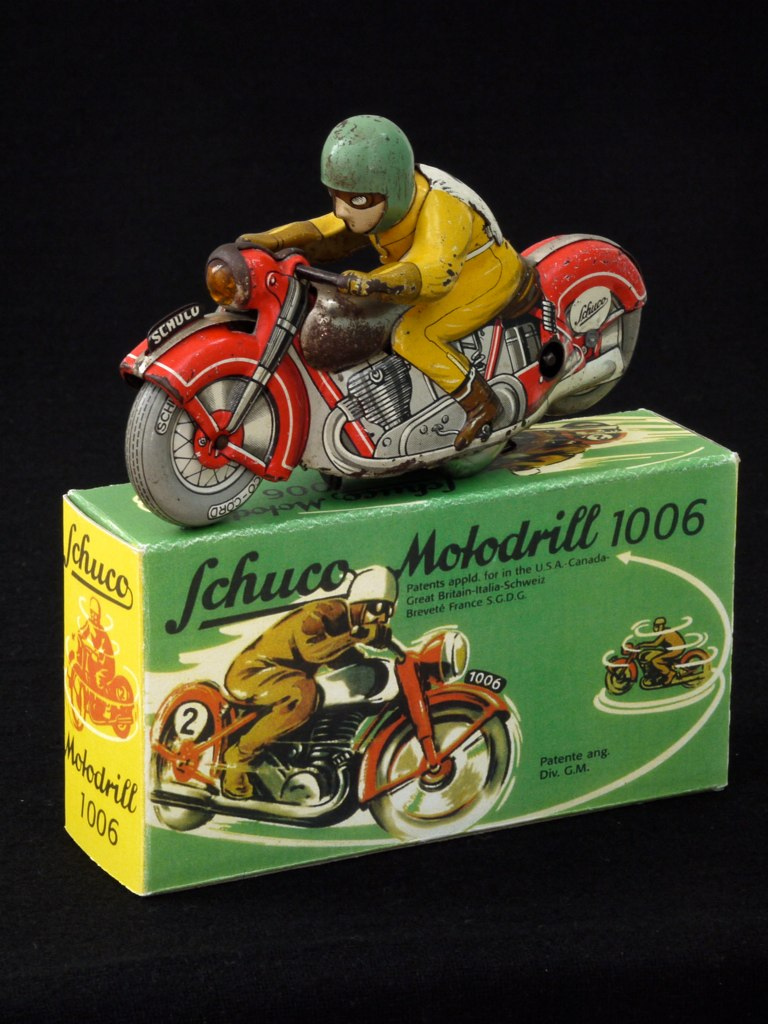
Motodrill motorcycle c. 1950

Toy production was halted during the devastation of World War II. In the late 1940s, Schuco again began tin toy assembly – this time focusing a bit more on the broader European and international market. Tin toys were larger scale – in the neighborhood of 1:24 to 1:18. During the 1950s there was a shift to plastic (especially for larger scales) and diecast metal, introduced in the Piccolo series in 1958, became commonplace for models in the early 1970s. Model types were varied and continued to include remote control and wind-up toys. Toy scales were always widely varied starting with HO (1:87) up to a foot long or larger (about 1:12).

Post-war cars during the 1950s mimicked real cars but were most often generic – some Schucos looked like Kaiser-Frazers, BMW 328s, Buick sedans, or Porsches, but these names were never used for the toys until the Mercedes Elektro Phanomenal was introduced in 1955. By the mid-1960s, most cars were given specific brand names of actual automobiles.

== Varianto ==
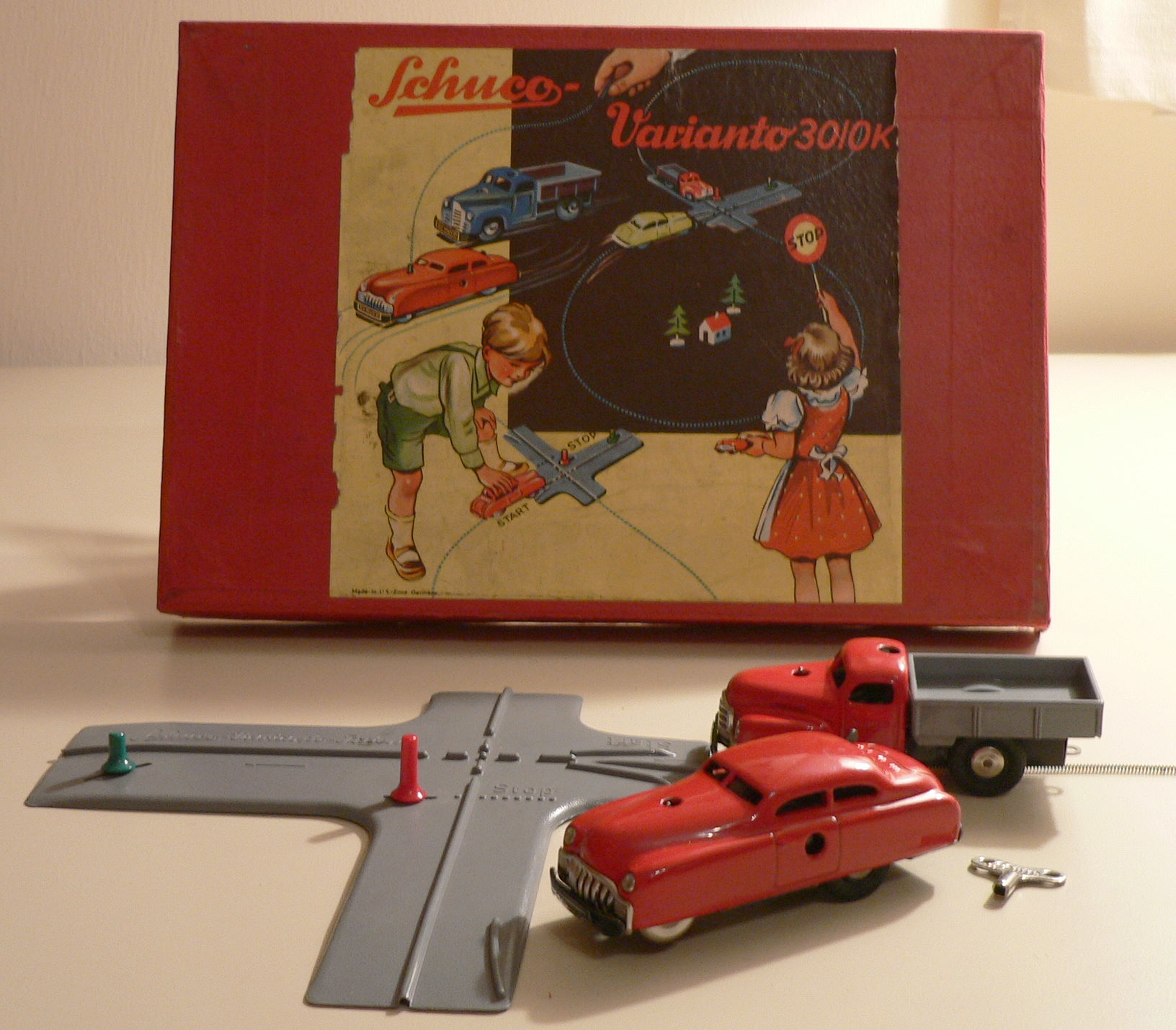
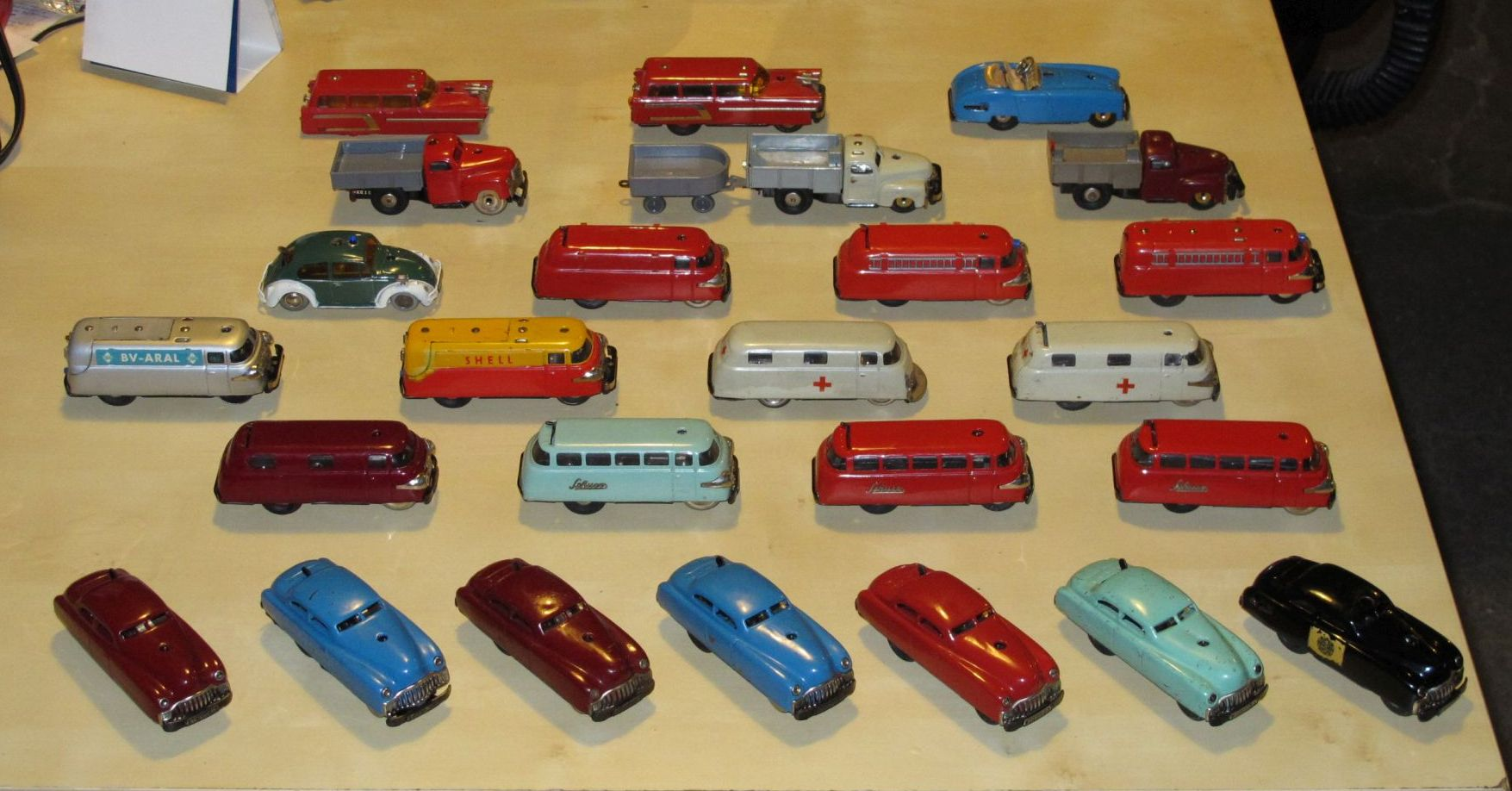
(Left): A Schuco Varianto gift pack with track; (middle): Various examples of the Schuco Varianto lineup. Notice the very rare 3048 Patrol car in the lower right corner; (right):Schuco Varianto-Lasto 3042

The Schuco Varianto wire-track system was introduced in 1951. The company's advertisements stated, "The automatic traffic game featuring a new kind of wire track never seen before." The clockwork or battery-operated cars had a guide wheel on the underside that set within coiled wire tracks. The tracks could be arranged in various configurations of the owner's own design. Different plastic pieces could be linked with the wire track to create intersections and overpasses. The Varianto system was sold for fifteen years and was immensely popular as a much cheaper alternative to electric train sets, having similar features and limited in layout only by the owner's imagination.

== Piccolos ==
Edward Force wrote that Schuco's first consistent foray into diecast toys was in 1958 when the 1:90 scale 'Piccolo' series was introduced. These solid metal (and heavy) cars were accurate, yet mildly cartoonish at the same time. Piccolos were solid cast metal without plastic windows nor did they have interiors. Piccolos are highly collectible today, whether the original models or the later Schuco reproductions. More than 100 different Piccolos have been produced, some in many liveries, like the VW transporter van.

== Micro Racers and Old Timers ==
With a windup key, the 1:45 scale Micro Racer cars would zip around, yet could also be pushed forward or backward without harming the wind-up mechanism. The "micro" name came from the "micro" – threaded steering which could be precisely adjusted. 'Old Timers' had specialized clock-work motors. When wound up and in neutral, the cars would shake and vibrate. Shift the car into gear and off they roll – the direction chosen by how the steering wheel was turned. Examples of cars in this series were a Ford Model T, a Mercedes Simplex, or a Mercer 35J. In addition, remote, drive-by-wire "telesteering" was seen on earlier, larger scale cars.

== Larger Scales ==
In the 1970s, cars around the world began to get larger. The 1:12 scale BMW 3.0 CSL Coupe in racing colors had switches to turn on and off head, tail and hazard lamps. A lever on the steering column operated the turn signals. The instrument panel was illuminated. The model had working steering. A 1:16 scale Porsche 911 was cleverly equipped with an electric horn that sounded with two tones and a set of studded rally tires that could be placed on the vehicle after raising it with a functioning jack. The car, similar to the BMW, ran with an electric motor forward and reverse and also had working steering. Schuco's 1:16 scale Formula 2 Brabham Ford BT33 and Formula 2 Ferrari were made in the early 1970s and detailed with many pressed metal pieces including wheels and tires. They had electric motors for both forward power and steering.

== Traditional diecast ==
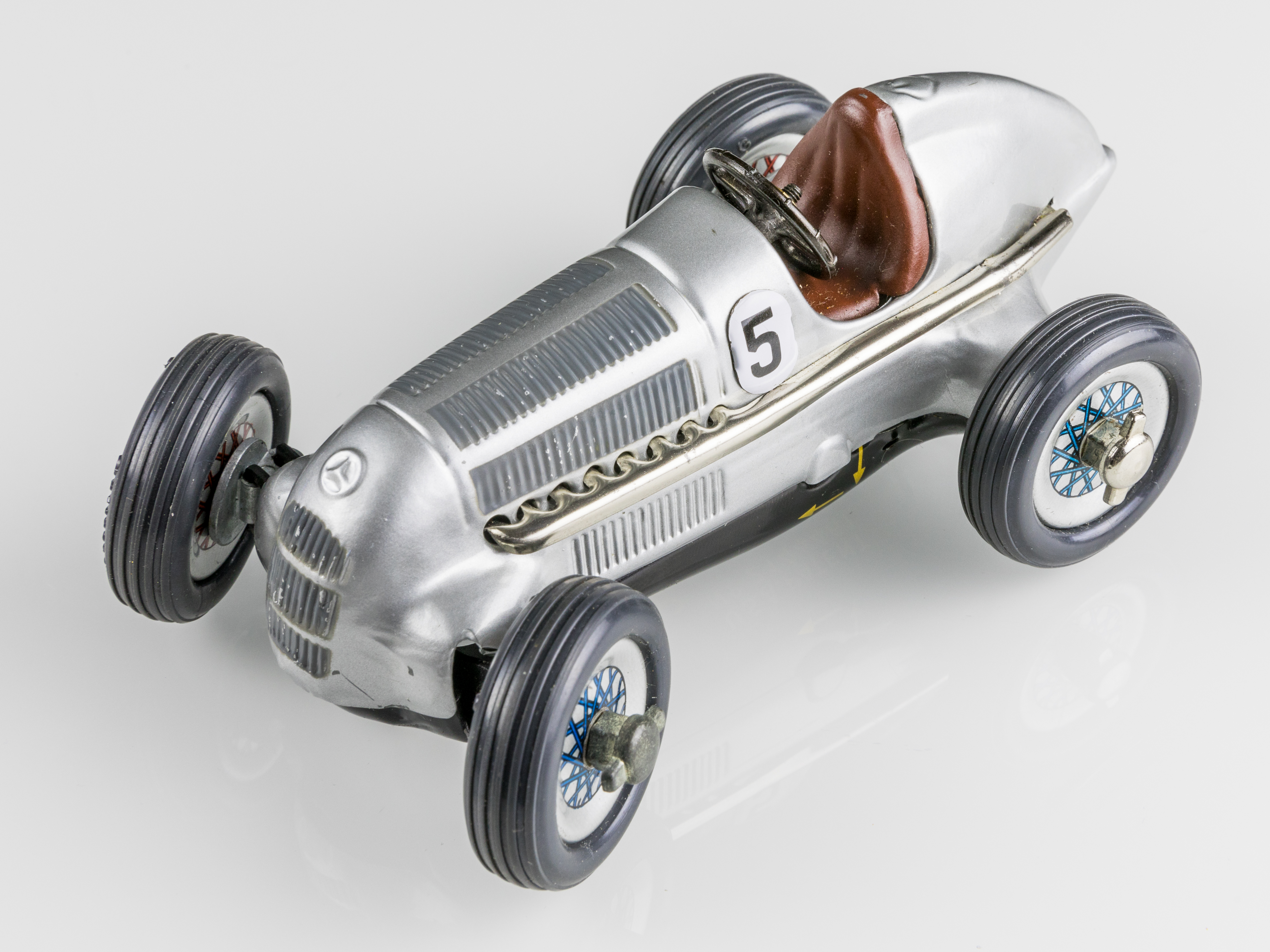
Schuco Studio 1050, Mercedes Grand Prix 1936

Models in 1:43 scale (the 1000 series) were introduced in 1960. In 1971 and 1972, a new 1:43 scale was introduced (the 600 line) and the first 1:66 Matchbox-sized 300 series appeared. The smaller cars were called "Super Schnell" (Super Fast), which after translation from German seems essentially identical to the wording used by Matchbox. As seen, other diecast and remote control vehicles were sometimes much larger.

Schuco's diecast 1:43 scale line in the 1970s was extremely precise in detail with near perfect proportion to the real cars. Usually all features opened. Paint application seemed more refined and not as thick as with British Corgis and Dinkys. As might be expected, most models were German makes: Volkswagen, Porsche, Audi, Mercedes-Benz, and BMW.

Accurate replication was as good as Solido and the earlier Politoys M series, and better than most Gamas or Conrads. Precision was perhaps on par with later NZG Mercedes and Porsche promotionals. Also, similar to Solido, Schuco avoided the attractive but less realistic jewels for head and tail lights. Alas, when the company comes up with near-perfect models – financial troubles arrive.

== Schuco lines ==
Some of the popular Schuco toy lines (often ending in -o) have been: Command Car, Magico Series, Radio Series, Patent Series, Piccolo Series, Fex 1111, Mirako Series, Telesteering cars, Examinco Series, Akustico Series, Ingenico Series, Elektro Phanomenal, Dally cars, Grand Prix Racers, Studio series, Varianto System, Old Timers, Micro Racers, Motorcycle range, Elektro Radiant Airplanes.

== Financial woes and casting seconds ==
Schuco went bankrupt in 1976. An English company Dunbee-Combex-Marx (DCM) acquired Schuco (or large parts of it), but it too went bankrupt in 1980. Eventually, rival German toymaker Gama Toys, acquired the rights to Schuco in the mid 1980s, and, for a time, new Gama Toys were 1:43 scale Schucos put directly into Gama boxes – with no name change on the base of the vehicle. Whether these were newly cast cars with no change in lettering, or leftover stock is uncertain. In the U.S. during the 1980s, Schuco toys were marketed by the Lilliput Motor Company of Yerington, Nevada, with the Lilliput name appearing prominently on the colorful Schuco-style boxes.

Edward Force writes that about the time of the Gama purchase, Schuco dies were sold off to many other companies in different countries. Some even appeared with "Made in Russia" on their bases. The MIR Toy factory in Mir, Bulgaria (later to become Mikro'67), reproduced at least 16 different Schuco vehicles through the 1990s, in several colors. Sometimes they were packaged with "Made in Germany" still marked on their bases – but after a time this labeling was removed. Some Schuco model castings then appeared as Gamas; some went to France and became Norevs, and some went to Brazil and were sold by Rei.

== Revival ==
In 1993 Gama-Schuco combined with Trix, a maker of small ('N') scale trains, and a company previously associated with Märklin. In 1996, Schuco became independent again and saw a revival, producing a wide variety of collectible models, with many newly designed castings, but many being exact replicas of earlier lines.

In 1999, Schuco was acquired by the Simba Dickie Group and model boxes were labeled with stickers saying "Dickie Schuco" even if it was old inventory. Simba Dickie had previously absorbed Smoby which had previously purchased French Majorette which in turn had acquired Solido. Majorette and Solido were apparently spun off, but by 2009, Schuco was healthy enough to acquire Schabak.

Today Schuco makes a variety of models (mainly street vehicles) in different scales. There are classic and newer lines, all accurately detailed. For example, the classic BMW 2000 sedan has a multi-colored interior, very tiny logo decals on the centers of the wheels, and more realistic clear plastic lights. One author wrote that the Schuco 2000's appearance was crisp because there were no opening features – which often causes the mismatching of body panels. The company also became involved, in the early 2000s, in the production of promotional models for GM (Opel and Vauxhall) in 1:43 scale. These were done in authentic GM colors and interior styles with authentic dark flat gray window trim. Changes in the parent company caused the name to change to Dickie Spielzeug GmbH. Under Dickie, the quality of the models is superior to the average toy model vehicles, therefore unit prices are higher as well.

In 2023, Schuco became a part of Minimax Import & Export Co. Ltd., a French model car manufacturer which has famous brands such as Spark and Bizarre, which stake had been acquired by Simba Dickie in 2021. As a result, the 'Schuco' brand was integrated into the joint model car group.
