= Schabak Modell =

German toy company

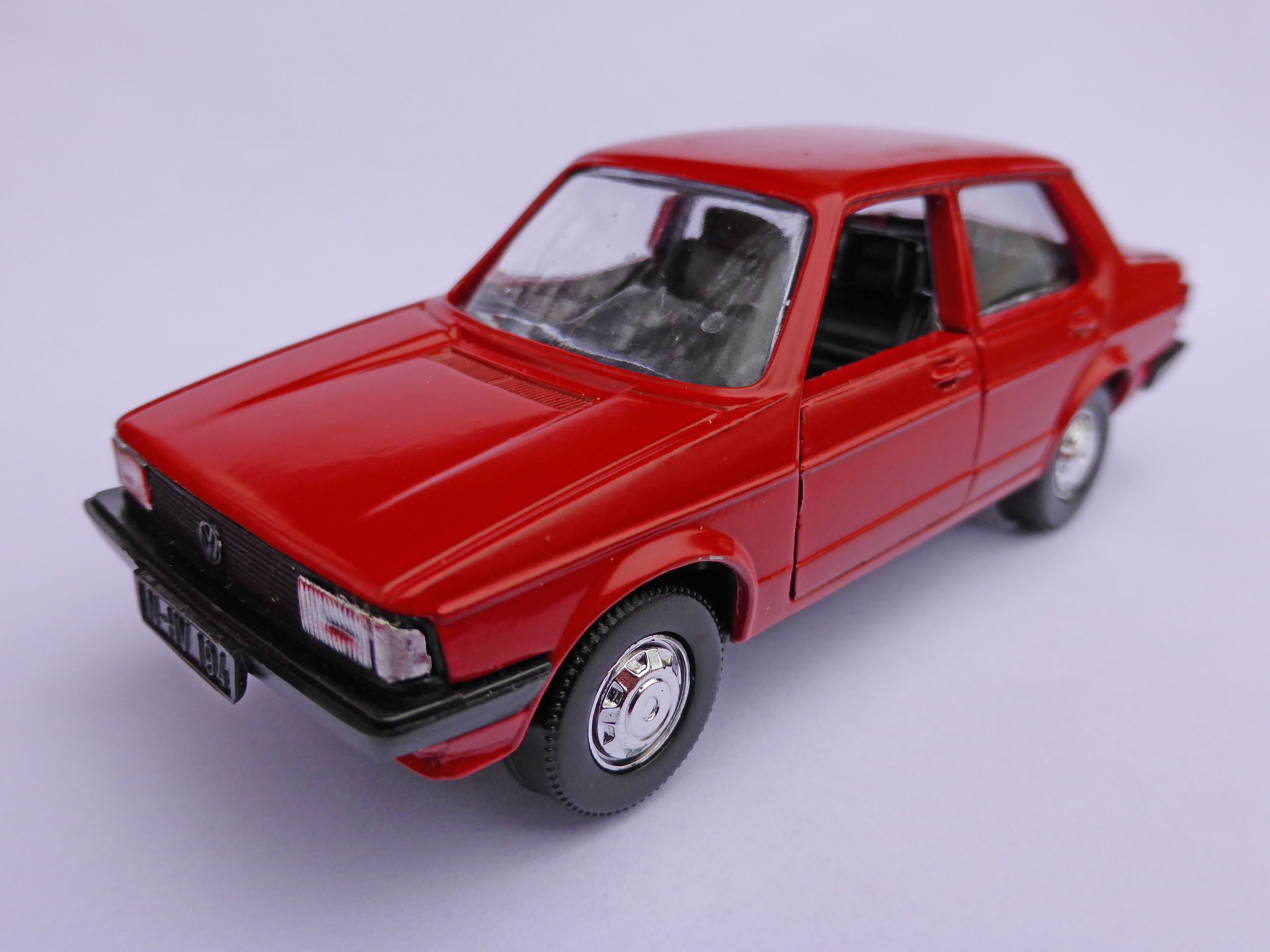
The first Schabak model: VW Jetta in 1:43 scale.

Schabak is a die-cast toy producer based in Nuremberg, Germany. The company is well known for its line of German cars and commercial airline models. The company had an on and off relation with Schuco Modell.

== German origins ==
Schabak was formed in 1966 by Max Haselmann, Gerhard Hertlein, Horst Widmann and Wolfgang Stolpe. The company began as a toy distributor, mainly for Schuco Modell toys – and not as a producer. When Schuco went out of business in the late 1970s, Schabak acquired most of Schuco's tooling (cars and airplanes) and made agreements with many airlines to continue producing model aircraft.

The company reissued many of Schuco's own diecast airplanes. Schabak then carried on the Schuco tradition of producing toy and model cars.

In the early 1980s, Schabak largely replaced Schuco, but Gama Toys acquired dies from Schuco and reproduced many of Schuco's 1:43 scale line as well.

== Model lineup ==
Schabak models were a range of exclusively German vehicles first in 1:43 scale. A Volkswagen Jetta was the company's first car, and Volkswagens, Audis, BMWs, and German made Fords were the company's common offerings. Many cars were offered as promotional models in manufacturer approved packaging with official logos.

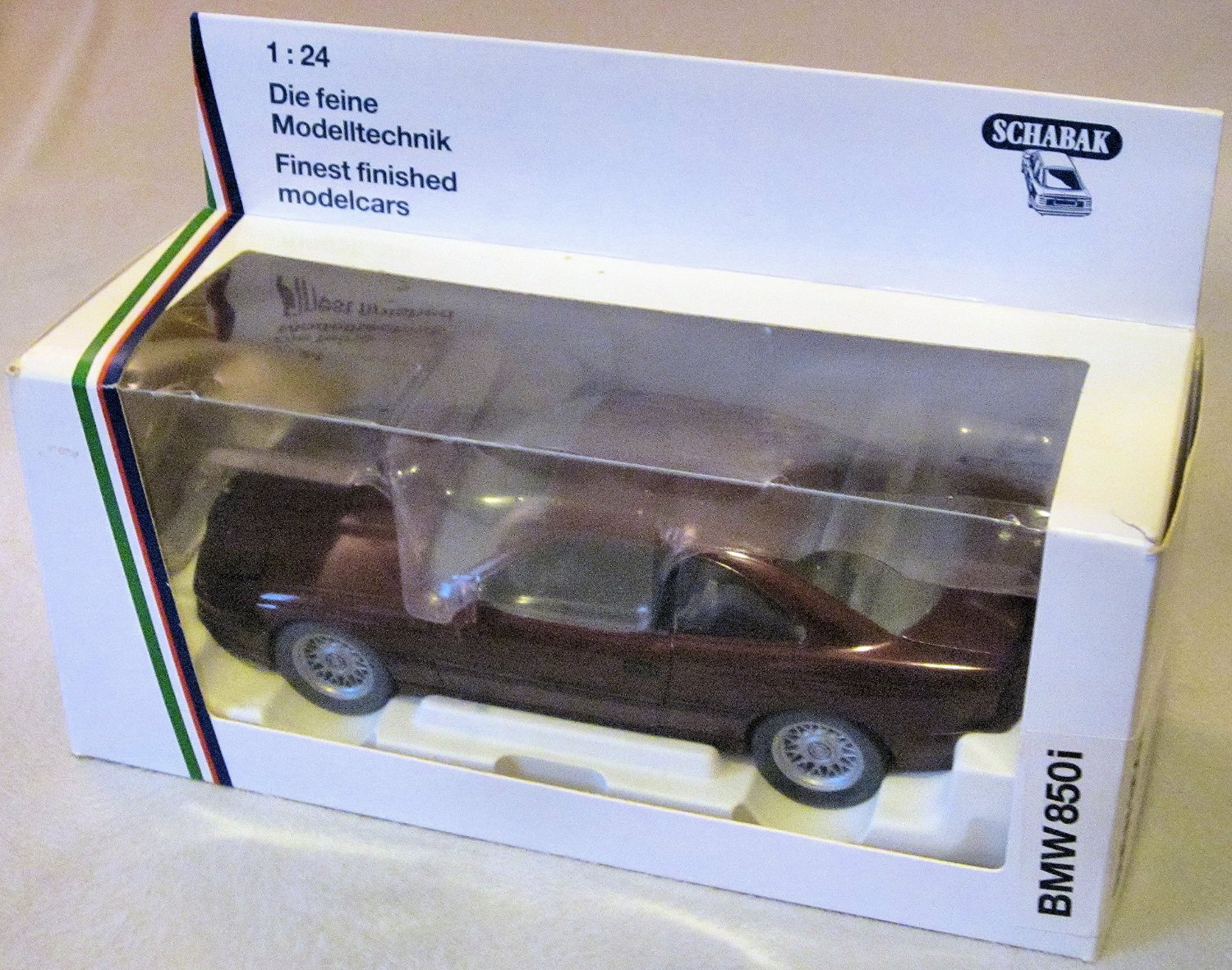
Schabak BMW 850i in 1:24 scale.

Later diecast cars were offered in 1:24 scale – so Schabak was one of the earlier model manufacturers to move up to the larger sizes, in the mid-1980s. Vehicles offered in the larger scale were: Ford Sierra Cosworth (the Sierra also offered in police livery), Granada, Orion, and Fiesta XR2i; Audi 80 Quattro, BMW 750, BMW 850, and Z1; Mercedes S Class, and VW Golf VR6.

Over time, Schabak has carved a respectable name for itself in the die-cast car market, although it is not well known outside of Europe. Outside Germany, competitors Matchbox, Hot Wheels, Maisto, and Corgi were more popular.

Similar to Schuco which preceded it, Gama Toys, and NZG, Schabak car models have excellent detail and proportion usually with all apertures opening. Fit and finish of Schabak vehicles often seemed superior to the other German toy brands.

Also similar to other German 1:43 scale products, headlights are usually done in chrome rather than jeweled. Tail lights were most commonly red plastic lenses. Model bases are diecast as similar to Schuco, but often in a darker 'gun-metal' color. Unlike Schuco, Schabak Models usually did not have basic specifications of the real cars on their bases. Often models came in two different kinds of packaging – window boxes for the retail toy market (see photo here) or a smaller container with a photo of the car, but sans plastic window.

Similar to the trend set by Mattel's Hot Wheels, and as a cost saver, tires were hard plastic, though wheel designs were often unique to the particular model, a feature that Solido had pioneered in the 1970s. For example, Audi's four "Auto Union" rings appear on Schabak wheels.

== Aircraft ==
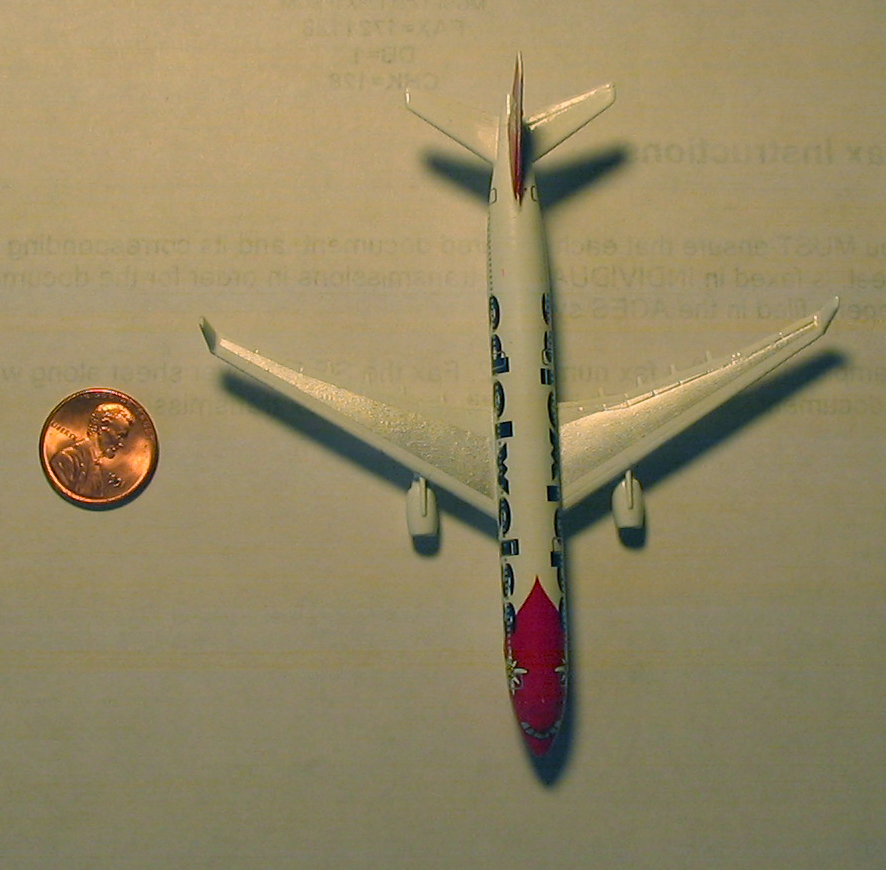
Edelweiss Airlines Schabak model plane, with a United States penny for comparison

Schabak, perhaps more than anything. was known for its diecast airplanes, mostly commercial airliner models in 1:600 scale. As mentioned earlier, Schabak's first planes were taken directly from Schuco.

Schabak had well over 200 airlines as customers, Schabak was, for a long period during the 1990s, the only company known to have a contract to produce models of Iraqi Airways, having produced a Boeing 747 of that airline in the 1:250 scale.

== Sale to Schuco ==
Schabak was purchased by Schuco in January 2006. Schuco had been a part of the Simba Dickie group, since 1999. Ironically enough, Schuco now once again possessed Schabak's aircraft line – which Schuco itself had originally started and surrendered to Schabak.

With a revived Schuco, a situation occurred similar to Mattel's acquisition of Matchbox, Solido being acquired by Majorette (which was also purchased by, Simba-Dickie, but previously these were together for some time), or Daron's acquisition of Realtoy International. This issue is two respected lines brought together within one company that must be distinguished to avoid profit loss resulting from internal competition.

Schabak's car line, as a part of Schuco, for a while focused on German vehicles, while Schuco's lines focused on more toy-like scales (like the Piccolos), wind up cars, and autos from other countries. During the 1990s and beyond, for example, Schabak has added Porsches and Mercedes-Benzes to its mix, but by 2010, perusal of the Schuco website shows that Schabak car lines have been eliminated, leaving the Schabak name focusing solely on airplanes.
