= Mikro'67 =

Bulgarian manufacturing company

- The Mikro'67 factory photographed in 2009
- Founded: 1967; 59 years ago
- Headquarters: Razgrad, Bulgaria
- Products: Basketball backboards, outdoor recreation goods, sie-cast scale model cars, trucks
- Website: mikro67.com

Mikro'67 is a Bulgarian manufacturing company based in Razgrad, that produces and commercialises basketball backboards, outdoor recreation goods, toys, and scale model vehicles (mainly cars and trucks).

In 1990 there were 96 toy manufacturers in Bulgaria, including producers' co-operative societies and factories. Thirteen of them formed the State Economic Group "ДСО МЛАДОСТ" / "DSO Mladost"). Nowadays there is only one toy manufacturer left - "МИР"/"MIR" (from the communist era) to "МИКРО" / "MIKRO" a.k.a. "МИКРО'67" / "MIKRO'67" (post-communist era). Nowadays both the Mikro and Mikro'67 names are used interchangeably.

== The factory ==
In 1952 in one of the workshops of TPK (producers' co-operative society) Metalik differentiated team of workers for toys manufacturing. With a great effort and ambition the first toy was handmade - a wind-up chain tractor. The production list was growing - trucks, dumpers, diggers, a cannon, a car, a rocket and more. The volume of production and the number of the workers were growing; these were factors for the creation of a new independent factory.

On January 1, 1967, it was established and independent producers' co-operative society for toys manufacturing with chairman Petar Petrov. A question then arose - how was the new manufacturer to be named? With a number of opinions and suggestions, the most adequate of them was "Peace", because peace means joy and carefree childhood for children all over the world.

In 1971, the workers moved into a new building. Introduction of new technologies had then begun. Typical for that time were battery-operated toys - machine guns, telephones, SAU tanks and more. The range of toys produced widened.

On July 1, 1971, the name was changed from "TPK Mir" to "Mir factory" and became a part of DSO Mladost, a part of Committee for Youth and Sport and later a part from the Ministry of Light industry.

The adoption of new series of Tonka (USA) toys has begun. The production list grew up to 40 different toys. The unification of parts and products started. For the first time, the company expanded out of Bulgaria and began exporting products to Czechoslovakia, Poland, Cuba, Albania, and Jordan. Almost 80% of the production was exported.

On August 1, 1980 the name was changed from "Mir factory" to "Mir Youth factory." In 1983, topyl printing, assembling the toy boxes with PVX glue, moulding, and plastic parts metalling. The English company Matchbox's technology for the production of toys using the moulding method was licensed during this time. Five different casts were made and eight more in 1984.

In 1984 the toys from the MUKPO series were awarded with a gold medal at the International Fair in Plovdiv, Bulgaria. The toys from the HOBBY series were evaluated with the highest rank for "K" quality. In November 1986 a workers team for the manufacture of ski automates licensed from the West Germany company Marker was formed.

== Matchbox ==
After making a deal with the Matchbox company in 1983 the factory initiated the production of the first five Matchbox Superfast models and the first few Superking models. The pearl-colored paint on the models was not very durable, although this problem later improved. The wheels sets were imported. Today it is very hard to find mint condition models from that time—even in Bulgaria. Up until 1989, seventeen Superfast models and seven Superking models were introduced. Although all of the models had minor variations, they were essentially alike. Importantly, there was one primary condition for leasing the dies to the Bulgarian manufacturer - all the models produced were intended to be sold only to the Bulgarian market—with no exports permitted. Around 100,000-150,000 pieces of each casting were made. Additionally, after using the new dies, the factory was expected to return them.

In 1991, after the Cold War had ended, production began on the "second wave" of Superfast models. In the beginning there were again limited variations, but some of the early editions have the decals and the colors of the original models. After a few years, business relations soured between the Matchbox company and their Bulgarian partner. It seemed that after opening the borders, many of these Bulgarian models were sold abroad and some were very popular. The Matchbox company eventually broke the contract with Mikro, but they were unable to get back the dies for some models. The results of this split are that nowadays Mattel does not recognize Bulgarian models as authentic Matchbox and that there are thousands of new variations by color, stamps, and wheels.

At the end of the 1990s Mikro'67 began offering advertising graphics for their models. Customers who wanted to personalize cars with a name, brand, or a graphic could get a manufacturing deal for customized Bulgarian Matchbox models. There was a condition - the customer had to order 100 pieces or more, although the models were allowed to be different. This marketing tool was used by local companies to promote products targeting children and adolescents and other companies related to auto care and auto parts. International Matchbox and other diecast model clubs also got some limited edition models for their members during special events. The quality of the models has slowly degraded. This, the uniform production list for more than 15 years, and the higher prices and other issues are all factors for lower production numbers nowadays. From time to time, shortages of certain parts cause new wheel variations to appear - sometimes even non-Matchbox models receive Matchbox wheels and vice versa.

== Gama ==
In 1985, parallel with the Matchbox models, production began on the Gama models. For the first 1–2 years, they were all kit models for user-assembly and available in only one color—pearl grass green. Later, they started making factory-assembled models. Some Gama models are still in production.

== Schuco ==
In 1994, Mikro started making Gama/Schuco models for the German market. In the first few years of production, they were unavailable on the Bulgarian market, but a limited number of models that didn't meet the German criteria for quality slipped from the factory and got into the hands of local collectors. Mikro was making mainly Opel models, although there were few BMW models and Mercedes Vito, promotional models and construction and other vehicles. The models were made and boxed in cheap boxes, exported to Germany where they were then transferred into their original Schuco boxes. Unlike the Matchbox models, neither the Gama nor the Schuco models have a sign on the base plate reading "Made in Bulgaria." In fact, some of them even have the "Made in Germany" or "Made in W. Germany" insignia. Perhaps one of the reasons for this is that the country of manufacture could affect sales because some collectors consider the German or Chinese editions to have better quality.

== Other models ==
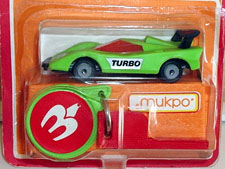
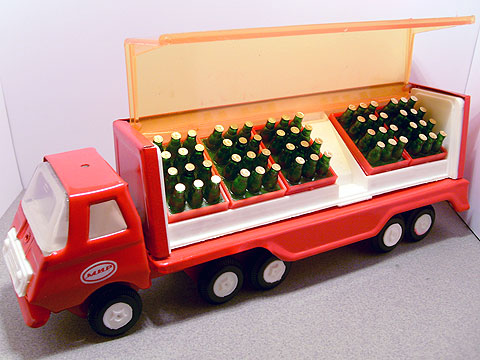
(Left): Kidco Burnin' wheels made in Bulgaria; (right): Tonka Coca-Cola Bulgarian truck and trailer

Mikro'67 made and still makes some pressed steel Buddy L, Clover and Tonka toys. Between 2004 and 2008, five NZG diecast models were made.

Only one diecast model was actually 100% designed and made in Bulgaria. A few models were based on Yaxon, Kidco, and Unimax models.

== Media ==
The Mikro'67 website is fairly updated and doesn't target the diecast models. Product/model catalogs never have been issued to customers or collectors, and there are only two known editions of brochures (of A4 size): one from the 1980s and one from 1991 intended for merchants or given to potential customers at toy and industrial fairs.
