= NZG Models =

German toy manufacturer

Nürnberger Zinkdruckguß-Modelle GmbH (NZG)
- Founded: 1968; 58 years ago
- Founder: Gerhard Schmid; Betty Hauer
- Headquarters: Germany
- Products: Diecast scale models cars, trucks, construction vehicles
- Website: nzg.de

Nürnberger Zinkdruckguß-Modelle GmbH (English: Nuremberg Diecast Models, mostly known for its initials NZG) is a German manufacturer of diecast scale models primarily in 1:50 scale for use both as toys and promotional models mainly by heavy transport and construction equipment manufacturers.

As seen in the name, the company is based in Nuremberg, Germany. Car models were also important as well as jet engine, aircraft, and stamping press models were also produced by NZG. A main company in competition with NZG, especially in production of construction vehicles in diecast for promotional purposes, is Conrad Models.

== History ==
According to the NZG website, Gerhard Schmid and Betty Hauer started NZG Modelle in 1968, when shop was set up in the second floor of a furniture company. The business soon moved to a 10,000 sq ft (930 m^{2}) site at Sigmundstraße industrial estate. The first model produced was a Weserhutte wheeled excavator, in that year. By 1974, at least 30 models were in the NZG range were noted in David Sinclair's Catalog. Sinclair, in the mid-1960s was one of the first importers to bring lesser known European brands to the U.S. Since then, over 700 different models have been produced and the company makes over 400,000 models a year.

In 1986 the company was operated by Inge Ludwig (née Schmid) and Hannelore Hauer. In 2000, NZG passed completely to the Ludwig family. Inge and Michael Ludwig run the company today.

Scales produced are 1:25, 1:50, and 1:87, as well as commercial vehicle models in 1:43. Special models require at least a 300 piece production order.

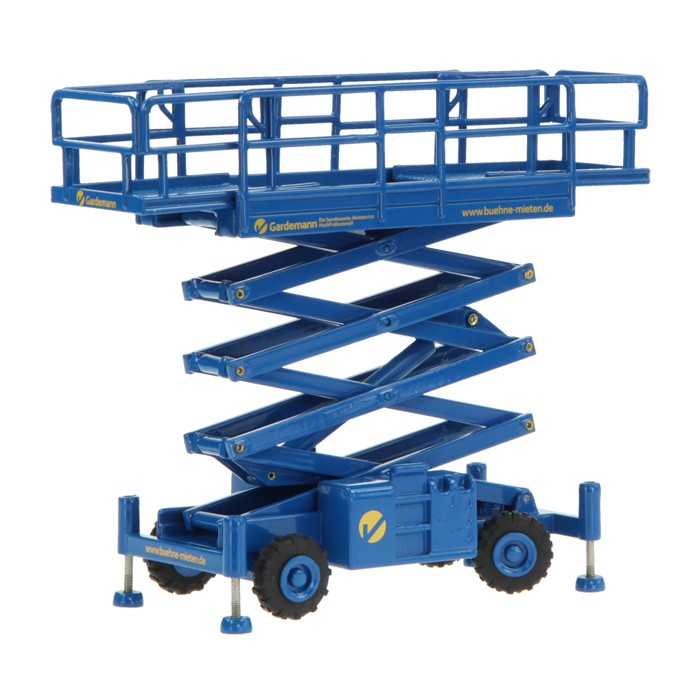
Haulotte scissors lift, an example of the breadth of industrial offerings by NZG.

== Not toys and not for children ==
NZG specializes in a wide variety of heavy equipment types ranging from hand pallet movers, forklifts, scissors lifts, reach stackers, power generators and skidsteers to front loaders, shovels, excavators, graders, and mammoth ore carrying dump trucks. Caterpillar and other engines and machinery are sometimes also made and displayed free-standing. Some offerings, like pavement profilers, road finishers, asphalt strippers, road rollers, pipelayers, large cranes and drill rigs have also been offered, and NZG seems to have the market corner in promoting many models for a variety of manufacturers. Considering the variety of commercial model vehicles and equipment, one sees that details are intricate and sometimes delicate. To call NZG models 'toys' is too simple - they are precise replicas of the real thing - and quite sophisticated.

Marques represented are from a broad range, and include MAN, New Holland, Volvo, Caterpillar, FAUN, Grove, Terex and Liebherr, to name just a handful. Chinese built bulldozers are reproduced. Larger NZG trucks, like the Terex and Liebherr ore carriers are quite expensive, sometimes costing as much as 500 U.S. dollars, but most models seem to sell for anywhere between US $50 and US $150.

=== Precision automobile promos ===
Diecast model car collectors have become accustomed to NZG's replicas of Porsches and Mercedes-Benzes which were often used as dealer promotional models. NZG Mercedes diecast promos were commonly seen in dealers and recognizable by their simple, but ubiquitous silver boxes with the blue markings. Design and concept for models and packaging were similar to Conrad Models which focused more on the Audi make, and also Cursor Modell which also produced Mercedes-Benz as well as BMW promotionals.

Most cars were in 1:43 scale, but some were larger, like the No. 82 Mercedes 420/500/560 SEC coupes which were 1:35 scale (almost 5½ inches long). Other Mercedes offered were the 380 SEC / 500 SEC and 280 SEL sedans. On the base was stamped "Made in the Federal Republic of Germany". Stern stickers were commonly found on the bases warning that the models were "not toys and not for children."

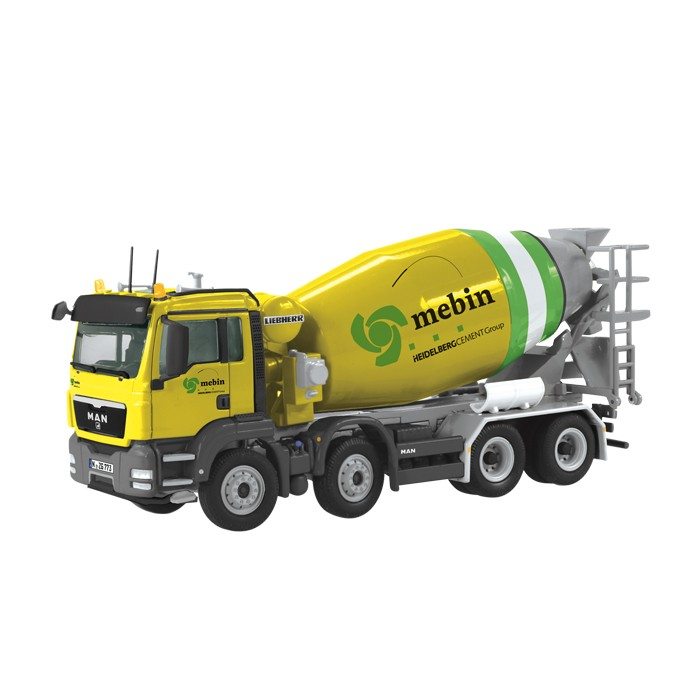
An NZG MAN cement mixing truck.

Most NZG cars were produced in the 1980s and 1990s. A variety of vans were also produced (FIAT, Peugeot, and Citroen) in the 1990s. No cars seem to have been produced past 2002, as the company continued to focus more on its trucks and construction vehicles. Many car models were manufactured, and remain widely available at reasonable prices.

Cars rivaled companies like fellow German Schuco Modell or the French Solido in detail and realism. All doors, hood, and trunk usually opened. Body proportions were spot on. Clear plastic lenses were used for headlights (no toy-like faceted jewels here) and tail light lenses were separately cast in red plastic. NZG also was adept at chrome plating small emblems and grille details that other diecast manufacturers would not attempt on models three times the size. Wheel designs were unique to each vehicle, for example, incorporating Mercedes or Porsche logos. Unlike Solido and Schuco, however, as well-done as they were, trucks and construction equipment were NZGs bread-and-butter, not cars.

== Marketing ==
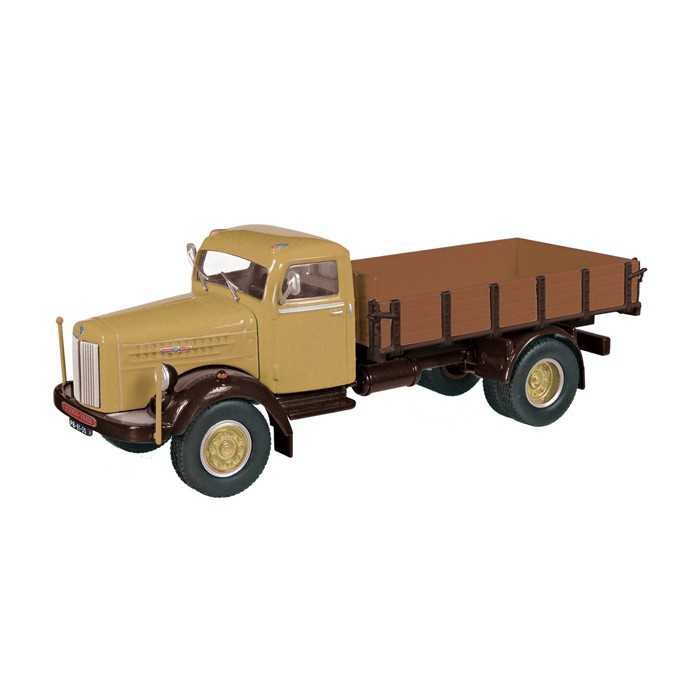
An older Scania L60 stake bed truck - not all offerings are of new vehicles.

There are similarities in marketing and relationships with other model companies in the 1980s like Gescha/Conrad Models and Cursor Models, who produced similar promotional models for truck and automobile companies. The collector gets used to seeing the same style silver and black boxes whether the model was produced by NZG or Cursor. Also, some NZG Models are also marketed under the Conrad name. About the late 1980s, some dies were also sold to the Bulgarian company, Mikro'67 and produced in the city of Mir.

== Other lines ==
NZG now consists of several lines of other model subsidiaries including TWH and Sword which are American Companies licensing NZG products. More autonomous are Premium ClassiXXs, producing classic German cars, vans and motorcycles in a variety of scales; Bubmobile and JNF Toys which reproduce classic 1950s windup toys in the Schuco Modell tradition and also HO scale vehicles. Lastly, is the Y-Serie of modern military trucks and equipment.

== See also ==
- Model construction vehicle
- Engineering vehicle
- Die-cast toy
- Scale model
- Mikro'67
