= Polistil =

Italian scale model vehicles brand

Polistil S.p.A.
- Founded: c. 1960
- Defunct: 1993; 33 years ago
- Fate: Company defunct, brand relaunched in 2014-2021
- Headquarters: Hong Kong, China
- Products: Die-cast and plastic scale model car racing car circuits
- Owner: May Cheong Group (2014–pres.)
- Website: maycheonggroup.com/polistil

Polistil S.p.A. (initially called Politoys) is an Italian toy brand and former manufacturing company headquartered in Milan, with production center in Chiari, near Brescia. Polistil specialized in die-cast and plastic scale model vehicles of all sizes.

There is a new site about the world of toys and his History of Polistil Factory: "Quelli della Polistil" on www.quellidellapolistil.it

The company also made toy and model tanks, dolls, robots and TV tie-ins. After a 33-year span, and a collaboration with Tonka, Polistil went out of business in 1993, but now is a brand under the May Cheong Group (owner of the brand Maisto), along with the name of former competitor Bburago. Traditionally, the principal Italian competitors to Polistil were Mercury, Mebetoys, and the shorter run Ediltoys.

== History ==
The origins of Politoys as a company are somewhat unclear. The company began as "Politoys APS" about 1960, and started production of 100 plastic cars in 1:41 scale. Some of these were contemporary cars and some were veteran vehicles – like an Alfa racing car from the late 'teens and an 1899 French Gobron Brillie. As the 1960s progressed, some models were produced in fiberglass – tougher than the plastic and less prone to warping. Following trends set by fellow Italian trailblazer Mercury, and Corgi Toys, Dinky Toys, Norev, and Solido, the company changed over to diecast metal vehicles in 1964 or 1965. About 1970, the company name was changed to Polistil, possibly because of the similarity with the name of the British Palitoy. Still, some early toy boxes had the names 'APS', 'Polistil'. 'Politoys', and 'Policar' all on the box simultaneously (as seen on the blue Penny series boxes and in that order).

The company's main research and design center was in Milan. Larger toys for children were produced here, including large trucks and dolls. Most vehicles were made at the Chiari, Brescia manufacturing center which focused on the production of diecast vehicles (Polistil 1975).

Whereas more collector driven lines such as Rio Models or Brumm made the same models sometimes for decades, David Sinclair says that Polistil was more likely to confront market trends more directly – changing model lines every two or three years. As seen below, Polistil kept track of its vehicle lines using sets of capital letters followed by numbers, and not the use of series of numbers only.

== M-Series ==
Most, but not all, of Polistil's lines were prefaced with letters: CE, RJ, S, MS, etc., but the company did not start with the beginning of the alphabet. With Politoys’ diecast 1:43 scale M-Series starting 1965, the company became popular among consumers in accurately diecast vehicles along with the French company Solido, Italian company Mebetoys and the German Schuco. Dinky and Corgi were strong competitors in the United States, and Politoys did not match their success, nor did they produce as wide a range of models as the two brands.

Politoys’ 1:43 scale diecast M-Series line was introduced in 1965. The company had previously focused on plastic. The M series were precisely detailed with a wide range of offerings. Sixteen vehicles were introduced in the first year, with numbers starting at 500. The cars had many moving parts (normally 2 doors, hood and trunk opened) and the engines and even undercarriage had good detail. Plastic seats almost always tilted forward, and on some models they were covered with a fuzzy material that imitated velour.

Though companies like Corgi claimed to have the first model with all opening features in their 1963 Chrysler Ghia L6.4, Politoys M was the first diecast line where (for a time) all apertures opened on every model ! This contrasted with Dinky and Corgi which tended towards the "toy" market with gimmicks and TV and movie vehicles. Politoys, however, went for consistent realism.

Another unique advertising angle of Politoys M was to emphasize how they could be taken apart. One ad in the American market by U.S. representative Lynn International showed the 518 1965 Rolls-Royce Silver Cloud III (Mulliner Park Ward "slant eye" version) in pieces and asked "How can a boy own a Rolls Royce..be a collector and a mechanic all at the same time! With Politoys M, that's how" Below, the ad continued, "Assembled just like the big ones – real solid – with 52 parts, most of which you take apart piece-by-piece with the twist of a screwdriver, then put back together again..." The ad then concluded, "That's Politoys. Collect them. Tinker with them. Play with them." (Politoys by Polistil no date).

== Models ==
By the late 1960s, the M-Series range had expanded to 37 models:

- 500 – Alfa Romeo Giulia Sprint GT
- 501 – Maserati 3500 GT Coupe
- 502 – Siata Coupe Fiat 1500
- 503 – Mercedes-Benz 230 SL
- 504 – Ferrari 250 GT Berlinetta
- 505 – Autobianchi Bianchina Panoramica
- 506 – Alfa Romeo Giulia SS
- 507 – Ford Cortina
- 508 – Innocenti Morris IM 3
- 509 – Lancia Flavia Zagato 1800
- 510 – Opel Kadett Coupe
- 511 – Fiat 600
- 512 – Fiat 500 Giardinetta
- 513 – Fiat 850
- 514 – Alfa Romeo 2600 Coupe GT
- 515 – ISO Rivolta Coupe GT
- 516 – Alfa Romeo Giulia Zagato
- 517 – Fiat 850 Coupe
- 518 – Rolls Royce Silver Cloud III "Slant Eye"
- 519 – Ford Taunus 20 M.T.S.
- 520 – Lancia Fulvia Coupe
- 521 – Opel Diplomat 8V
- 522 – Primula Bianchi
- 523 – Alfa Romeo Giulia T.I. Super
- 524 – Simca 1500
- 525 – Ferrari "LeMans" Pininfarina
- 526 –
- 527 – Porsche 912
- 528 – Fiat 1500 GT Ghia
- 529 – Alfa Romeo Giulia Canguro 600
- 530 – Alfa Romeo 2600 Zagato
- 531 – Alfa Romeo Giulia "Gazella"
- 532 – Alfa Romeo GS Zagato
- 533 – OSI 1200 Coupe
- 534 – Ford Lola GT
- 535 –
- 536 – Dino "Ferrari"
- 537 – Alfa Romeo 2600 Pantera
- 538 –
- 539 – Lamborghini 350 GT

Numbers 526 (Fiat 1100), 535 (Porsche 904), and 538 (Volkswagen 1600 TL) are not mentioned in this data from an original catalog sheet as they were introduced later. The M-Series obviously concentrated on Italian vehicles. For example, 76 percent of this catalog's models were Italian, 37 percent alone being Alfa Romeo. Unique models produced that were not found elsewhere were the Iso Rivolta seen above, a later Chevrolet Corvette Pininfarina Rondine Coupe, and the first Lamborghini – bugeye – 350 GT.

From the start, the M-Series had tremendous competition. During the 1960s, each diecast model company had a unique approach and a unique market. Dinky and Corgi generally had different market areas, but were more popular in the U.S. French Dinky and Solido were more popular in France. Tekno was a Danish mainstay as were Gama, Schuco, and Marklin in Germany. More importantly, the Italian market was full. Mercury had been a leader of the Italian diecast industry for a long time, but no sooner had Politoys brought out the M-series, they were joined by Mebetoys and Edil, the latter only briefly, but the competition with Mercury and Mebetoys – who often offered similar models – was a challenge. Furthermore, Mattel's Hot Wheels diminished the American market after 1967.

Similar to Corgi, Dinky, and Mebetoys, Politoys M used jewels for headlights, while French Solido chose more realistic clear plastic lenses. Still Politoys often had delicately rendered headlight bezel surrounds and other carefully done details. While competitor Solido's niche in the diecast market was offering unique wheel styles for each model, the M-Series’ generic wire wheels were not authentic to real vehicles, but were quite attractive, classy and typical to the look of the time. By 1968, the company had also experimented with plastic wheels on low-friction axles – similar to changes made by Dinky, Corgi, Lonestar and others in reaction to the success of Hot Wheels. These added to the play value but detracted from the realism. As the 1960s progressed, Politoys produced more sports and exotic cars and fewer mundane everyday cars. This was the same tactic used by Solido at the time, but Corgi, Dinky, and French Dinky continued to offer many common sedans.

== Variations in 1:43 scale ==
In 1968, the 500-series started including models labelled as "Export." These were slightly cruder than the M-series, with fewer opening features. By 1970, Politoys has "used up" the numbers from 500 to 599, including some metal versions of models previously produced in plastic.

Later 1:43 scale series were the E, EL and HE. Some of the early models in these series were still up to the Politoys M in detail like the well done Lamborghini Espada and Islero (which had folding headlights). Body details were good with features, such as the Alfa Romeo Alfasud with complete ski equipment on the roof. On later 1970's issues like this one, however, the models sported toy-like chrome plastic wheel designs, that received criticism for its looks. The EL-Series was considered better than the E in this regard. David Sinclair, an Erie, Pennsylvania, importer who was responsible for starting the car collecting hobby in the states noted that one interesting model in the EL line was an AMC Gremlin. It was unique enough to see any American cars in European diecast, much less an AMC model!

Starting in 1967, Politoys also offered its 1:66 scale Penny series to compete with smaller Matchbox and Majorette, probably aimed at the American market, but the new series never gained their popularity so most were sold within Italy. Mint boxed examples are thus difficult to find.

In the late 1970s a variety of previous Polistil castings were shipped to Mexico and sold as the McGregor brand. McGregor sold both plastic and diecast versions of Polistil toys and models were usually marked with both the Politoys and McGregor names. Some models also seem to have made their way to the U.S.S.R. to be molded there in plastic, like the Maserati Mistral.

== A pioneer in larger scale ==
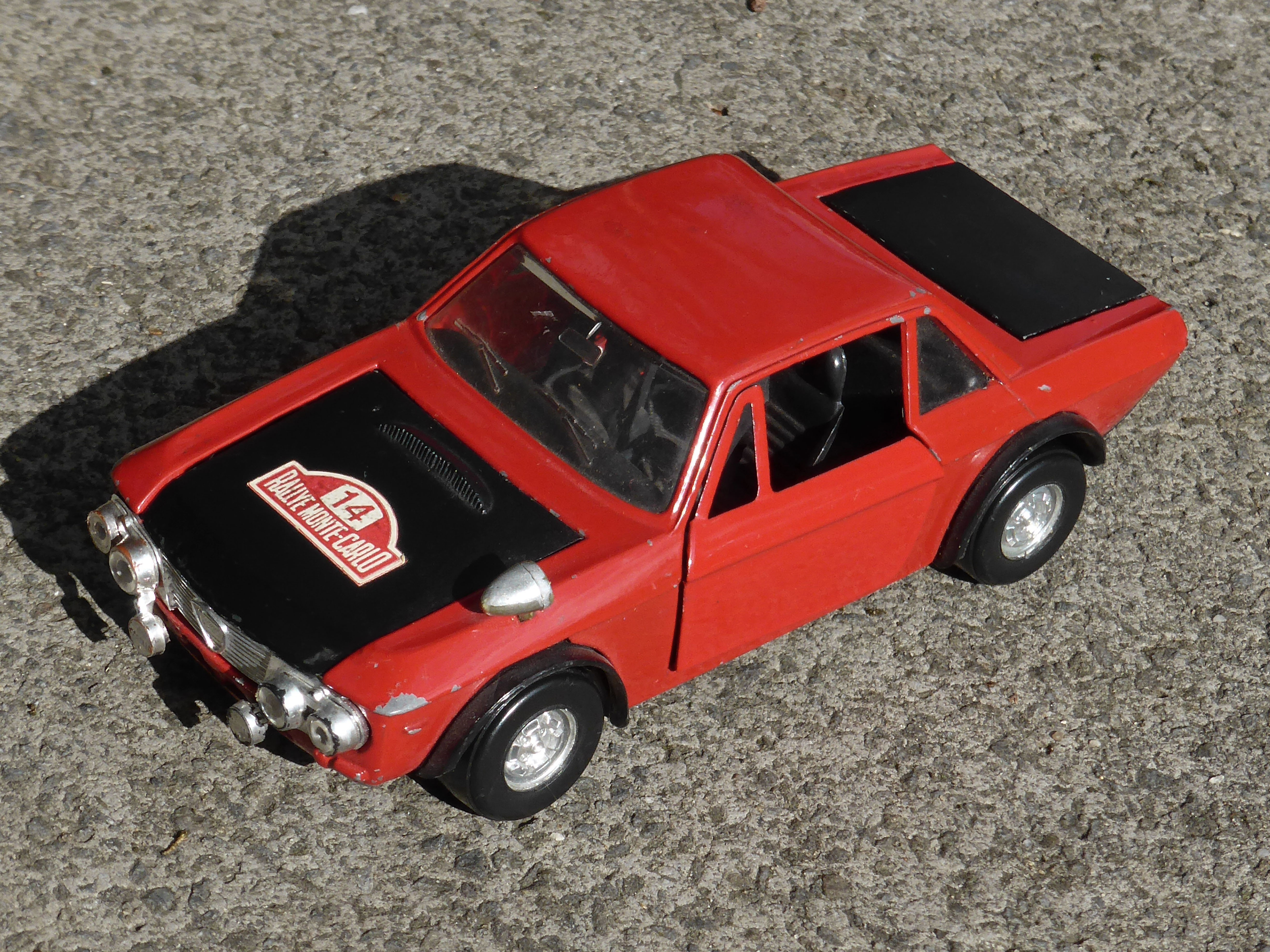
Lancia Fulvia 1600 HF from Polystil in 1:25 scale

By the early 1970s, Polistil diversified somewhat, offering slot cars and larger scales in metal. In 1973, the 1:24 scale S series (1:22 scale was used as well) competed directly with the new Martoys (later to become Bburago). Politoys was one of the first companies to move into this larger and more lucrative size, thus was a trend setter for larger diecasts that is still popular today. Though proportions on the larger scale Polistil vehicles was sometimes slightly off (so were some of the Martoys, and both Bburago and Maisto later improved), creative presentation made up for it. For example, rally vehicles such as the Lancia Fulvia polar expedition were stunning. This car featured white and brown paint speckled across the entire car – simulating snow and dirt.

The TG series of even larger 1:16 scale cars such as the Alfa Romeo 1750C, BMW 328 roadster, Lamborghini Countach, Ferrari GTO, Ferrari 250 California roadster and the Morgan Plus 8 were introduced about 1980. Some of these models, however, did not have the details of competitors Bburago or Maisto. The Morgan, for example is beautiful with opening doors, but the tires are hard plastic, not rubber; the steering wheel and front wheels are fixed; and the hood does not open, saving the cost of additional parts. The Alfa Romeo 1750, however, did come in two versions; top up and top down. By the late 1980s, though, the larger models were the backbone of Polistil sales, while it would last, and the 1:43 size was now being left to higher end collector brands like Eligor, Vitesse, and venerable Solido.

The MS and MT series of 1:15 scale Motorcycles also appeared about 1980. Racing series (see next heading) of all scales became a forte. A variety of trucks and tanks (the 'CA' series) and other military vehicles were offered. One very nice military offering was an Afrika Corps BMW motorcycle with sidecar in desert beige. TV and movie figures and vehicles also appeared but were not as popular as those offered by Corgi Toys or Dinky Toys, and are somewhat more rare today. Batman, Superman, and Disney vehicles were examples. In addition, Mego and Lion Rock military action figures were marketed under the Polistil name.

The J series were larger colorful toy-like trucks which used more plastic for bodies and larger plastic wheels. One example was the J85 Mercedes-Benz Unimog dump truck.

== A racing emphasis ==
One area where Polistil probably did better than any of the competition was in racing vehicles of various scales, mainly covering Formula 1, and at reasonable retail prices. The F and FK series were in 1:32 scale and first introduced in 1970 and ran until about 1980, changing wheel designs as the years passed. The 1:41 scale CE series appeared in 1978 and featured Renault, Ligier, Lotus, Brabham, Alfa Romeo and Williams, among others. Oddly, a few tractors also appeared in the CE series.

The RJ series (Penny Series) carried at least 45 Grand Prix and Formula 1 cars, while the TG and L series were 1:16 scale. Like many other teams, the fascinating Tyrrell P34 6-wheel F1 car appeared in two different scales.

At the end of the 1970s, Polistil started mass-producing electric racing car tracks. They were very popular in Europe.

== The end of Polistil ==
By the late 1980s, Polistil had released over 500 different vehicles of all sizes. In the late 1980s, the larger scales were marketed in the U.S. in a new relationship with Tonka. Apparently, Tonka had purchased Polistil. Vehicle boxes remained red at this time, but were now labeled Polistil/Tonka. This included larger 1:14 scale cars.

Competition with newer and upcoming Bburago, Maisto and mail order firms like Franklin Mint Precision Models provided a surge in competition in the larger scales and contributed to Polistil's demise. By 1993, just as the demand for 1:18 scale models was starting to peak, Tonka dropped the name, dropped Italian production, and venerable Polistil was gone.

== Chinese Polistil reappears ==
In 2014, the Polistil name was relaunched by the May Cheong Group, manufacturer of the Maisto brand. Now Polistil sells different products: slot car systems, radio controlled cars, die cast models of construction machinery, tractors, caricature cars, Formula One cars and so on. The Asian toy giant is responsible for resurrecting two well-known Italian brand names – Bburago and Polistil, but the products are now made in China, and no longer in Italy.

On the boxes now is printed "Manufactured by: Polistil International LTD, Hong Kong", or "Manufactured by: Most Success Trading LTD, Hong Kong". The new company was apparently created in Hong Kong on August 27, 2013.

== Bibliography ==
- Breithaupt, Doug. "Penny, Politoys or Polistil, Delightful Diecast Under Any Name". Archived from the original on 2012-04-19.
- Force, Edward (1992). Classic Miniature Vehicles Made in Italy. Schiffer Publications.
- Gardiner, Gordon; O'Neill, Richard (1996). The Collector's Guide to Toy Cars: An International Survey of Tinplate and Diecast Cars from 1900. London: Salamander Books Ltd. ISBN 0-517-15977-5.
- Stein, Jeffrey (5 June 2014). "Polistil Shipment News". Jeffrey Stein Sales. South Africa. Archived from the original on 2015-04-02.
- Levine, R.F. (2009-12-01). "David Sinclair in the Driver's Seat". GoErie. Erie, US. Archived from the original on 2015-01-10.
- Polistil giocattoli [Polistil toys] (brochure), 1975, archived from the original on 2011-09-28 – via Mike's diecast tanks and armour
- Politoys by Polistil (advert), "Newsprint ad with Rolls Royce Silver Cloud III Mulliner Park Ward. Ad by U.S. Representative Lynn International Ltd. 200 Fifth Ave, New York"
- Politoys M. (brochure), Politoys APS, 1968
- Rixon, Peter (2005). Miller's Collecting Diecast Vehicles. London: Miller's, A Division of Mitchell Beazley.
- Sinclair, David (1979). "Scale 1:43, a Survey for Collectors". Automobile Quarterly. Vol. 17, no. 4. Princeton, New Jersey. pp. 384–399.
- Sinclair's Auto Miniatures (flyer), 1977, "Typewritten sales flyer"
- Smeed, Vic, ed. (1980). The World of Model Cars. London: Bison Books. ISBN 0-89009-324-5.
