= Bburago =

Toy car brand

- Formerly: Martoys (1974–1976)
- Company type: Private (1974–2005)
- Industry: Manufacturing
- Founded: 1974
- Founder: Mario Besana; Ugo Besana; Martino Besana
- Defunct: 2005; 21 years ago
- Fate: Company defunct, brand rights acquired by May Cheong Group in 2006
- Headquarters: Italy: Burago di Molgora (formerly); Hong Kong (current)
- Owner: May Cheong Group
- Number of employees: 130
- Website: bburago.com

Bburago is a large manufacturing company of toys and die-cast scale model cars formerly based in Italy. The company was based in Burago di Molgora, where all products were made from 1974 to 2005. At the height of its popularity, Bburago's main competitors were Politoys and Maisto, the latter of which was to become dominant in the 1:18 market segment in the late 90's.

In 2006, Hong Kong–based May Cheong Group (owner of the Maisto and later Polistil brands) acquired rights to the "Bburago" brand, taking over the manufacturing operations, which were then shifted to China.

== Martoys ==
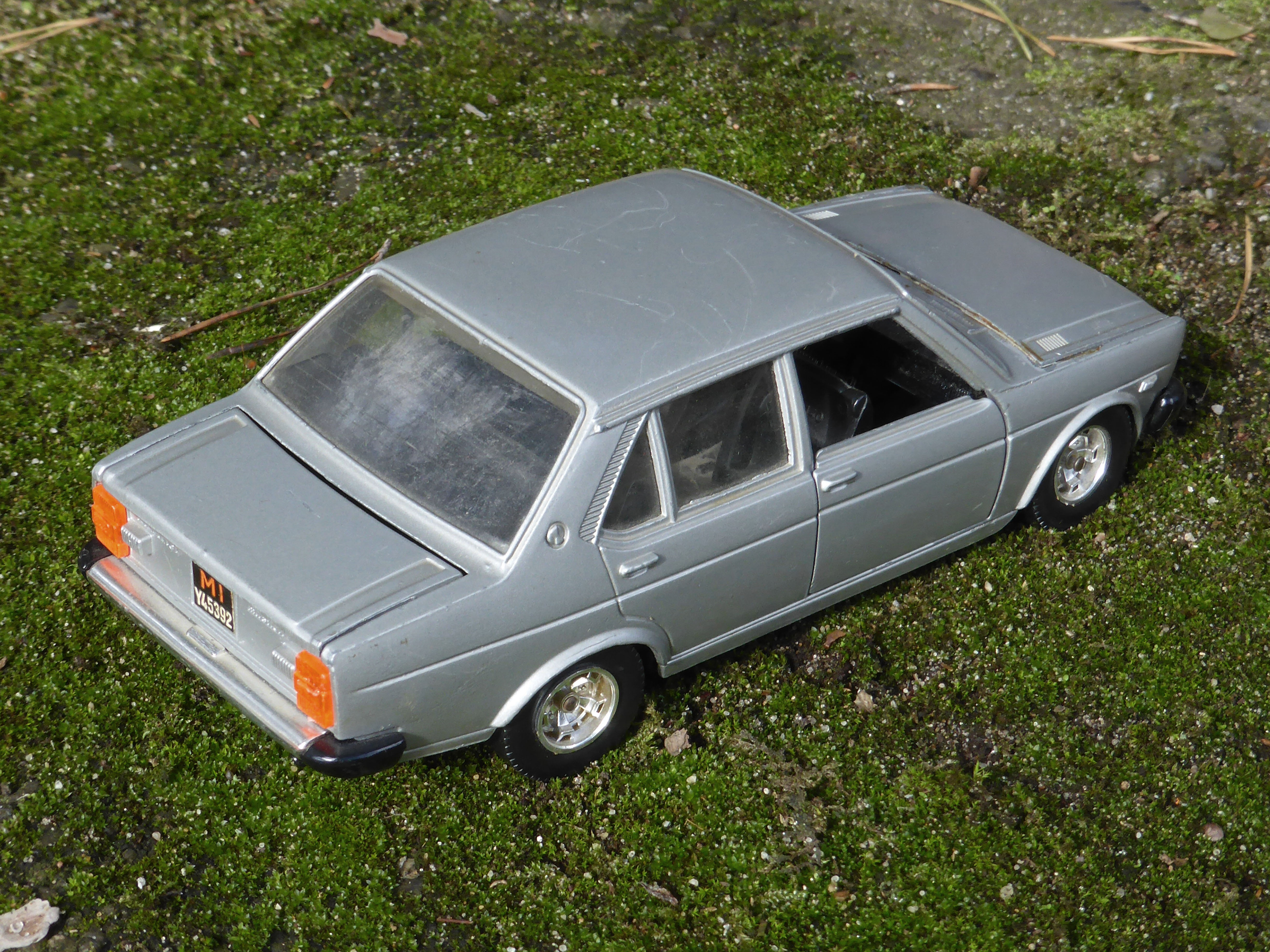
A 1:24 scale model of the Fiat 131 produced initially under the Martoys brand

The company was founded as "Martoys" by the Besana brothers, Ugo, Martino, and Mario, who sold their first well-known brand Mebetoys to Mattel. In the initial years of the company, only models in 1:24 scale were produced. In 1976, after only two years, the Besana brothers renamed the brand "Bburago", with two 'B's at the beginning of the name signifying the surname of the founders as well as the city of Burago di Molgora where the company was based. It is said that the change came to being due to a possible confusion with the classic toy maker Marx Toys, where the 'X' in the logo was often not noticed, thus the company sometimes being referred to as 'Mar Toys'.

=== Models ===
According to the 1975 catalog, there were only nine basic models in the Martoys line-up, though most of these were offered in at least a couple of versions. These models were: Renault Alpine (and Alpine rally), Porsche 911 (S, Carrera RS, and "Polizei"), Fiat 127 (plain, "vigili urbani", and rally), Lancia Stratos (Marlboro or Alitalia), Range Rover (plain and airport fire), Renault 5, BMW 3.0 CS, Lancia Beta, and Audi 80GT. While Mebetoys produced models in 1:43 scale, Martoys however, focused on larger toys in 1:24 and 1:18 scales.

In that catalog, the Audi, BMW, Lancia Beta, Renault 5 and Range Rover were portrayed with photographs of real vehicles, not the models, so there is some doubt about whether all of the proposed line was produced under the Martoys brand, or if some were as yet under development - to be later introduced after the name change to Bburago. A Fiat 131 (plain and Carabinieri) was also apparently produced, but it was not shown in the 1975 catalog. A newsletter/flyer from David Sinclair, perhaps the earliest importer of Martoys to the United States, reported all of the above were available except the Lancia Beta (listed as available later) and the Fiat 131 (not listed at all). The 131 appears to have been the last model to reach production under the Martoys label.

=== Detail and rendering ===
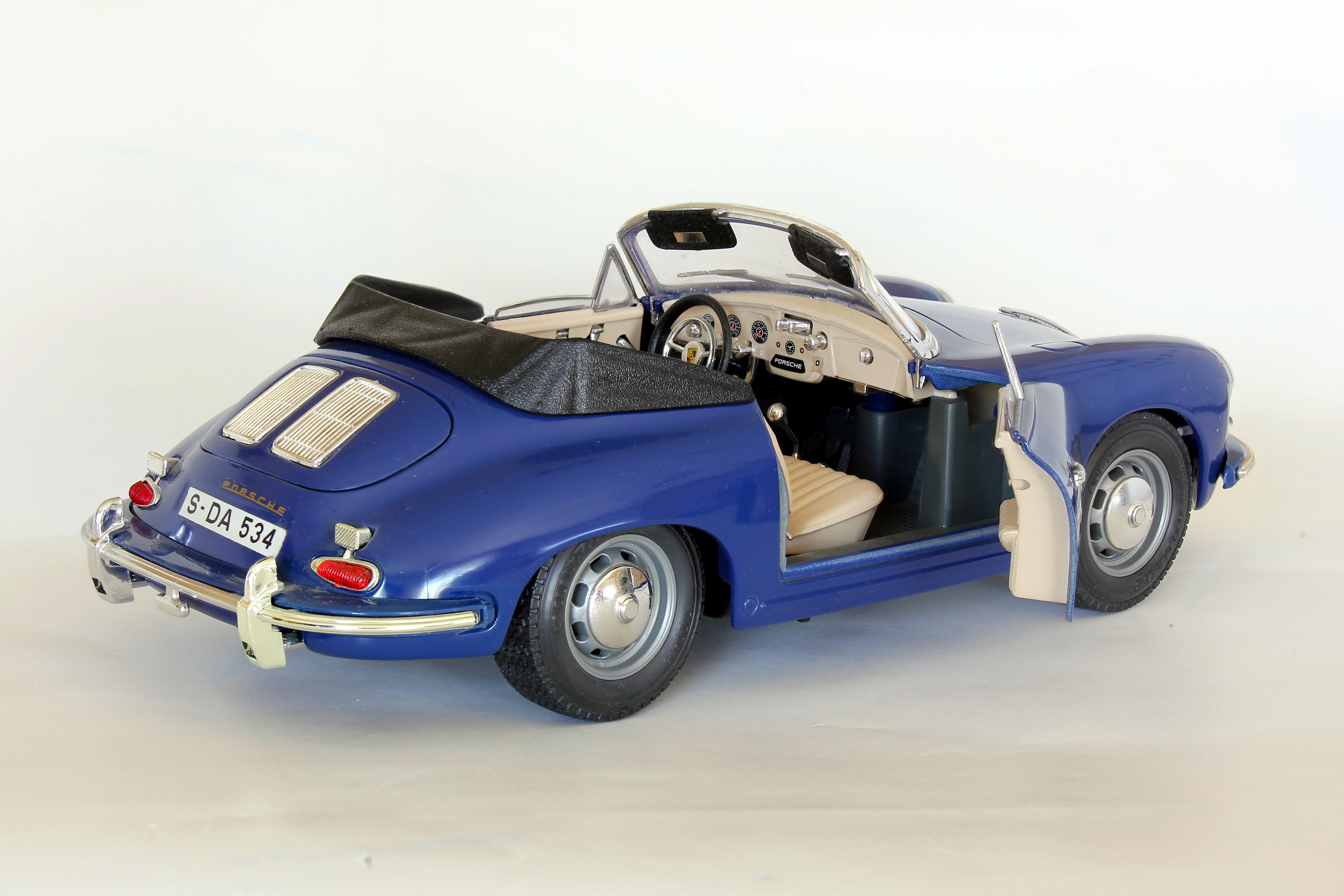
A 1:18 scale model of the Porsche 356 produced by Bburago. The interior details are depicted in the picture

Models were attractive and well-done but this was when larger scales were just becoming (along with Polistil) popular as toys for easier rendering of details - yet before collector and consumer demand for near-perfect rendition occurred through the 1990s. So, some of the Martoys lines simply did not look right. The frames on the opening doors of the Fiat 127 were thick, unrefined and appeared toy-like. The BMW 3.0 CS simply could not capture the delicate fender curves of the real car and grille proportions were squarish. The Porsche 911 had a good amount of details, both in engine, body, lights and script and logo detail but it also suffered from incorrect proportions. Models often required detailing by the owner to enhance the depicted details.

=== Packaging ===
Martoys boxes had two different card-box designs. The older one featured accentuated rounded graphic letters popular in the 1970s. The lettering was overlapped and staggered on top of itself four times, starting with a dark purple blue in the background and fading to lighter and lighter green on top, the 'O' in Martoys formed a three-ring red bulls eye that looked like the Target store symbol. The design was colorful and not subtle –it was more toy-like than collector-like. The boxes featured a picture of the model and not usually the real car (in contrast to fellow Italian manufacturer Polistil's S series which had actual photos of the real automobile). Later, all models had a white box with less flamboyant graphics. As with Polistil's S-series, the box designs did not have the transparent plastic window to see the real model inside that became the standard for all larger-scale toys later on. Printed on the bottom panel of the box were specifications of the real car along with the inclusion of a catalog inside the box.

=== Later history ===
Martoys, never had the chance to develop a firm image for itself. When the name was changed in 1976, none of the graphics or signage was kept and everything was replaced with the new Bburago design. Bburago's trek, even under an onslaught of larger-scale toys and collectibles has lasted since its inception, though it was finally acquired by the May Cheong Group in 2006 after facing bankruptcy, a fate similar to competitor Polistil. A perusal of the company history and vision on the official Bburago website under the new owners says nothing about Martoys, though one could say that Martoys was in many ways the first mover in the large scale diecast model manufacturing that was to become more common in the 1980s and 1990s

According to the report on the previous owner's whereabouts on the Gran Toros website, Martino Besana had died around 1993. As of 2008, Mario was suffering from cancer, but Ugo was in good health. Ugo (then in his 80s) with his wife had founded the Vivien Company making toy irons and ironing boards - products similar to those made in the early days of Mebetoys.

== Bburago ==
=== Early models ===
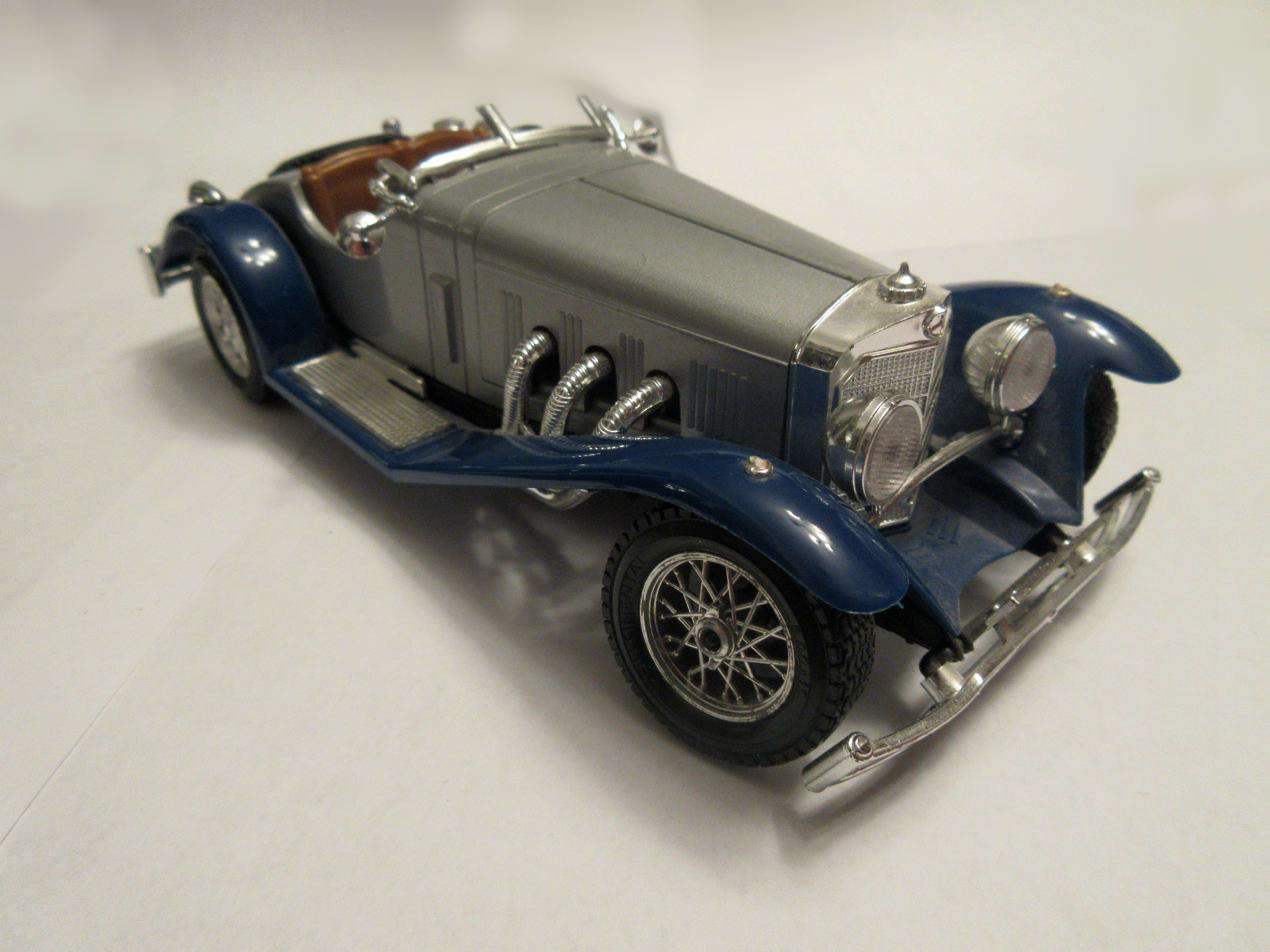
The Mercedes-Benz SSK in 1:24 scale made by Bburago

One of the earliest Bburago lines was a series of 1:43 scale Fiat trucks, but these seem to have disappeared by about 1980, according to. Continuing the Martoys lineup, however, most models were produced initially in 1/24 scale and mostly represented contemporary European sports and saloon cars. Most were well detailed for the price and included many opening features.

Later, a range of 1:18 scale vehicles was produced which was to become the "bread and butter" of Bburago offerings. In the mid-1980s, a new 1/43 scale line was introduced. As they were held together by screws, models in 1/24 and 1/18 were also commonly sold in kit form (later, 1/43 kits appeared as well).

While vehicles in the kit ranges used the same castings as their contemporaries in the fully assembled ranges, the kits often depicted different versions, usually in racing or rally style. Bburago kits were notorious for featuring waterslide decals which never adhered properly to the models, making well-built examples of the kits rare. Conversely, the decals on factory-built products were of the stuck-on the body of the models, rather than the tampo printing used by the likes of the contemporary Maisto.

=== Larger scales ===
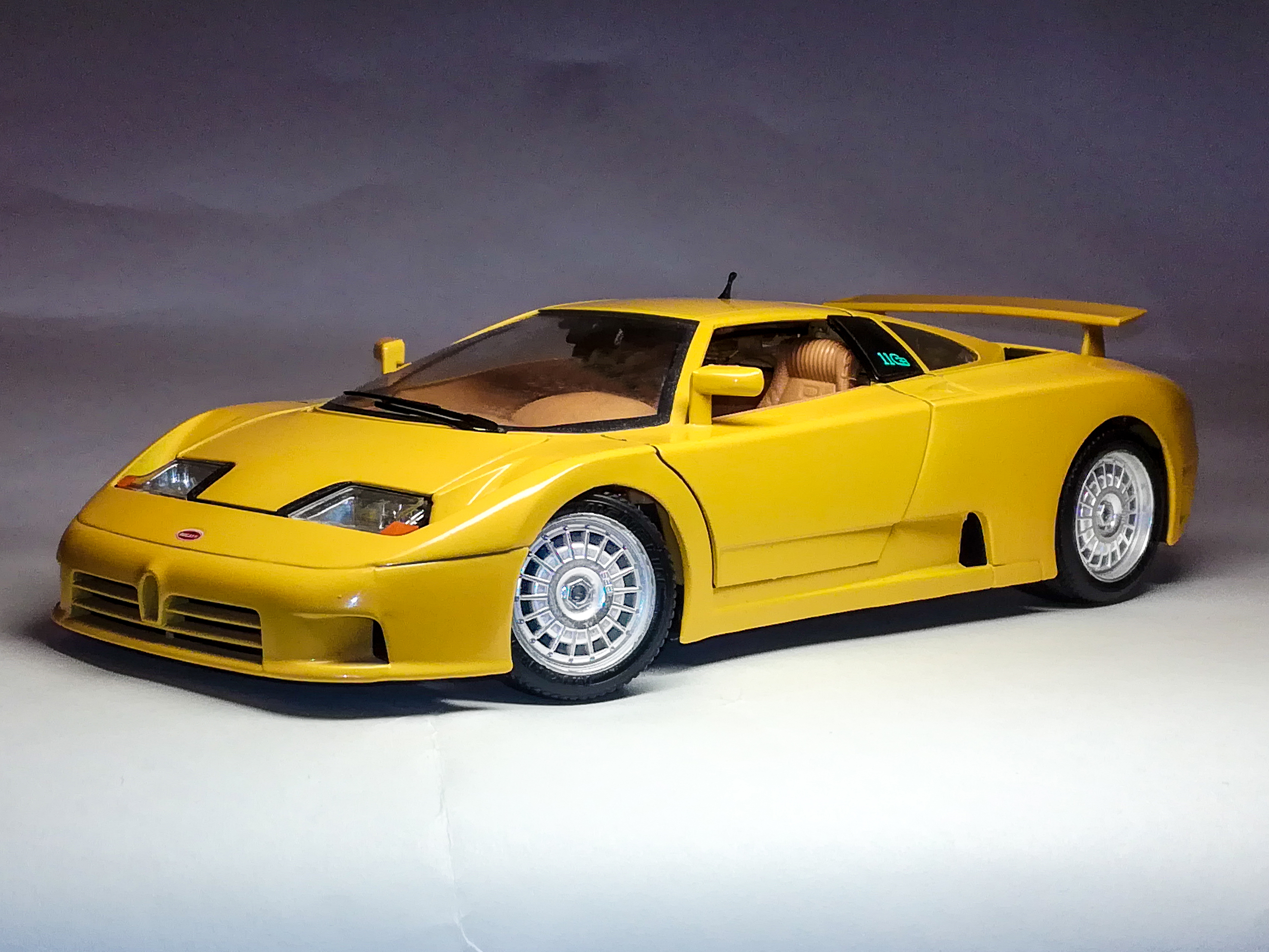
Bugatti EB110 in 1/18 scale

Originally, the 1/18 scale range was aimed more at collectors rather than children, and the brand was the link between European niche marketing in 1:43 scale and the 1:18 scale surge that occurred during the 1990s. Bburago was the first manufacturer to make this scale as the main offering of the company, after Schuco, Gama, and Polistil pioneered larger offerings, but by the end of the 1970s were going out of business. Bburago was also a contemporary of the mail order offerings of the Franklin Mint Precision Models which were pricier, but sometimes of spotty quality.

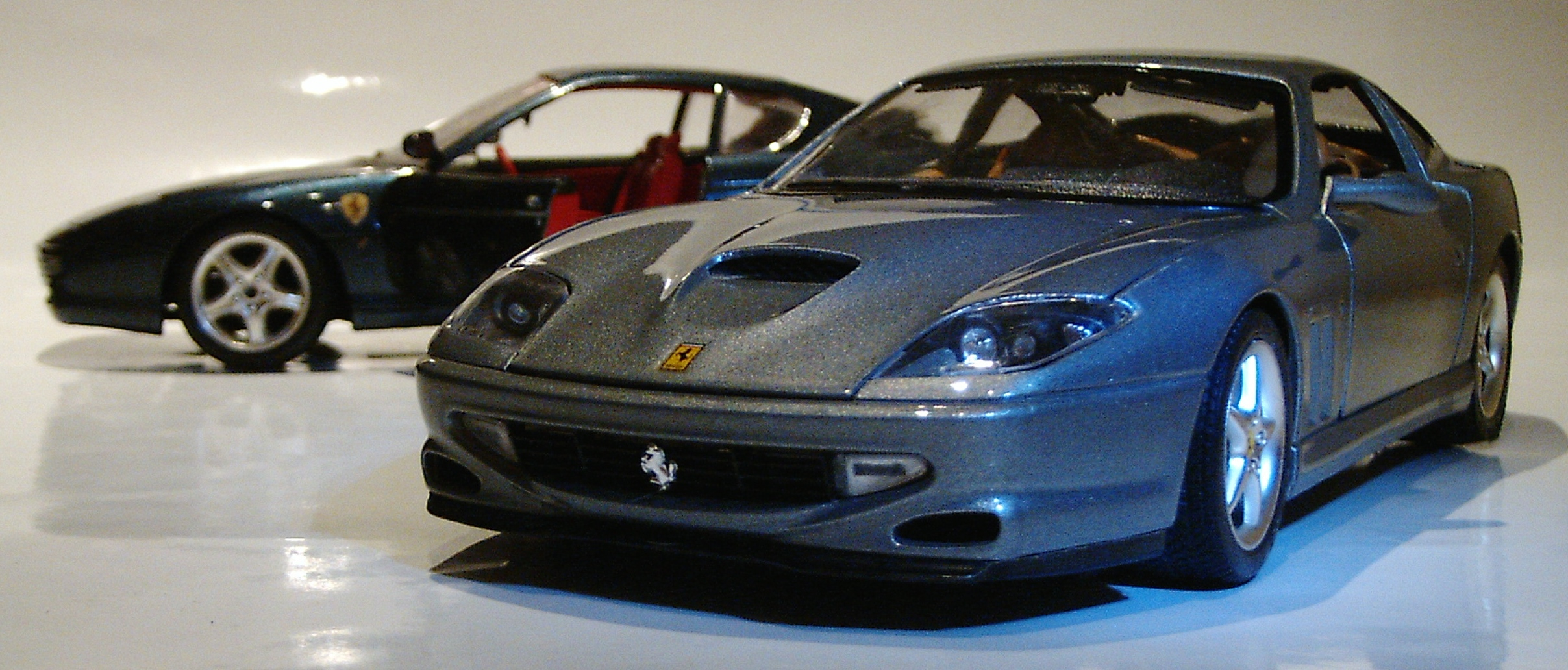
Ferrari scale models in 1:18 scale made by Bburago (the Ferrari 550 is in the foreground and the Ferrari 456 is in the background

Bburago did not, however, stick strictly to 1:18 scale, also offering smaller scale models like the Renault Alpine A110 and the Fiat 500 in 1:16 scale and larger vehicles like the Ford F-150 pickup in 1:21 scale. 1:24 scale was also a regular offering from the brand. The Ford pickup, however, is an exception as European marques were a main focus of the Italian company. At first, offerings consisted mostly of 1930s cars, but later, more 1950s and 1960s models were introduced, like the Jaguar XK-E roadster. Finally, many contemporary high-performance automobiles from the likes of Lamborghini and Ferrari were made and some of these were the company's most popular sellers.

For cost savings, models were often duplicated from one scale to another. The "Diamond", "Super", and "Gold" ranges were the main lines in a 1/18 scale with over 30 different models. Each vehicle would be offered in two or three colors and often in different body styles as with the real car. Differences in the ranges are hard to discern, but the Super line was more aligned with classic cars, while the Gold series had more deluxe packaging.

There were also several model lines in the 1:24 scale. These included the Grand Prix, Bijoux, VIP, and Super lines. The Super series included many normal coupes, sedans, and micro cars in rally and police liveries, with 45 different models. The Grand Prix line consisted of ten Formula One and Indy Cars.

The larger models usually had all apertures opening, had detailed engines, spare tires in trunks, working steering, windshield wipers and detailed instrument panels. A number of models also featured active suspension and removable wheels. Earlier models used plastic for door and bonnet openings. These parts sometimes hindered fit and finish, and, after extended play, would stretch or bend, causing hoods and doors to not close properly.

=== Smaller scales ===
Bburago's 1:43 scale "Pocket" series consisted of about 36 offerings in about 60 separate liveries. These had simple 'Hot Wheels' inspired chrome on hard plastic tires, and no opening features. Though oriented more towards children in price (often selling for only a couple of dollars), the 1:43 models' detail was excellent and the presentation, like the early Saab 900 or the long lived MCA/Mega Monte Carlo model (one version with Russian MIG sponsorship), were quite attractive. Bburago also offered several models in a 1/64 scale. Most models do not have opening features.

=== Competition increases and closure ===
By the end of the 1990s, Bburago no longer had a large market share in the 1/18 collector market, as many competitors of both high-end and budget oriented markets were now producing models in this scale. Some of these competitors were Exoto, Maisto, Yatming, Ertl, Mira, Revell, Jouef, Chrono, Anson and also Mattel (under their Hot Wheels brand), to name a few. Maisto became the main budget diecast brand in larger scales and began to eclipse most other manufacturers in that market segment.

Many of these companies had an edge in profitability as their products could be produced with far cheaper labour in Thailand and China, while Bburago continued with more expensive production in Italy making the profit margins rather thin. In October 2005, Bburago declared bankruptcy, and the receivers were called in. Many companies expressed interest in the tooling. Fortunately, the venerable brand name of Bburago was not left to die as it was finally purchased by May Cheong (Maisto) from the bankruptcy court in 2006. This essentially marked the end of Italian mass-produced (and also one of the last European manufactured) affordable diecast vehicles.

Prior to its closure, the company was also hit hard by the grant of an exclusive promotional contract granted to Mattel for the production of scale models of Ferrari vehicles. As a large sum of money had been invested in the tooling to produce Ferrari scale models which had become the company's mainstay in its product offerings, the company was adversely affected by this decision. Although, Bburago would go on to produce Ferrari scale models once again, but this time it would be under its new owners after the contract was granted to parent company May Cheong Group.

In the beginning of 2007, the name was relaunched by May Cheong, which markets Maisto, so the situation is analogous to Mattel owning both Hot Wheels and Matchbox. In order for both lines to be successful, it was decided by the new owners to make Bburago's offerings of scale models oriented to European vehicles. A count from the two brands' websites in 2023 confirms the two approaches. Out of 24 1/18 scale model cars, Bburago only has one model that is not of a European car.

Maisto, with a total of 53 total 1/18 scale models, on the other hand, has about 35 non-European models or 64% non-European models. May Cheong believes it can avoid internal competition among brands by having Maisto carry a more global selection of marques. Many of the earlier Bburago models made at the time of the May Cheong takeover are now being produced again in Thailand and China, along with new castings.

== Scale models 1/24 (Italian production) ==
- AC Shelby Cobra 289
- Alfa Romeo Alfetta GTV
- Alfa Romeo Alfetta GTV Gr.4
- Alfa Romeo Giulia
- Alfa Romeo Giulietta
- Alfa Romeo 33
- Alfa Romeo 75
- Alfa Romeo 156
- Alpine A110 (1ª Serie)
- Alpine A110 (2ª Serie)
- Audi 80 Gt
- Audi RS5
- Audi Quattro Gt
- Audi TT Coupé
- Austin Metro MG Turbo
- BMW 3.0 Csi
- BMW 3.0 Csi Turbo
- BMW 635 Csi Gr.A
- BMW M1
- BMW M3 E36 GTR
- BMW Z3 M Roadster
- BMW Z4 Roadster
- BMW Z8 Roadster
- Bugatti Type 55
- Bugatti Type 57 Atlantic
- Bugatti EB 110
- Chevrolet Corvette '57
- Chevrolet Corvette C5
- Chevrolet Corvette C5 Convertible
- Citroen 15 CV T.A.
- Citroën 2 CV
- Datsun 240 Z
- Datsun 280 Z
- Dodge Viper RT/10
- Dodge Viper GTS
- Dodge Viper SRT/10
- DS 3
- Ferrari 250 Testarossa
- Ferrari 250 GTO
- Ferrari 250 LM
- Ferrari 275 GTB / 4
- Ferrari 512 BB
- Ferrari 308 GTB
- Ferrari 288 GTO
- Ferrari Testarossa
- Ferrari F40
- Ferrari 348 tb
- Ferrari 456 Gt
- Ferrari F50
- Ferrari 550 Maranello
- Fiat Nuova 500 '57
- Fiat 124 Abarth Spider
- Fiat 127
- Fiat 131 Abarth Rally
- Fiat 131 Mirafiori
- Fiat Ritmo Abarth
- Fiat Panda
- Fiat Regata
- Fiat Uno
- Fiat Tipo
- Fiat Cinquecento
- Fiat Punto
- Fiat Punto Evo
- Fiat Nuova Panda
- Ford Escort MkII 1.1 L
- Ford Escort MkII RS 1800
- Ford Capri Group 5
- Ford Mustang
- Ford Escort MkIII XR3i
- Ford Escort MkIV RS Cosworth
- Ford Focus RS
- Ford Focus SW
- Ford Streetka
- Innocenti Mini 120
- Jaguar XK 120 Coupé
- Jaguar XK 120 Roadster
- Jeep CJ 7
- Lamborghini Cheetah
- Lamborghini Countach
- Lamborghini Diablo
- Lamborghini Murciélago
- Lancia Beta Berlina
- Lancia Beta Montecarlo
- Lancia Stratos
- Lancia 037 Rally
- Lancia Delta S4
- Lancia Ypsilon
- Land Rover Range Rover
- Land Rover 110
- Land Rover Freelander
- Land Rover Range Rover '94
- Lexus IS
- Lotus 97T
- Matra Simca Bagheera
- Mazda RX-7
- Mercedes-Benz SSK
- Mercedes-Benz 300 SL '54
- Mercedes-Benz 450 SEL
- Mercedes-Benz 450 SLC
- Mercedes-Benz 500 SEC
- Mercedes-Benz 190 E
- Mini Cooper '60
- Mini Cooper '01
- Opel Kadett C Coupé
- Opel Kadett C Gte Gr.4
- Opel Ascona 400
- Peugeot 205 T16
- Peugeot 206 CC
- Peugeot 207
- Peugeot 405 T16
- Porsche 356 B Cabriolet
- Porsche 356 B Coupé
- Porsche 911 S
- Porsche 911 Turbo
- Porsche 924 Turbo
- Porsche 935 TT
- Porsche 959 Turbo
- Porsche 993 Coupé
- Porsche 993 Cabriolet
- Porsche 996 Coupé
- Porsche 996 GT3
- Porsche Cayenne
- Renault 4 L
- Renault 5 L
- Renault 5 Alpine
- Renault 14 TL
- Renault 5 Turbo Gr.4
- Renault Fuego
- Renault Twingo RS Gordini
- Rolls-Royce Silver Shadow
- Saab 900 Turbo
- Schlesser Buggy Megane
- Shelby Series 1
- Smart Roadster
- Talbot Matra Rancho
- Toyota Celica Gr.5
- Volkswagen Golf MkI Gti
- Volkswagen Golf MkIV
- Volkswagen Polo MkV GTI
- Volkswagen New Beetle
- Volkswagen New Beetle Cup
- Volkswagen New Beetle Convertible
- Volkswagen California

== Sources ==
- Force, Edward (1992). Classic Miniature Vehicles Made in Italy. West Chester PA: Schiffer. ISBN 0-88740-433-2.

== See also ==
- Model car
