= Maisto =

Chinese brand of die-cast model cars

- Product type: Die-cast model cars
- Current owner: May Cheong Group (1990–present)
- Country: China
- Introduced: 1990; 36 years ago
- Markets: Worldwide

Maisto is a Chinese brand of scale model vehicles introduced in 1990 and owned by May Cheong Group, a Chinese company founded in 1967 in Hong Kong by brothers P.Y. Ngan and Y.C Ngan. Headquartered in Hong Kong, the brand has its offices in the United States, France and China. MCG also owns other model car brands, such as the former Italian brand Bburago (whose assets and rights to whose brand name were acquired in 2006) and Polistil.

The company has also manufactured a number of Tonka products under license from Hasbro. Products under the Maisto brand include die-cast scale model cars.

== Company history ==
May Cheong Group
- Formerly: May Cheong Toy Company
- Type: Private
- Industry: Manufacturing
- Founded: 1967; 59 years ago
- Headquarters: Hong Kong
- Key people: P. Y. Ngan (CEO); Katherine Ngan (President)
- Products: Die-cast model cars
- Brands: Maisto (1990–present); Bburago (2006–present); Polistil
- Subsidiaries: Maisto International Inc. (US); Maisto France
- Website: maycheonggroup.com

The company was established in Hong Kong in 1967 as "May Cheong Toy Company" by brothers P.Y. Ngan and Y.C Ngan. Products were initially commercialised under the "MC Toy" (using the initials of the company) brand.

Some of the first MC Toys products were direct copies of Matchbox cars, although the firm had original designs as well. Soon after, European cars were added to its range of products. MC produced models of European cars which were not made by Matchbox or Hot Wheels, and the brand became popular for providing the same quality as its contemporaries at cheap prices.

In the mid-1980s, Intex Recreation introduced MC Toy products to the US market with some of the die-cast cars being labeled as Intex. In the late 1980s, MC Toys' vehicles increased their quality, becoming more realistic and accurate to real models, in contrast with other counterpart companies that produced toy-like cars. In 1990, the company introduced the "Maisto" brand of diecast cars. Through the 1990s, Maisto was considered the US division of Master Toy Co. Ltd. of Thailand with May Cheong being the Kowloon, Hong Kong, subsidiary.

The May Cheong Group products are made in China and Thailand. The factories in China and Thailand manufacture 1:12, 1:18, 1:24, 1:25, 1:27, 1:43, 1:31 and 1:64 scale replicas. Most models are officially licensed products, based on popular vehicles. Some models, however, are fantastical hot-rod and custom creations more in line with the Hot Wheels formula. The US warehouse and distribution center, aka Maisto International, Inc, is located in Fontana, California.

In 2006, the May Cheong Group acquired the assets of the Italian brand Bburago. Later, the firm also obtained the Polistil name, another Italian scale model manufacturer that had previously gone bankrupt in 1993.

== Automobiles ==
Maisto mainly competed in 1:18 scale with Italian Bburago, Polistil and the more expensive Franklin Mint Precision Models. By 2000, a whole host of companies like Yatming, Ertl, AUTOart and even Mattel's Hot Wheels had entered the larger scale 1:18 fray and the market segment became more saturated and competitive. In the budget 1:18 scale category, many competitors left the market after the mid-2000s and Maisto faced little to no competition with the company moving upmarket itself with its Exclusive line of model cars featuring finer details than the more commonly available Premiere and Special Edition lines.

Maisto scale models in 1:18 scale usually have opening features all around with adequately appointed engines and interiors. The models have nearly perfectly proportioned bodies and usually have excellently researched detail considering models are mass-produced in the hundreds of thousands and the fact that the brand belongs to the budget category of diecast scale models. Due to the mass manufacturing nature of the models, there are some inconsistencies and omission of finer details such as the paint application, which might be too thick or not uniform, and details that should be chrome are often painted silver. Body panels may be uneven, lights unrealistic, and the trim rather thick and gaudy. Muscle Machines magazine noted that the 1963 Dodge 330 Hemi was completely devoid of any indication of a gear shift of any type (even push button on the dash). Collectors wanting finer crafting in this size must look to AUTOart, CMC, or Exoto at the higher dollar end of miniature modeling.

1/64 scale Maisto die-cast models are comparable in quality and details to Matchbox, Hot Wheels and Johnny Lightning, but new models in this scale are not released very often. Even some models use similar castings from older Matchbox and Hot Wheels models. Newer lines offer vehicles in more customized themes. One such line is the AllStarz which features custom rims, special paint jobs, lowered suspension and super upgraded in-car entertainment systems. Another line is Pro Rodz which uses the same themes but consists of classic American muscle cars. Both lines are in direct competition with 'Jada Toys' 'Dub City' and 'Big Time Muscle' brands that started the 'bling' trends in auto toys.

Around late 2010, Maisto toys sold in Wal-Mart stores took on the name 'Adventure Wheels' on all Maisto packaging with red-orange and yellow gold box and blister pack colors with black trim.

Maisto produces many licensed properties that reflected contemporary promotional and industry trends. For example, it is an official licensee of Harley-Davidson Motorcycle Company. Chrysler is a big user of Maisto for promo models - one example was the offering of three different versions of the PT Cruiser (stock, sport and panel) made available first to auto journalists, but later sold normally in Walmart and other stores. The brand is popularly seen in Sam's Club and often makes exclusive editions of its model cars intended to be sold at the store which feature special paint schemes not commonly found on the regular variations of the model.

== Lines ==
=== Vehicles ===
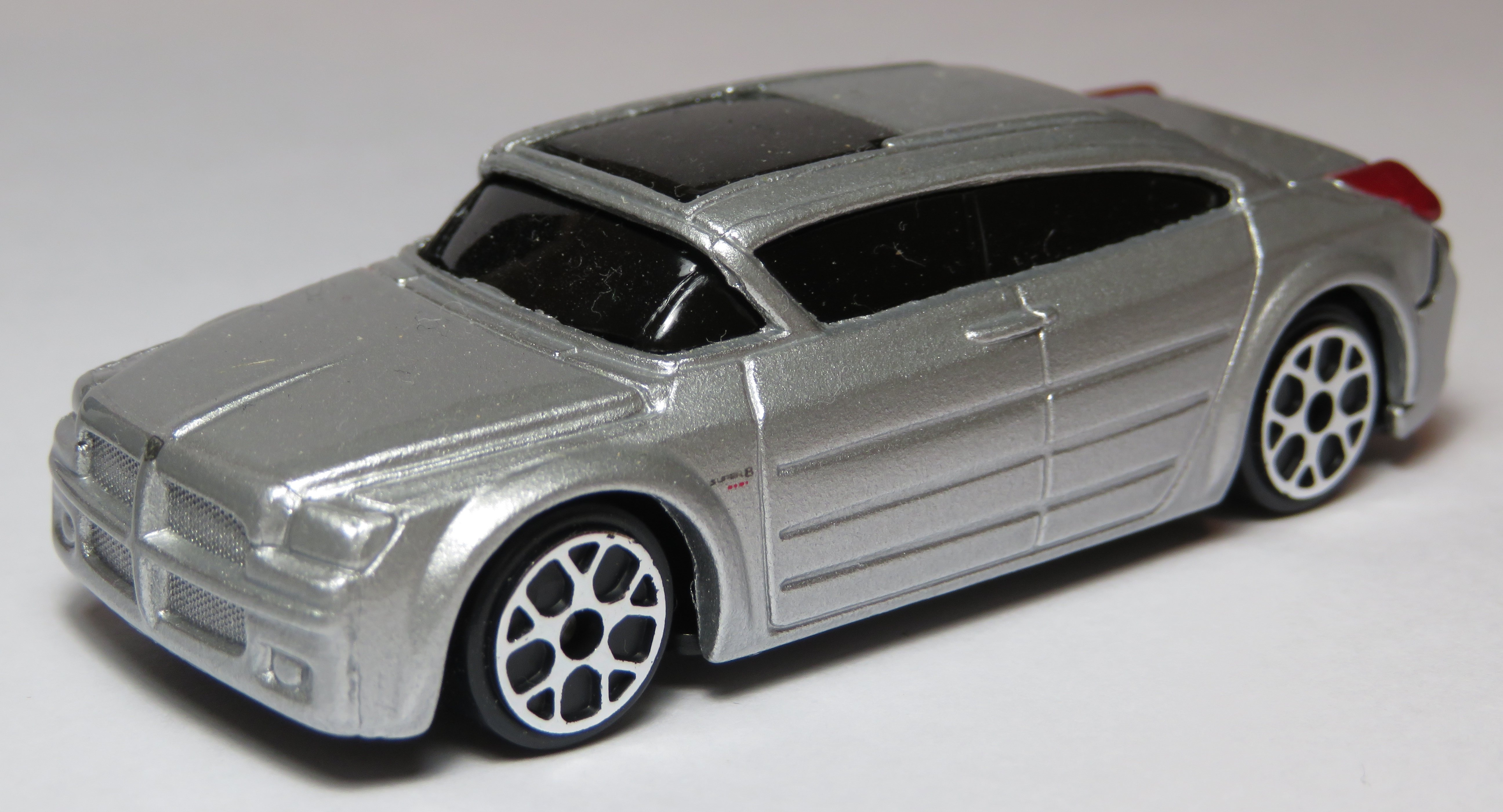
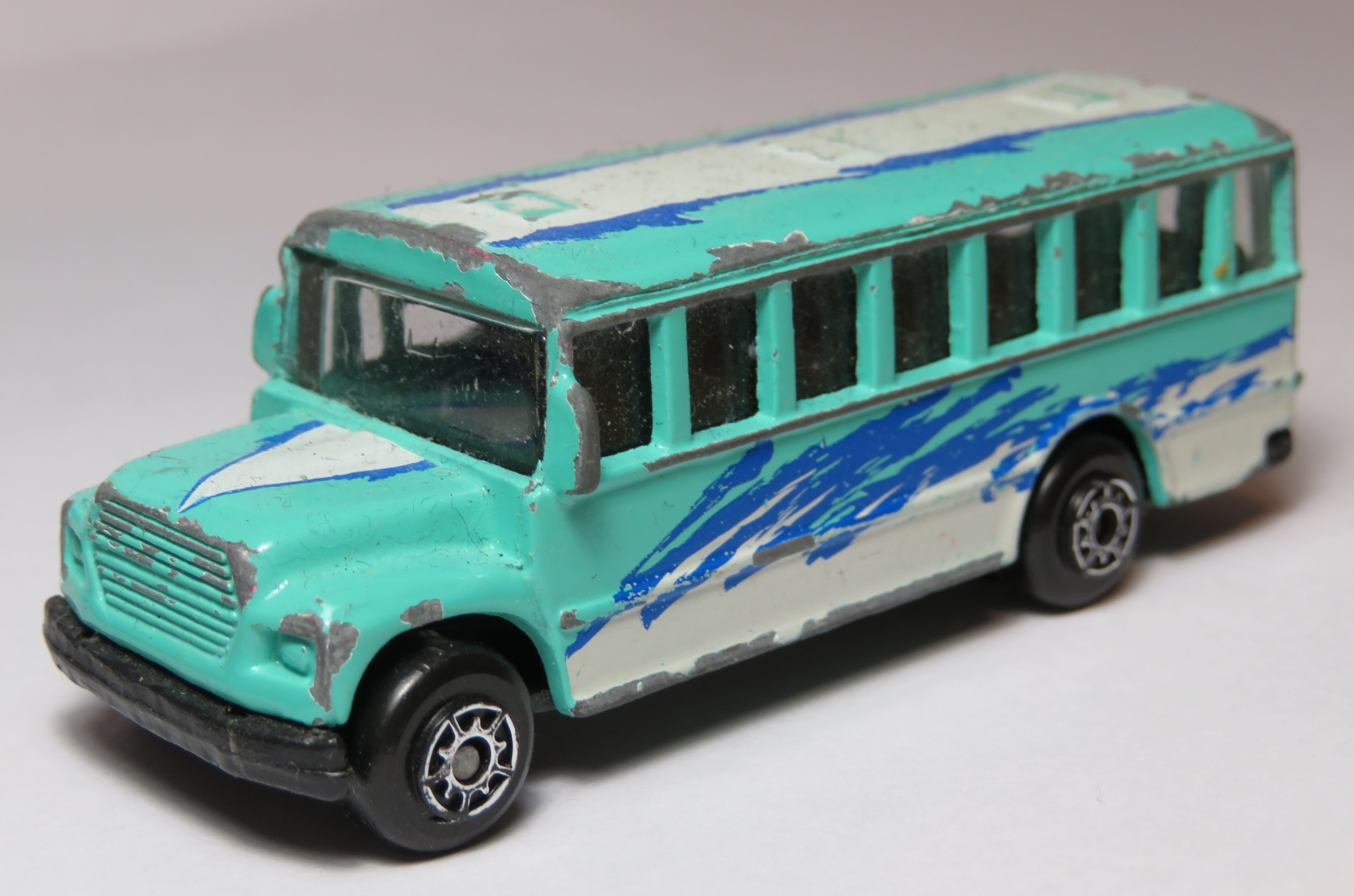
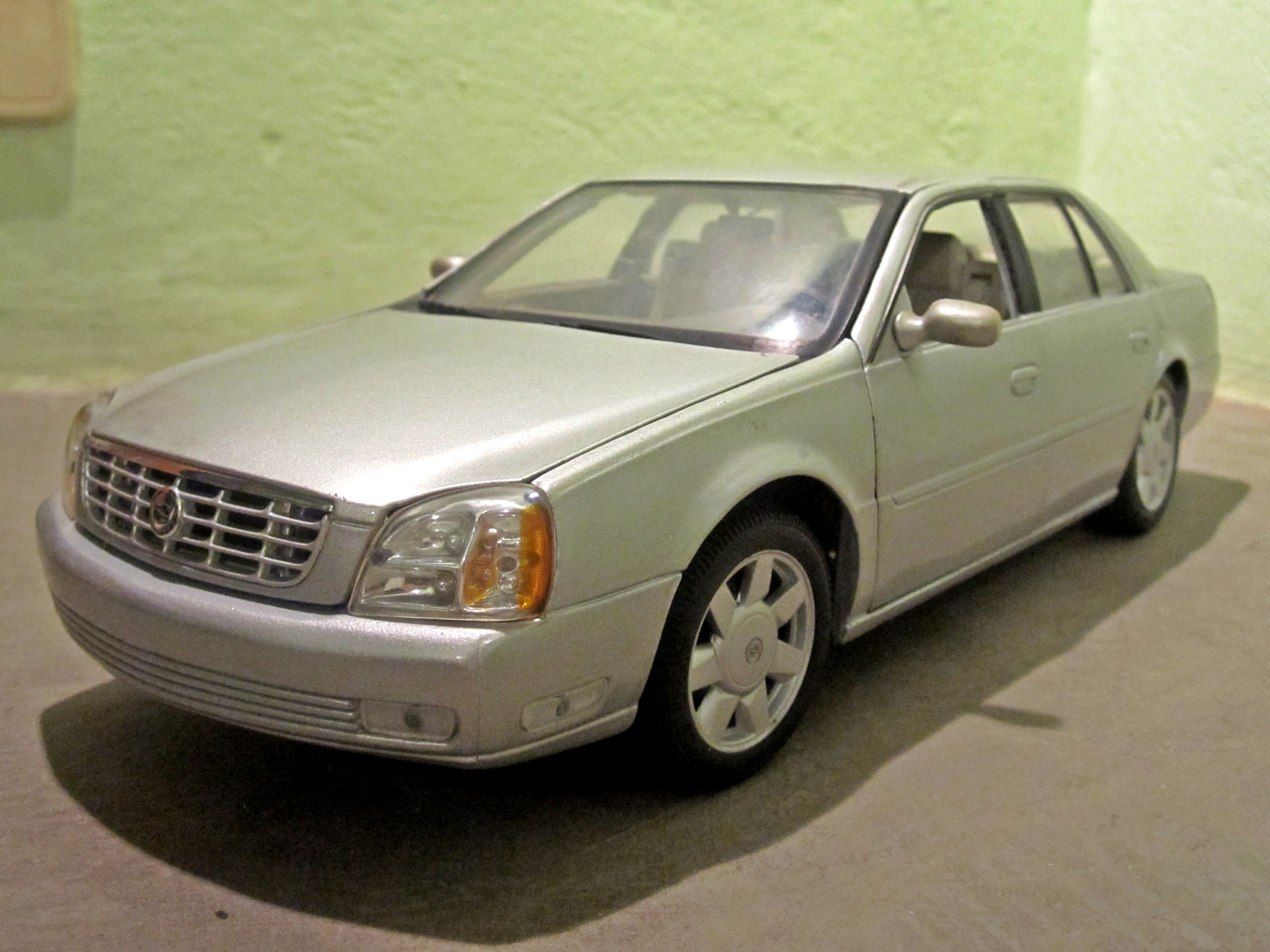
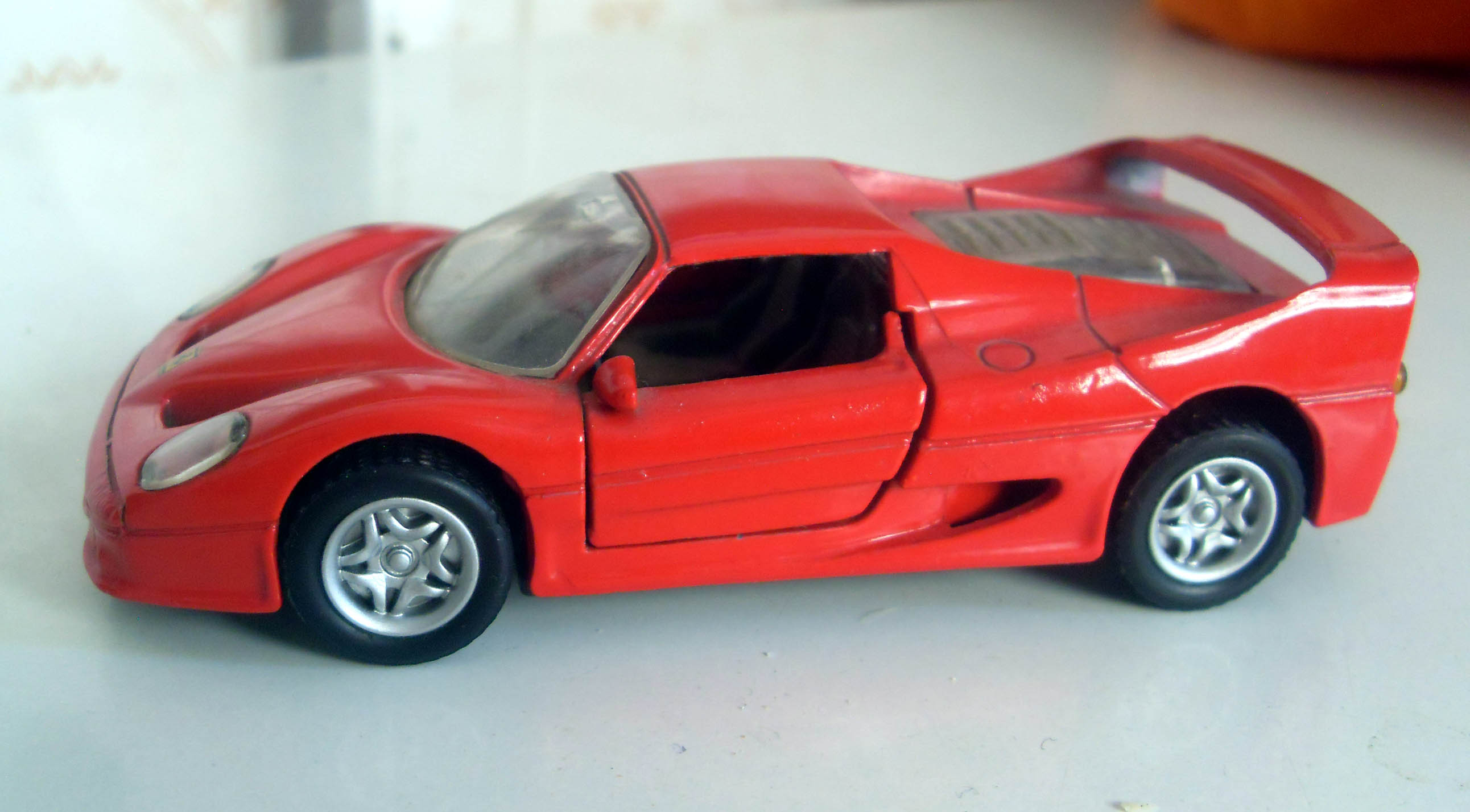
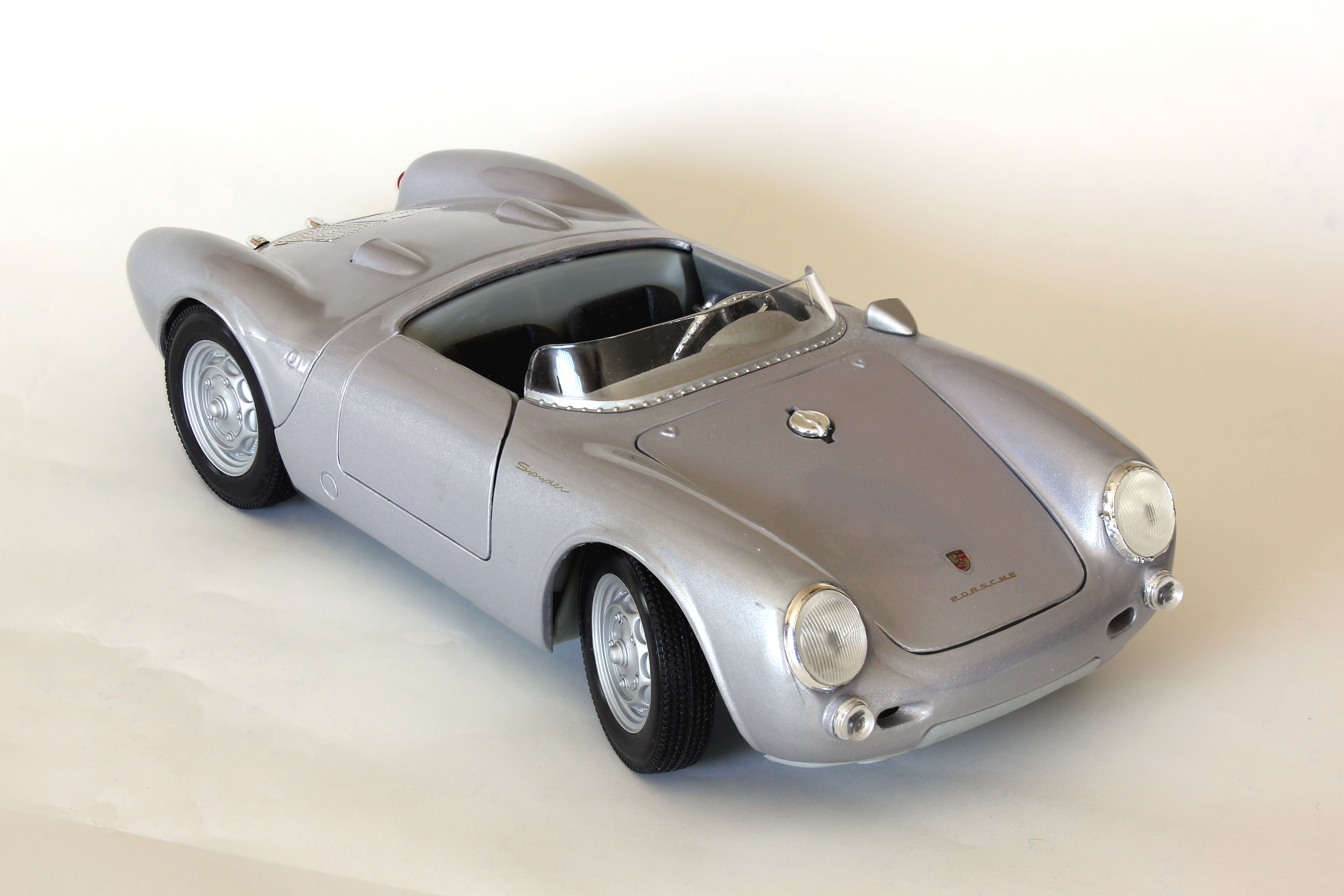
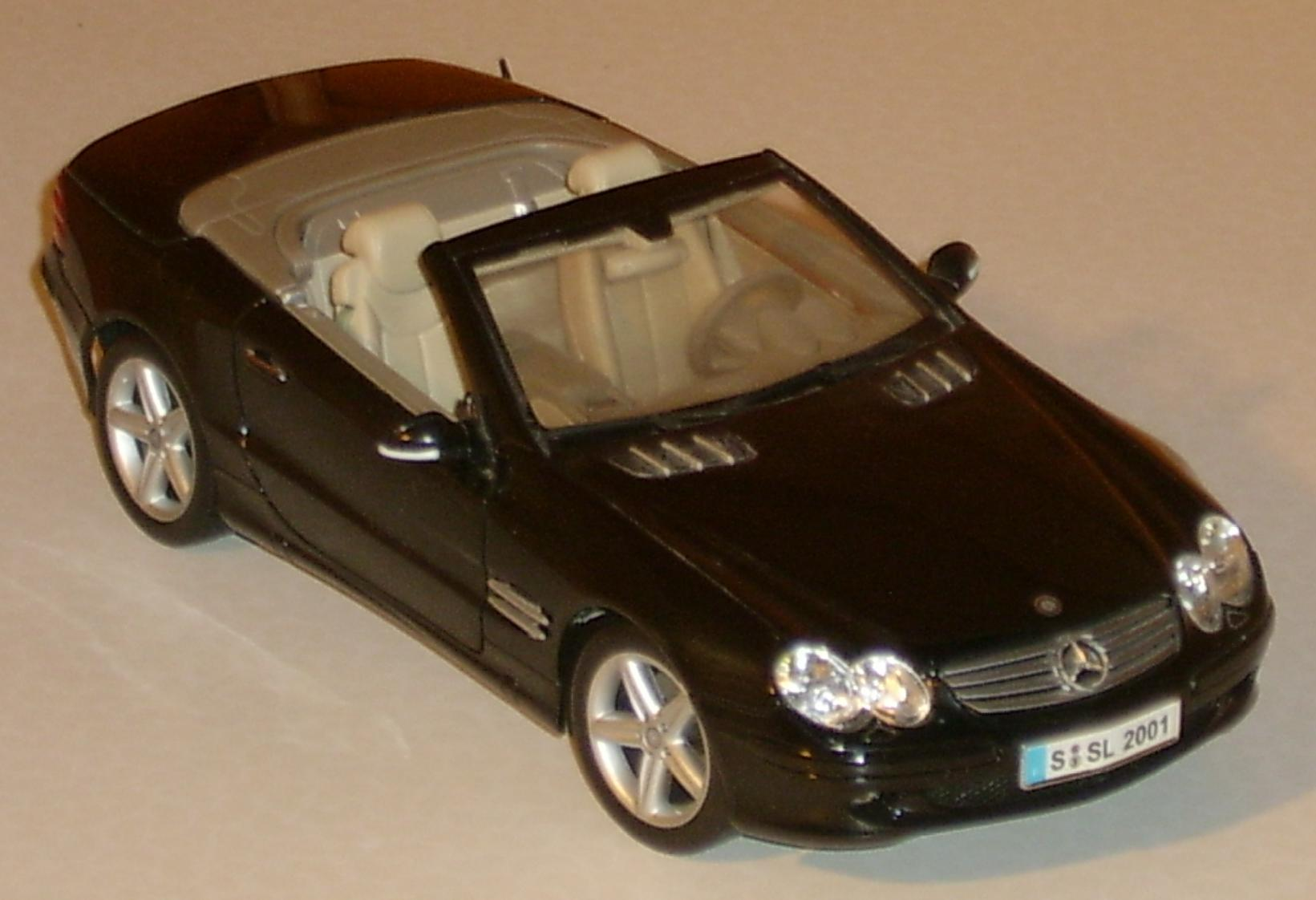
Some Maisto models, fltr (above): Dodge Super 8 Hemi concept, Ford bus, Cadillac DeVille, Ferrari F50, Porsche 550, Mercedes Benz SL
- Exclusive Edition- Higher end vehicle range featuring extra levels of detail. These include photo-etched badges, extra coats of paint, side windows for the opening doors, and finer painted details in the interior and engine bay.
- Special Edition - Mid-range vehicle replicas. The models are mounted on plastic display stand.
- Premiere Edition - Vehicle replicas with clear plastic casing over display stand. No real quality difference over Special Edition.
- Assembly Line - Ready-to-build diecast vehicles. Includes Ferrari models.
- GT Racing - Replicas of race cars from the Deutsche Tourenwagen Masters (German Touring Car Championship) and 24 Hours of Le Mans series.
- AllStars - Scale replica 'bling' vehicles with lowered suspension, larger wheels, custom interiors and special paint jobs. Formerly marketed as Playerz.
- AllStars Red - Target-exclusive lineup, which consists of 100 different models.
- Pro Rodz - American muscle cars with custom wheels, interior and paint jobs. Some 1:18 and 1:24 models are also available as assembly kits.
- Pro Rodz Pro Street - American muscle cars modified with larger engines and thicker tires for drag racing.
- TLUGZ - 1:24 scale plastic vehicles with 2½" block character figures.
- Hummer World - Maisto's exclusive lineup of Hummer vehicles.
- Muscle Machines - 1/18,1/24 and 1/64 scale first produced by Funline in 1999, then taken over by Maisto. Cartoonish, but accurately detailed rods with bloated wheels and large engines.
- Show Stoppers - 1:18 scale set that includes a towing vehicle, a trailer, and a vehicle being towed.

=== Motorcycles, bicycles, and aircraft ===
- Motorcycles - Lineup consists of Harley-Davidson official licensed products, MotoGP racers, Vespa scooters, stock motorcycles and the Dodge Tomahawk Concept Bike.
- Wild Rides - Custom choppers with matching helmets.
- Tour de Maisto - 1:12 scale replica bicycles.
- Fresh Metal - Tailwinds - 1:87 die-cast historic and modern-era military helicopters and airplanes. Plastic stand with aircraft name included. Also some ~1:550 scale diecast airliners.
- Tow and Show - 1:18 scale motorcycle and motorcycle trailer sets. Consists of Harley-Davidson official licensed motorcycles.

=== Railroad ===
- Maisto On Track - A variety of railroad engines and rail cars in a scale ratio of 1/131.
- Maisto Power On Track - .

=== Smaller scale ===
- Tonka Classic - Replicas of classic Tonka vehicles.
- Chuck & Friends - 3" cartoon vehicles that are part of the Tonka Collection.
- Fresh Metal - Power Racers - 4.5" die-cast vehicles with pull-back motors.
- Gascaps - Super-deformed vehicles, similar to Jada Toys' Chub City line.
- Need for Speed: Undercover - Promotional die-cast for Need for Speed: Undercover game. Each car has a cheat code to unlock the in-game version of the car.

=== Radio-controlled vehicles ===
- Custom R/C Shop - Radio-controlled versions of AllStars and Pro Rodz vehicles.
- Street Troopers: Mobilized Attack Vehicles - R/C vehicles that can transform into attack modes and fire foam projectiles.
- Monster Drift RC - R/C vehicles with hard plastic tires and 4 wheel drive, optimized for drifting.
