= Mebetoys =

Italian scale model manufacturer

- Type: Private (1959–69)
- Founded: 1959
- Founder: Ugo and Martino Besana
- Defunct: 1969; 57 years ago
- Fate: Acquired by Mattel in 1969, became a brand
- Headquarters: Italy
- Products: Die-cast scale model cars

Meccanica Besana Toys (mostly known for its acronym and tradename Mebetoys), was an Italian toy manufacturer that produced die-cast scale model cars during the 1960s and 1970s.

The company was purchased by Mattel in 1969, which continued commercialising Mebetoy as one of its brands. Mebetoy's main competition in Italy was the earlier trailblazer Mercury, Polistil and the rarer Ediltoys.

== History ==
Mebetoys was started by Ugo and Martino Besana in 1959 in Oleggio Castello, Italy. Their brother Mario Besana joined the company in 1967, one year after the company started. A diecast car line was started that same year, rather late compared to the entry of many other companies in the early-to-mid-1950s. In detail and proportion, Mebetoys joined superior model producers of French Solido and fellow Italian Polistil, in many ways these became the triumvirate of diecast models on the European continent, though Danish Tekno and Italian Rio Models also were important. Models were exact to scale with many moving parts, and generally more sophisticated than venerable British producers Corgi and Dinky Toys.

== Model details ==
Mebetoys models were known for well-done castings. Some were very clever model selections such as the Autobianchi A66 Elaf petroleum with a roof luggage rack carrying two large plastic oil barrels, or the Porsche 912 Rally (a 911 in rally form) with rock guards in thin yellow plastic strips covering the front windshield and hood and also featuring red and chrome body and bumper supports which extended from front to rear bumper. This car, in 1:43 scale, was topped off, literally, with three spare tires on the roof. Mebetoys Innocenti Mini (Italian-made mini) appeared in several different guises – including with skis and sled on its roof rack. Other models were unique because they were not offered elsewhere, like the ISO Fidia S4 grand touring sedan. Politoys had the Rivolta and Corgi and Matchbox made the Grifo ubiquitous, but nobody else made the Fidia S4. Models such as the Lamborghini Urraco, Maserati Bora, Toyota 2000 GT, and Ferrari 365 GTC-4 were also special and not often seen in 1:43 scale. Corgi Toys made the Bora, but the Mebetoys version was much better proportioned, detailed and painted.

Sinclair's Auto Miniatures, largely responsible for bringing the diecast collector hobby to the United States, discussed that many people were not aware that Mebetoys also made a few promotional issue diecast cars. In the 1960s the company issued a couple of 1:24 scale Alfa Romeos, referred to as the "le veterane" set. These two cars were a 1925 P2 World Champion Grand Prix car and a 1951 Alfetta racer. They had exquisite detail with rubber tires and were mounted on a wood base with a decorative identification plate and covered with a clear plastic display box. These were reissued in the late 1970s.

The original Mebetoys logo was an 'opening eye' that looks very similar to the American CBS TV logo. Packaging was often a wood grain beige style with a plastic window – always including the 'eye' logo. Some boxes were other colors like a bright yellow. Then Mattel took over and the Mattel red pointed circle was added alongside the Mebetoys logo.

== Changes by Mattel ==
In 1969, Mebetoys was bought by Mattel, which carried on Mebetoys models and began to market new 1/43 scale cars. At first, these were the same realistic Mebetoys European models and had many opening features, rubber tires, and excellent detail.

=== Gran Toros and customs ===
Incrementally, however, Mattel changed many aspects of Mebetoys. Hard plastic 'speed' tires replaced rubber and new California custom body designs were introduced in 1:43 scale and marketed as Hot Wheels Gran Toros, though they still said Mebetoys on the base. Thus the marque became less 'European' with more Mattel influence.

In order to attract buyers in the U.S. market, models like the realistic Toyota 2000 GT were augmented with ones such as Tom Daniel's fantasy custom Twin Mill (a model still used in the standard Hot Wheels line). The Hot Wheels flames-off-the-wheel emblem was applied to some Mebetoys packaging. "Hot Wheels" was translated into Italian as "Sputafuoco", or literally, the cars that "spit fire". Thus Mebetoys were marketed as a sort of larger Hot Wheels range. In an interesting twist Mattel's 'Flying Colors' normal sized smaller Hot Wheels were offered in Italy in Italian Mebetoys boxes in the late 1970s. The 1:43 scale line was discontinued entirely around 1983.

=== Larger sizes ===
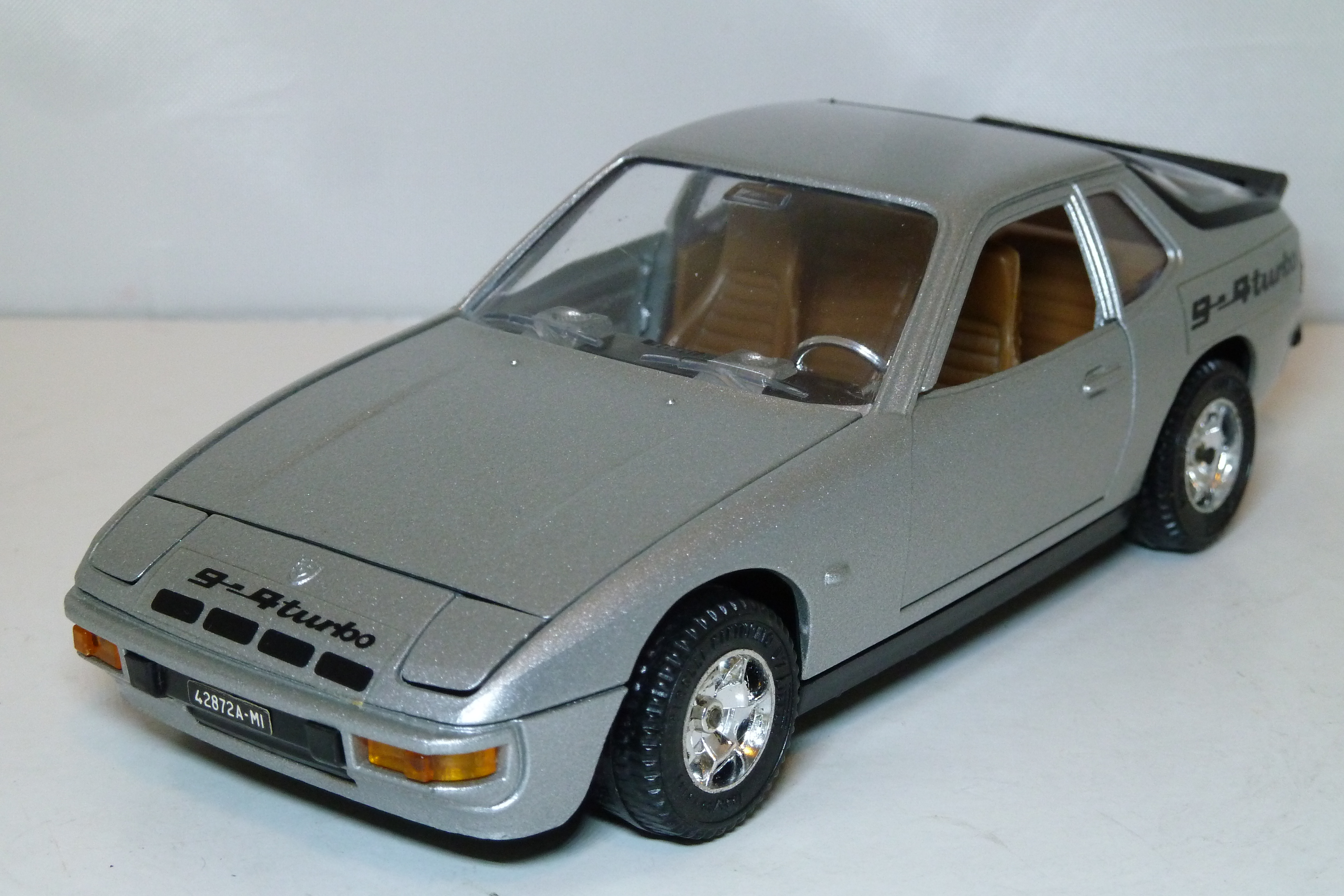
Mebetoys car in larger 1:24 scale

Mebetoys under Mattel also made a 1:24 scale line which included a BMW 323 coupe, Porsche 924, Porsche 928, Ford Fiesta, Citroen Dyane (one with Zodiac style rubber boat!), Citroen Visa sedan, Alfa Romeo Alfetta (one in Carabinieri livery), Alfa Alfasud Sprint, Alfa Giulietta sedan, FIAT Uno sedan, Volkswagen Beetle, Volkswagen Golf sedan, Talbot Horizon sedan / Simca 1308 sedan, Mercedes-Benz 450 SEL sedan, Opel Kadett, a Land Rover (one outfitted for desert photography), and a Lancia Beta coupe – one variation of which came handsomely equipped with bicycle rack and two bikes. These were well detailed, but for comparison of 'family' brands, the paint was done better on the later 1:24 scale Besana brothers Martoys. A few 1:30 scale trucks and vans were also made, like the FIAT 242 Attrez-Raid Rally Van.

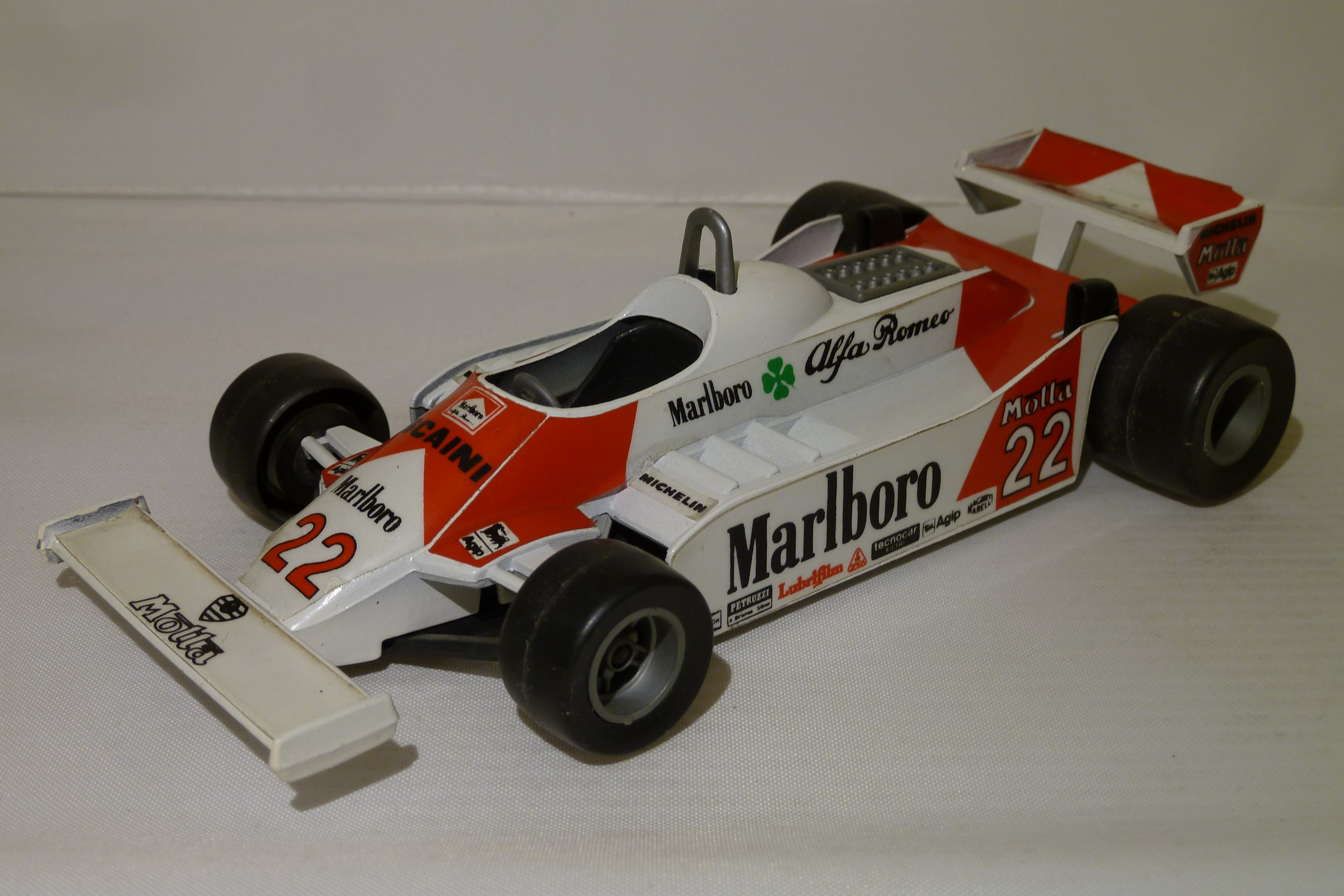
F-1 car

Why so many of the 1:24 scale vehicles were rather mundane sedans is an interesting question since manufacturers often make sportier cars for play. Whether any of these were used for promotional purposes is unknown. Some of the later cars (and some of the last made by Mebetoys) had rather fat plastic tires and unwieldy wheel designs.

Some of the cars seemed spot on in detail and proportions like the Porsche 924 and the Volkswagens. Others were less confident in their realism. The Porsche 924 had nearly perfect proportion and the details were exquisite. The wheel design was generic but detailed and attractive with five larger and five smaller slots. Everything opened, including the rear plastic hatch. Even the hidden headlights popped up by moving a lever at the front of the chassis. When fully opened, however, the headlight lever stuck out from under the front bumper like some kind of strange antenna. The seats tilted forward, but chrome plating the steering wheel and gear shift was not so realistic. Another negative was that though the doors opened they did not include the door frame window surround.

== Diecast legacy ==
After selling the brand to Mattel, the Besana brothers set up Martoys. This firm made car models in 1/24-scale for only two years, from 1974 to 1976. Then, possibly because of confusion with Louis Marx and Company, the name was changed to Bburago, with two 'Bs' (the first B stood for the creator's name, Besana, while the remainder was for the town of Burago di Molgora where the models were made). Bburago became probably the most well-known and popular producer of 1:18 scale models through the 1980s and 1990s. Bburago's assets were sold in 2006 to Maisto.

== Regular series 1/43 models ==
The present list was compiled using Mebetoys catalogues and information from Besana Mebetoys website, The Gran Toros website and the book by Paolo Rampini.

=== Serie A (Europe) ===
Note: Gaps in the number sequence are for models that were never issued to our knowledge.

- A-1 Fiat 850
- A-2 Fiat 1500
- A-3 Alfa Romeo Giulia Berlina
- A-4 Alfa Romeo 2600 Berlina
- A-5 Autobianchi Primula
- A-6 Lancia Flavia Berlina
- A-7 Alfa Romeo Giulia Berlina Carabinieri
- A-7 Fiat 128 Berlina Carabinieri
- A-8 Alfa Romeo Giulia Police Berlina
- A-8 Fiat 128 Berlina Police Berlina
- A-9 Fiat 1100 R
- A-10 Maserati Mistral
- A-11 Lancia Fulvia Coupé
- A-12 912 Porsche
- A-13 Opel Kadett B Coupé
- A-14 Fiat Dino Coupe
- A-15 Fiat 1500 Police de la circulation
- A-15 Fiat 128 Police de la circulation
- A-16 Fiat 124 Saloon - 124 Berlina spécial
- A-17 BMW 2000 CS
- A-18 Alfa Romeo Spider
- A-19 Mercedes Benz 250 SE Coupé
- A-20 Lamborghini Miura
- A-21 Fiat 1500 Service des incendies
- A-21 Fiat 128 pompiers
- A-22 Chevrolet Corvette Rondine
- A-23 Chaparral 2F
- A-24 Ford GT 40 MkII
- A-25 Porsche 906 Carrera
- A-26 Rolls Royce Silver Shadow
- A-27 Ferrari 330 P4
- A-28 Innocenti Mini
- A-29 Toyota 2000 GT
- A-30 Iso Rivolta S4
- A-31 Innocenti Mini Rallye
- A-32 Lancia Fulvia HF Coupe Rallye
- A-33 912 Porsche Rallye
- A-34 Opel Kadett B Coupé Rallye
- A-35 Auto Yogi et Boo Boo
- A-36 Nouveau Fiat 500
- A-37 NSU Ro 80
- A-38 530 Matra Vignale
- A-39 Lotus Europa
- A-40 Land Rover Trans America Tour
- A-41 124 Fiat Raid spécial
- A-42 Land Rover Croix-Rouge
- A-43 Fiat 124 Taxi spécial - Fiat 128 Taxi
- A-44 Runabout Bertone
- A-45 Alfa Romeo Iguana
- A-46 Alfa Romeo GT Zagato junior
- A-47 Lamborghini Urraco
- A-48 Autobianchi A112
- A-49 Lancia Stratos Prototype
- A-50 Ferrari 365 GTC / 4
- A-51 Porsche 912 Rallye Londres Sydney
- A-52 Fiat Dino Coupé Week End
- A-53 Ford Escort MkI
- A-54 127 Fiat
- A-55 Ford Escort Mexique Rallye
- A-56 Ferrari 312PB
- A-57 Alfa Romeo Alfasud
- A-58 Autobianchi A112 Abarth
- A-59 Fiat 128 Sedan
- A-60 Fiat 128 Rallye
- A-61 Morris Mini Ski
- A-62 126 Fiat
- A-63 BMW 2800 Alpina 63 Rallye
- A-64 912 Porsche Ski
- A-65 Alfa Romeo Spider Tour d'Italie
- A-66 Autobianchi Primula Petroleum Research
- A-67 Land Rover militaire
- A-68 127 Fiat Rallye
- A-69 Renault 5
- A-70 Volkswagen 1303
- A-71 Innocenti Mini Hippie
- A-72 Maserati Bora
- A-73 Lancia Fulvia HF Marlboro Rallye
- A-74 Land Rover Pompieri
- A-75 Ziguli Fiat 124-124 Ziguli spécial
- A-76 Alfa Romeo Alfetta Berlina
- A-77 Fiat 128 Coupé
- A-78 Porsche 911 Rallye
- A-79 Jeep militaire
- A-80 Jeep civile
- A-81 Jeep pompiers
- A-82 Alfa Romeo Alfetta Carabinieri
- A-83 Alfa Romeo Alfetta Police
- A-84 Citroen Dyane
- A-85 131 Fiat Mirafiori
- A-86 Innocenti Mini 90
- A-87 Volkswagen Golf MkI
- A-88 1303 Volkswagen jeans
- A-89 Jeep Sécurité publique
- A-90 Alfa Romeo Alfasud Ti Rallye Bandama
- A-91 Lancia Fulvia HF Coupe Alitalia
- A-92 Alfa Romeo Alfetta Département
- A-93 Porsche 924
- A-94 Renault 5 Rallye
- A-95 Jeep Carabinieri
- A-96 Jeep des Nations Unies
- A-97 Alfa Romeo Alfasud Trophy
- A-98 131 Fiat Rallye
- A-99 Citroen Dyane Sea
- A-100 512 Ferrari
- A-101 Porsche 917
- A-102 De Tomaso
- A-103 320 BMW E21
- A-105 Alfa Romeo Sprint
- A-106 Ford Fiesta MkI
- A-107 Simca 1307
- A-108 Mini De Tomaso
- A 109-Citroen Dyane Rallycross
- A-110 Fiat 131 Alitalia
- A-111 Alfa Romeo Giulietta
- A-112 Fiat 126 Personal
- A-113 BMW 320 Rallye
- A-114 Volkswagen Golf ADAC
- A-115 Volkswagen Golf Polizei
- A-117 Alfa Romeo Alfasud Ti Vacanze Mare
- A-118 Audi 100
- A-119 Fiat Ritmo
- A-120 BMW 733 E23
- A-121 Ford Granada
- A-122 Jeep Desert Cross
- A-123 Talbot Matra Rancho
- A-124 Opel Monza
- A-125 Fiat Panda 30
- A-126 Volkswagen Golf Rallye
- A-127 Ford Fiesta Rallye
- A-128 Simca 1307 Rallye
- A-129 Simca Horizon
- A-130 Volvo 343
- A-131 Fiat Abarth 131 Rallye
- A-132 Volkswagen Golf Week End
- A-133 Peugeot 305
- A-134 Citroen Visa
- A-135 Alfa Romeo Giulietta Carabinieri
- A-136 Alfa Romeo Giulietta Police
- A-138 Alfa Romeo Giulietta Rallye
- A-139 Fiat Ritmo Rallye
- A-140 Audi 100 GLS “POLlZEl"
- A-141 Audi 100 GLS “ADAC"
- A-142 Simca Horizon Rallye
- A-143 Opel Monza Rallye
- A-145 Ford Granada Rallye
- A-146 B.M.W. 730 Stunt Car
- A-147 Lancia Delta
- A-149 Jeep Willys Assistenza
- A-150 Fiat Ritmo Week End
- A-152 Fiat Abarth 131 Rallye
- A-156 Opel Kadett D
- A-157 Renault 5 Rally
- A-159 Fiat Ritmo Rallye
- A-160 Alfa Romeo Giulietta Rally
- A-161 Porsche 924 Esso Racing
- A-162 Volvo 343 Esso Racing
- A-164 Ford Granada Stunt Car
- A-165 Lancia Delta Rally
- A-166 Fiat Panda Abarth Rally
- A-167 Lancia Delta Racing
- A-168 Porsche 924 Rally
- A-169 Opel Kadett con windsurf
- A-170 Volvo 343 Rally
- A-171 Jeep Willys Renegade
- A-172 Lancia Delta con windsurf
- A-173 Peugeot 305 con sci
- A-174 Citroën Visa Raid
