= Mercury (toy manufacturer) =

Italian scale model cars manufacturer

- Founded: 1932
- Founder: Attilio Clemente; Antonio Cravero
- Defunct: 1978; 48 years ago
- Headquarters: Turin, Italy
- Products: Die-cast scale model cars

Mercury was an Italian manufacturing company of die-cast scale model cars. Based in Turin, Mercury was active from 1932 until 1980. Along with Dinky Toys in England, Mercury was a pioneer in 1:43 scale diecast toys made in Europe. Today, Mercury models are rather rare and not easy to find. The company logo was the word Mercury within a rectangle with a round toothed gear behind the company name.

== History ==
As with many toy car makers, Turin-based Mercury started as a diecaster of small parts. It produced metal parts mainly for auto companies. Later an importer for German Märklin, the company was started in 1932, by Attilio Clemente and Antonio Cravero, but its first toy was a gun produced about 1939. The company first began making toy cars just after World War II, so is one of the earliest diecast model makers preceding Corgi and many others and it was the earliest producer in Italy. In Italy there was little competition for Mercury through most of the 1950s.

Early cars were more Tootsietoy-like with simple cast bodies, wheels and no interiors. Later, in competition with Corgi and Dinky, Mercury added interior details and opening features to remain competitive. Early cars, like an 'Aero' coupe (which looked kind of like a Lancia Aprilia coupe) and 'race car' were generic and not based on real cars and early sizes hovered around 1:40 scale. The Aero was first a promotional for an Italian radio manufacturer named SAFAR, but almost immediately produced in its own right.

The company often took photos of cars at the Pininfarina and nearby Fiat factories where Mercury was located in the same industrial zone Among the first 'real' cars Mercury made were the 1949 Fiat 500C Topolino and the 1950 Fiat 1400 sedan

== Models ==
Mercury made more than 100 different models in its distinguished history. Italian sedans and sports cars were often the subject of Mercury and most were in 1:43 scale. In fact, Mercury's competition with the fine Politoys M series in the 1960s was simply called "Mercury 1:43". Some British, American and German cars were offered, but also similar to Politoys M series, Italian Ferraris, Alfa Romeos, FIATs and Maseratis were common offerings. American cars seen were a Cadillac Eldorado, Lincoln Continental convertible, Studebaker Commander, a two-tone Studebaker Golden Hawk, and, later, a racing Chevrolet-powered Chaparral Prototipo 2F. The tiny Autobianchi Bianchina was unique, as was the 1957 Alfa Giuletta, or the Porsche 908 Nürburgring.

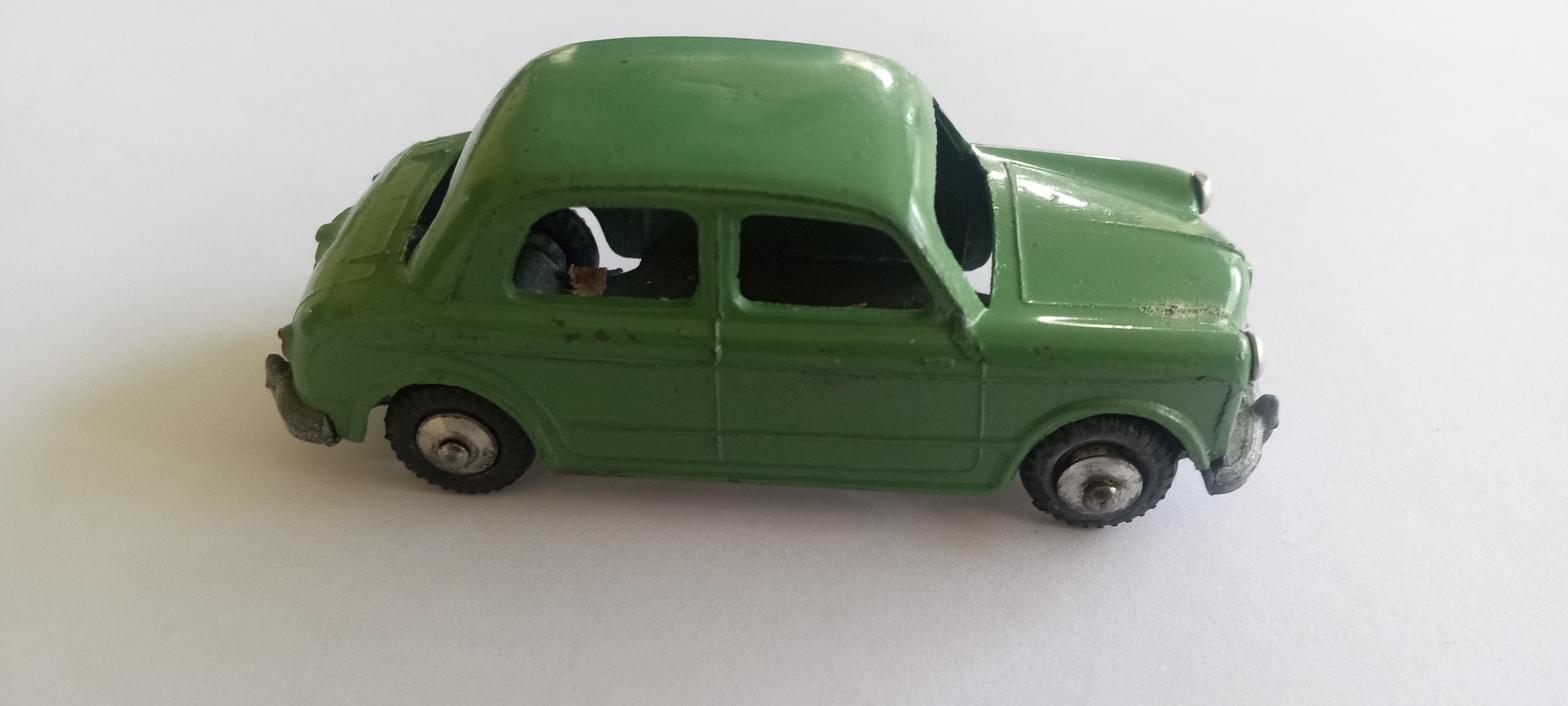
1954 Mercury Fiat Nuova 1100, 1/48 scale

Mercury's first series of cars were mostly in the unusual 1:40 scale. Then, in the 1950's they standardized on the slightly smaller 1:48, which was similar to British Dinky Toys. Gradually windows and interiors were added. In 1962, they suddenly took the industry by storm with a Fiat 2300S coupe that had opening hood (bonnet) revealing a detailed engine, opening doors and opening trunk (boot). To have all these opening features in one car of this size appears to be an industry first, predating the rather similar Corgi Ghia L6.4. The model also featured glass headlights and a relatively detailed diecast base that could be unscrewed. The Fiat 2300S was also the first of the Mercury range in the scale of 1/43 which was becoming something of an industry standard. Mercury followed with a series of finely modeled cars with opening features, with particular emphasis on Ferrari and other sports and racing cars.

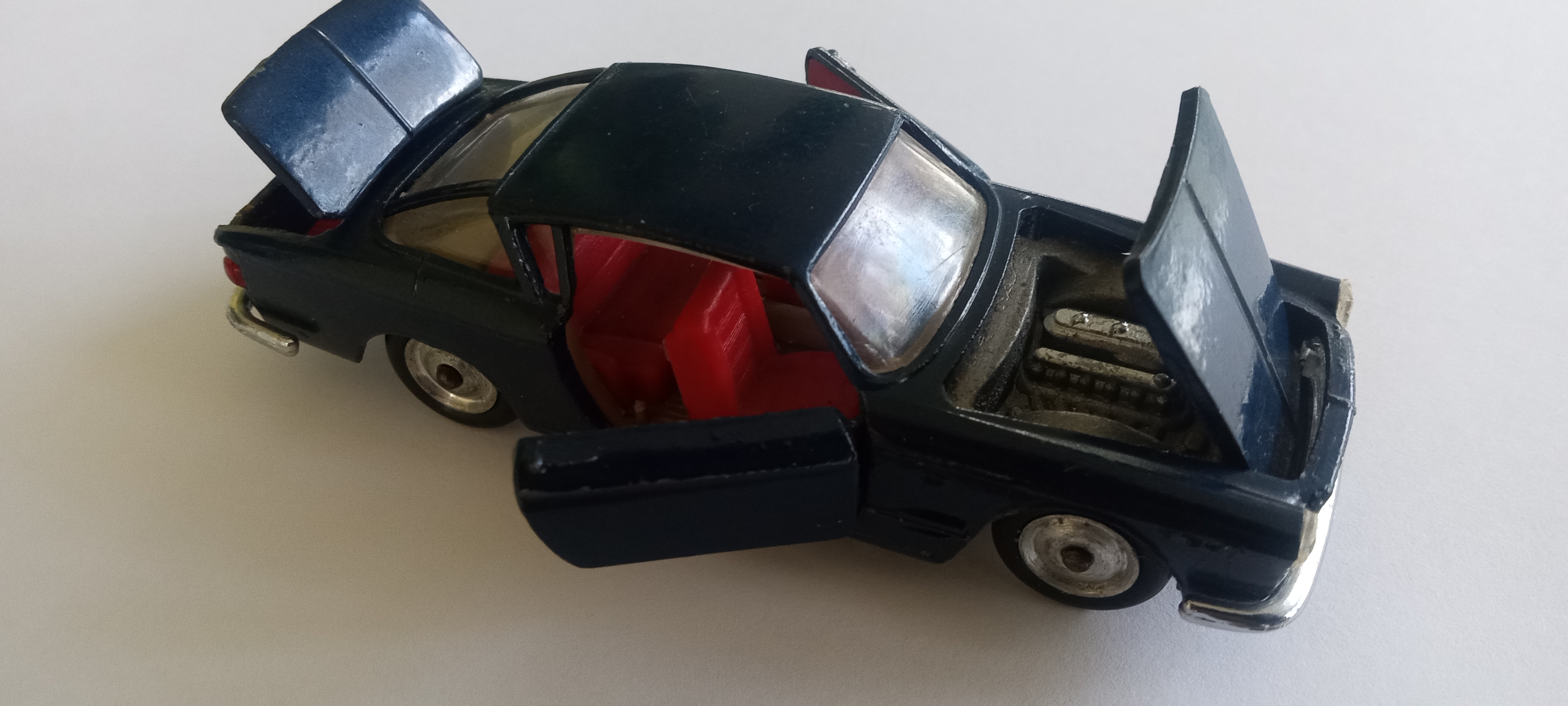
1962 Mercury Fiat 2300S, a trend-setter in the diecast model car industry

However, in 1965 Italian rivals Politoys who had previously specialized in plastic (and fiberglass) cars, brought out their "M" series of diecast cars. This was followed shortly by Mebetoys and the short-lived Edil; all these making diecast models in 1/43 scale. Many of the companies made the same model - for instance, the Mercury Alfa Romeo Giulia of 1966 soon had competition from very similar offerings from Politoys, Mebetoys, Edil and French Dinky (who had an overlap of distribution area). It was not surprising that not all the Italian diecast companies could survive.

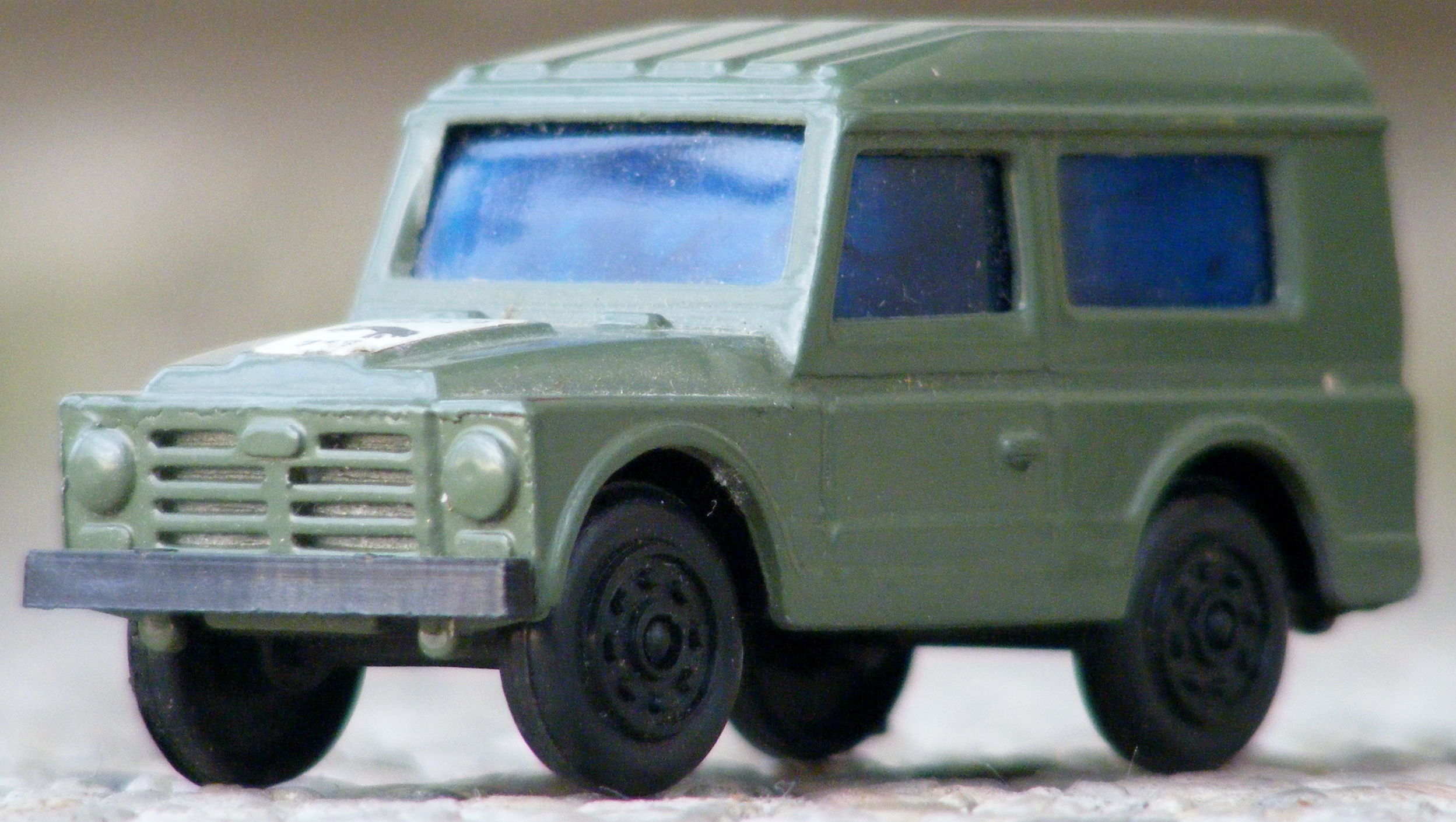
Later smaller scale Mercury Modelauto Fiat Campagnola army truck - reminiscent of a Land Rover

Cars were the mainstay of the company but some commercial vehicles were available like the earlier Autocarro Ciclope, a long Saurer moving van with opening rear doors and a Viberti tanker truck. These were offered in a variety of colorful liveries like A Welti Furrier AG for the Saurer van and the use of the attractive Agip logo for the tanker.

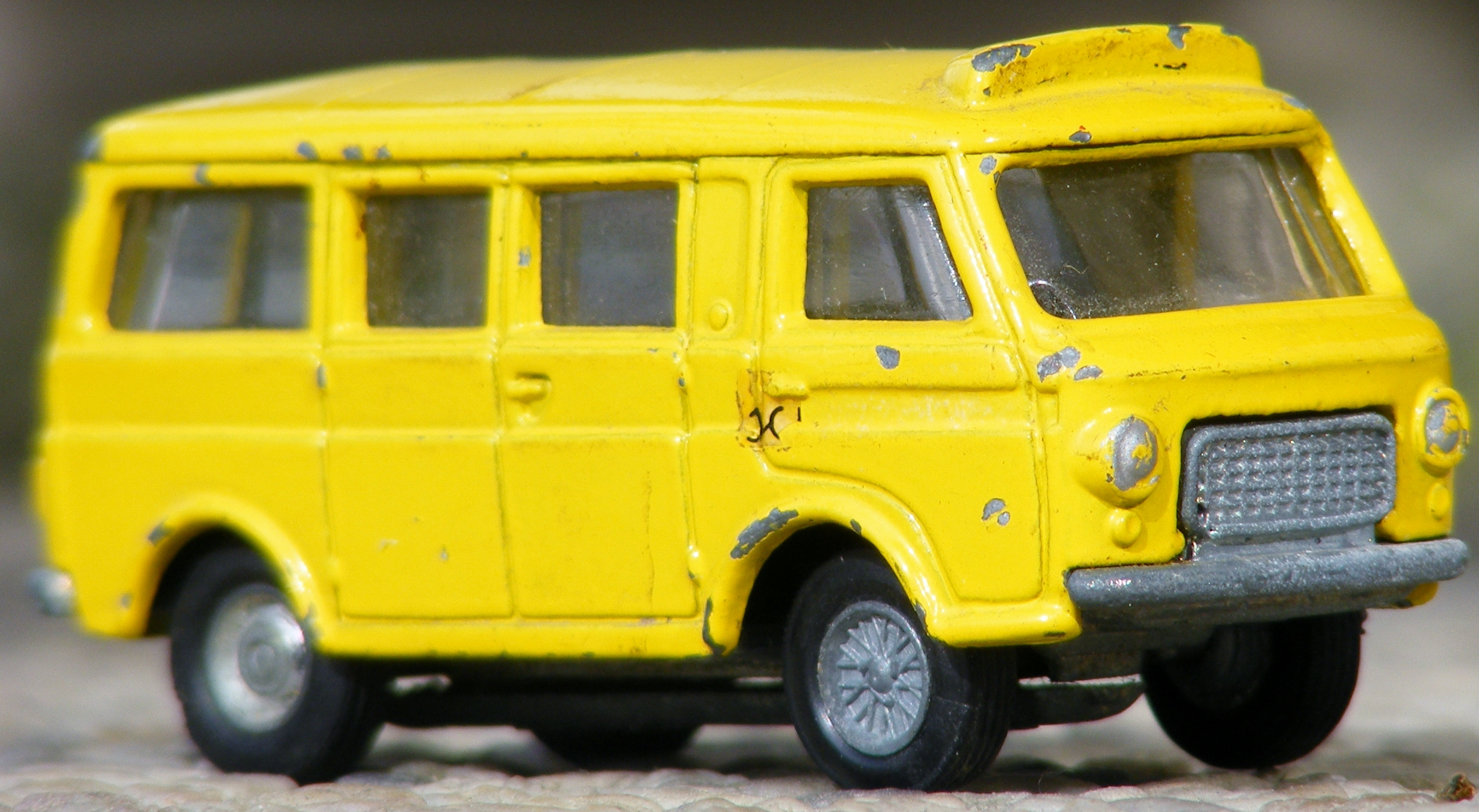
A Mercury Speedy (Matchbox sized) Fiat 248 van

In Italy Mercury had the diecast toy field to itself until 1960 when Politoys first started with its own plastic vehicles. Between 1959 and 1964, Mercury moved toward 1:43 scale for models, leaving behind the larger 1:40. Models often had interesting choices of livery and racing detail. For example, the Ferrari 330P Monza open cockpit race car was offered in several colors including a Silverstone green with British flags, but also in yellow and the standard prancing horse red. The Ital Design Manta was another model not often seen in miniature. Sometimes doors and hoods did not match well to bodies, like on the Alfa Carabo Bertone's gull-wing doors, or the body shape of the Mercedes C-111 rotary, but the attempt was honorable and often the features were distinct compared to those seen in Politoys or Mebetoys. The Alfa Romeo Montreal Bertone was cast nicely, but perhaps not as well as the Politoys M version while the Spanish Pilen C-111 was done with better proportions than the Mercury.

Besides luxury cars such as Ferraris, Maseratis and Alfas, non-luxury vehicles such as Fiat 600s, 1100 sedans, 850 standard and Bertone 128 coupes and sedans, and 124 sedans were offered, Alfettas and Lancia sedans were also produced. Mercury also produced scooters like the APE with delivery box, Lambretta delivery and solo scooter and the Vespa. Construction and farm vehicles were also offered.

Some of the newer models seemed to be attempts to compete with Hot Wheels. The well-done 1930s Fiat Balilla roadster, for example was later hot-rodded with a V-8 engine, brash exhaust pipes and a roll cage.

== The Chaparral 2F ==
An up close examination of the Chaparral 2F (Mercury #30), produced about 1970, is a good example of the company's ingenuity. The rear wing (which along with its struts was diecast metal) moved up and down and also tilted. The gull-wing doors were molded in clear plastic with lower portions painted white like the body. Rear mesh covering the engine and lined vents added realism. Sometimes Mercury models went above and beyond the norm. On the Chaparral, this was seen in minutae like tiny dual diecast metal gas caps which opened. Decals were fairly precise and historically accurate including sponsorship by Shell and toy model manufacturer Cox - labeled on the sides. The steering wheel was a couple of sizes too big, but other features made up for that. The front headlight were cast not in clear plastic, but in a yellowish tint. The exhaust tips exited the rear molded into a separate metal plate - the tips were also machined to look hollow. Also, Chaparral creator Jim Hall was from Texas and the Mercury version has yellow Texas plates. Having stated many positives, this model, produced about 1970, was not perfect in proportion. The rear quarters look a bit too thick and square and the gentle curve of the doors up to the engine lid vents is lost on this model. Also, those vents on the real car are molded to look like two separate intakes while it is a single intake on each side of the model. The front grille on the Mercury is just an elongated rectangle while the real car's was oval-ish.

== Smaller series ==
In 1949 Mercury introduced a smaller sized series of vehicles called 'MicroMercury' in about 1:80 scale. This series was fairly short-lived. These were focused on HO railway modeling and sold along with some train and wagon models that today are quite rare.

Later, Mercury's smaller 'Matchbox' sized cars were the Speedy series. These were made to compete more with Mattel's Hot Wheels (and with Matchbox), though the line consisted of mainly Italian or European models. There were about twenty cars in the series. Notable were OSI Silver Fox, Sigma Grand Prix car, and an Alfa Romeo Montreal which is rarely seen by any manufacturer in this smaller size. The Ford GT40 was one of the more popular and easier-to-find in the Speedy series.

Earlier Speedy models from the later 1960s had rubber tires which is rare in smaller scale diecast cars. About 1970, the "Hot Wheels" syndrome caused low friction plastic wheels to be added and the name of the line was altered to "Speedy Velox".

== Motorcycles ==
Another series, similar to Politoys offerings, was the 1:24 scale series of motorcycles. One offered was the 1971 Kawasaki 750 Mach IV. Some of Mercury's earlier motorcycle offering were produced secondhand by Dalia, and, later, Guiloy, of Spain.

== Marketing and packaging ==
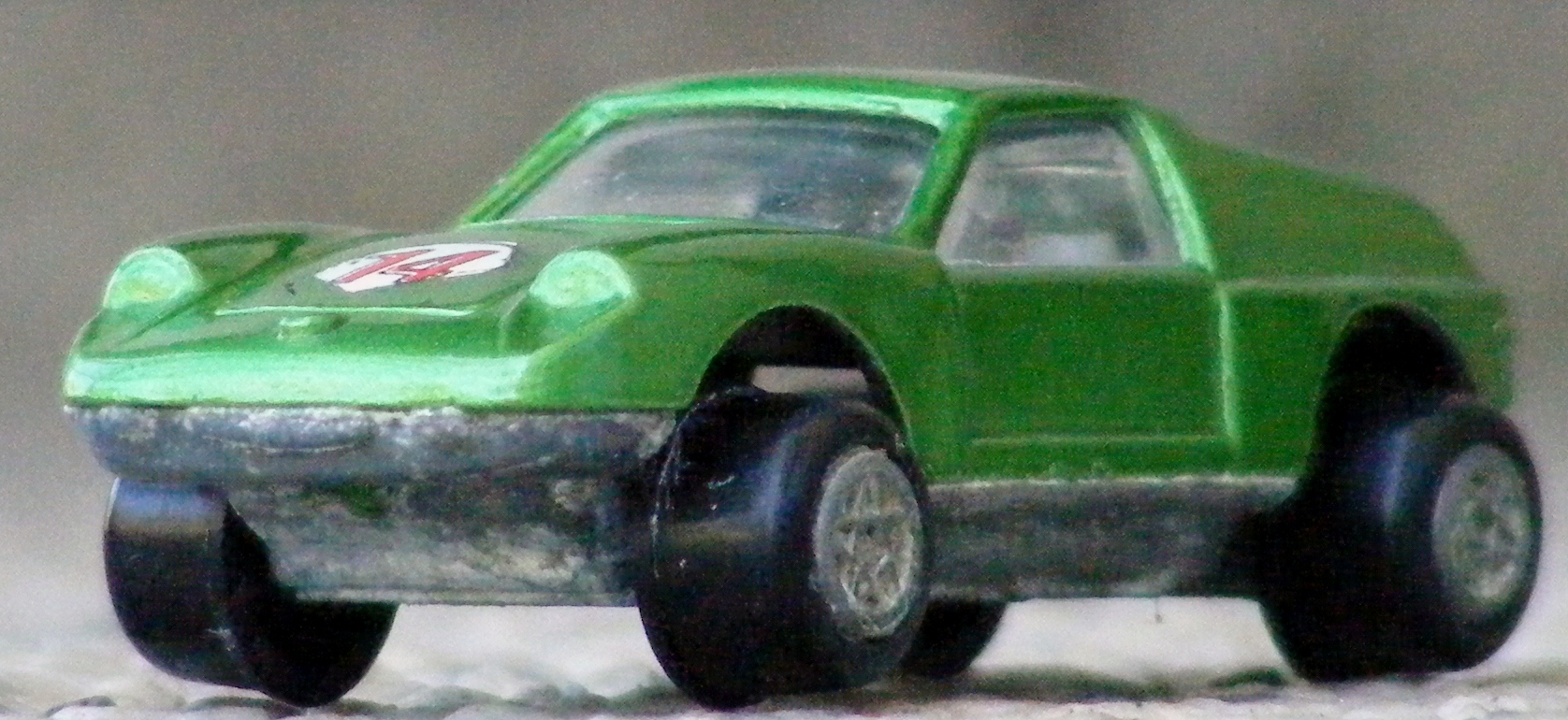
Speedy series Lotus Europa. For a time this series was called 'Speedy Velox'. As seen by the odd proportions of the Europa in this picture, this series was not nearly as good as Matchbox or Siku

Most boxes, up to the 1970s anyway, portrayed nicely done artwork (often more expensive for the companies since artists need to be contracted), though some early boxes were plain white with the Mercury logo only. Early boxes were commonly blue with simple artwork showing the car only. Later boxes were often red with model details on the red sides and then painted art scenes with the car on alternate panels. Some boxes were light blue, some a darker blue. The illustrator for Mercury was Mario Davazza. Into the 1970s later boxes were red with windows. These no longer had illustrations.

Several models were introduced as promotional giveaways for other companies like the first 'Aero' coupe for SAFAR or, later, the FIAT 850 intended for the real car's introduction.

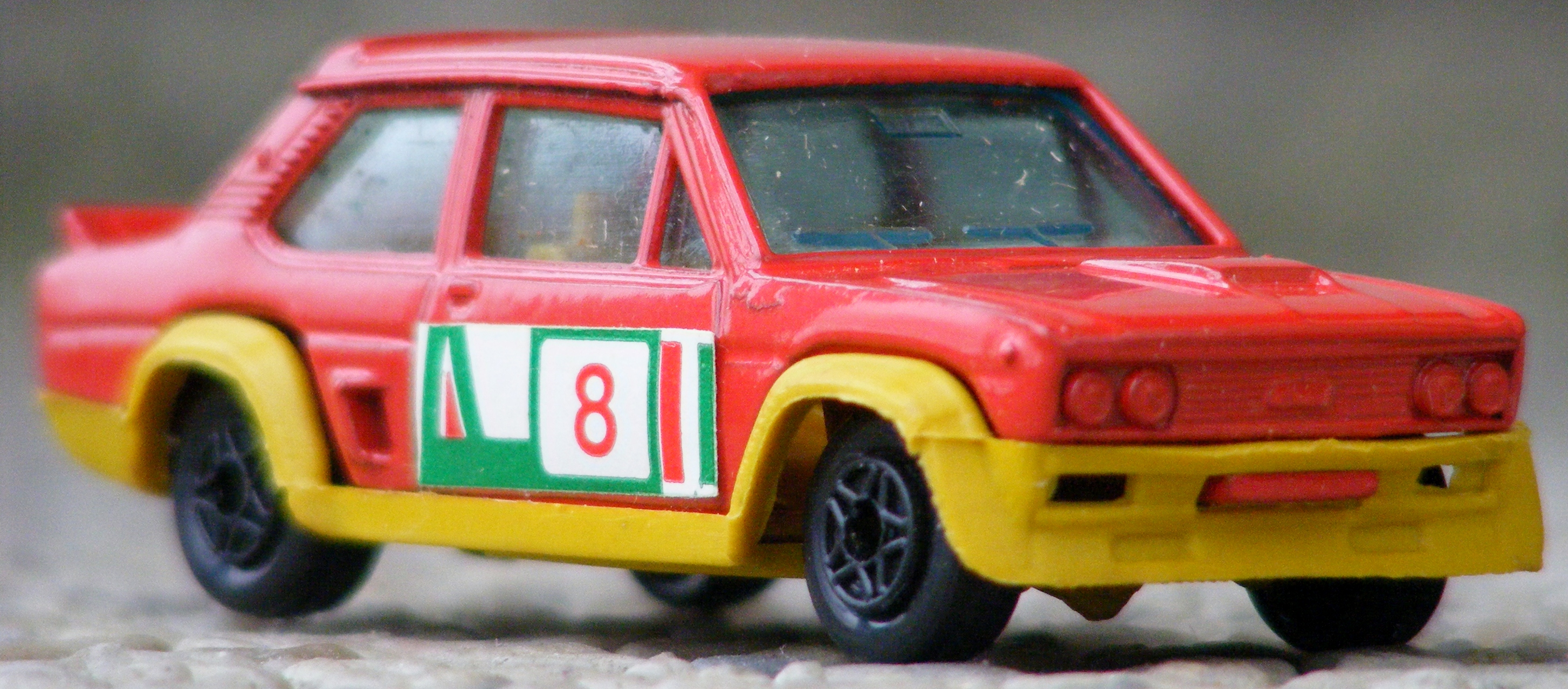
A later Mercury Fiat 131 Abarth. Earlier 1:43 scale cars were much more realistic

Mercury was a Marklin importer in the 1930s and this connection was continued or renewed through the 1970s when both lines could be found in some catalogues. While the motorcycles were also later offered by Dalia and Guiloy, some Mercury models were also used by Pilen and Joal.

Mercury was known for many different color combinations for its models whereas a company like Corgi may have had only two at the most. For example, the 1:43 scale Fiat 600 Multipla was issued in at least 13 different two-tone combinations.

The company also made several gift sets, like the "Squadra Corse Ferrari" set with a 250LM and four different colored 330P roadsters. The set came with several replacement wheels for the Ferraris.

== The end ==
With increased costs and the competition of Politoys, Mebetoys, and other mass producers of diecast toys in Europe, Mercury had more and more difficulty keeping up. Through the 1970s, fewer and fewer cars were produced. The last model was the Fiat Ritmo and the company closed its doors in 1978.
