= Franklin Mint Precision Models =

Franklin Mint Precision Models were made by the Franklin Mint, originally a private mint founded by Joseph Segel in 1964 in Wawa, Pennsylvania. The company is now owned by a private equity firm headquartered in Midtown Manhattan New York City and Exton, Pennsylvania. Besides diecast automobiles, the Franklin Mint manufactured and marketed coins, jewelry, dolls, sculpture and other collectibles.

== History ==
In 1983, after Warner Communications had purchased the Franklin Mint, the company entered the die-cast vehicle market introducing a 1935 Mercedes Benz 500K Roadster. In the following years, Franklin Mint produced more than 600 different issues of motorcycles, trucks and tractors besides automobiles. Marketing of all vehicles was almost exclusively through mail order catalogs.

Vehicles - often called 'Franklin Mint Precision Models' - usually cost between $75 and $150 and were meant as adult collectibles. Over time, models were often made available in several different paint schemes. Models were made in China, usually in batches of between 1,000 and 5,000 pieces. The normal scale produced was 1:24, but models were also issued in 1:43, 1:18 and even a very large 1:8 for the 1885 Daimler (Single Track) Reitwagen and the 1885/1886 Benz Patent-Motorwagen.

== Model Details ==
Collectible authors such as Randall Olson and Dana Johnson recognized Franklin Mint as one of the first commercial companies to sell diecast vehicles aimed at collectors. Models ranged from post-war selections such as the 1948 Tucker or the 1961 Ford Country Squire wagon with realistic rendering of vinyl wood siding, to newer model choices such as a complete and detailed 1975 Corvette.

Franklin's execution, however, was not always the best. In the 1980s and 1990s, car and trucks were well proportioned and had interesting features, but models were a bit too heavy on details that could have been rendered more delicately or accurately. Chrome spears along the sides of 1950s cars, for example, were sometimes too thick and unrealistically embedded in grooves in the die-cast body. At times, door panels did not line up well or seemed slightly bloated as seen in the Checker taxi. The body shape is not bad, but appears slightly 'inflated'.

One website reviews Franklin Mint vehicles and points out that though the lines of the 1:24 scale 1948 Tucker were "clean and precise" the model suffered from unrealistically thick hinges, window plastic 'glass' correctly detailed in some places but not in others, and a misplaced steering wheel and other problems with interior rendering. Hemmings Motor News reported that the Franklin rendition of the Mercedes 300SL had accurate interior upholstery and nicely fitting gulling doors, but color details that were wrong, parts badly placed, and a misshapen windshield.

At the time Franklin Mint manufactured and sold their die-cast vehicle models (primarily the 1980s and 1990s), other companies including Anson, Bburago, Mira and Maisto offered detailed models at lower prices. One published collector even wrote that he would recommend Minichamps or Schuco before Franklin Mint.

== The Nash Metropolitan ==
One good Franklin Mint example was the Nash Metropolitan. In particular, the model's proportions were precise and the engine was painted an authentic green and nicely detailed like the real Metropolitan English Austin engine which was made in England. Still, one Nash enthusiast noted that though satisfied with the overall presentation, the model wasn't the proper color, lacked proper grille detail, and other paint details were inaccurate. To Franklin Mint's credit, however, buyers were later offered a corrected model. Johnson reports on other followers who kept Franklin Mint informed on inaccuracies throughout their offerings - and it was honorable that the mint would try to make corrections.

Other examples of interest were the detailed Harley-Davidson Heritage Softail motorcycle in 1:10 scale which included accurate looking texture on the saddlebags, moving gearshift and brake pedals (which were diecast metal), and realistic labeling on the bike's crankcase. One odd offering was Richard Petty's 1977 number 43 NASCAR Oldsmobile Cutlass stock car, which featured half the body in clear plastic so as to view inner details. Hopefully, the clear plastic will hold up over time and not become discolored. A vehicle of a different stripe was the 1868 Wells Fargo stagecoach with authentic removable roof trunks and other equipment, that was available in commemorative John Wayne decor.

Around 2000, Franklin Mint curtailed much of its diecast line with most models going out of production. Very few new vehicles were developed through 2009. Currently, Franklin Mint sells models assembled by several firms notable for their quality and precision, like CMC, GMP or Exoto.
