= Edil =

Edil is a given name meaning "Great power and ruler to all". The name appears both in Nordic and Islamic cultures. In Islam, it is a variant of the more prominent name Adeel. Notable people with the name include:

- Edil Baisalov (born 1977), Kyrgyz politician and activist
- Edil Rosenqvist (1892–1973), Finnish wrestler
