= Autofest City =

Autofest City is India's largest collection of authentic scale models founded by brothers Clyde and Neil D'Costa. The collection has authentic replicas spanning over 500 years of transportation history, with special emphasis on automobiles.

Autofest City has replicas of historically important automobiles from leading marques like Ferrari, BMW, Mercedes-Benz, Lamborghini, Porsche, Jaguar and Volkswagen.

Located in Mysore and housed in two exclusive buildings with a total display floor space of 1800 sq. ft., Autofest City has earned international acclaim for its unique displays which provide pictorial and written information about the model on display.

== The early years ==
The collection began with two Scale 40 models by Maisto bought at a store in Mysore in early 1996 and today has over 1,800 replicas of historically important automobiles.

Adding value to the scale 40 & 43 models on display is diorama–petrol pumps, car washes, dealership buildings and theme parks, a truck stop, railway station, church, police station, construction site, club-house and business park.

== Unique Displays ==
Autofest City is a collection of interesting and informative displays of scale models. Within each display are technical details of the real automobile with a list of highlights, detailed photographs of the real automobile, printed logos, a photograph of the automobile company's founder (where applicable), a miniature flag of the country of origin and any other piece of information to enhance the value of the model on display.

== Autofest City's Firsts ==
The collection has authentic replicas of the world's first combustion engined automobiles, airplane and steam-engines.

Scale 8, 1885 Daimler Reitwagen (the world's first internal combustion motorcycle)

Scale 16, 1886 Daimler Motorcarriage (the world's 1st 4-wheeled automobile)

Scale 8, 1886 Benz Patent Motorwagen (the world's 1st 3-wheeled automobile)

Scale8, 1893 Duryea Power Wagon (America's 1st 4-wheeled car, which participated in and won the 1st automobile race in the world)

Scale 6, 1896 Ford Quadricycle (Henry Ford's first car)

Scale 21, 1903 Wright Flyer One

Scale 26, 1829 Stevenson's Locomotive, the world's first practical steam engine

Scale 38, 1804 Trevithick's locomotive.

== Autofest City's Series ==
Autofest City has its own exclusive series - The Decade Series, The Value Addition Series, The Nostalgic Cinema Series and the Car Of The (20th) Century Series.

The Decade Series (20th Century) features at least one outstanding automobile from every decade in the 20th century, culminating with Motoring Around The World, featuring three outstanding automobiles from three major automobile manufacturing continents.

The Nostalgic Cinema Series features automobiles either owned or used by film celebrities or used in motion pictures.

The Value Addition Series primarily features automobiles which have been customized by the brothers. The workshop scene displays too are a part of this series.

Autofest City is the only collection of scale models in the world with authentic replicas of the final 100 nominees of the Car Of The Century.

== Models from Kits / Partially Scratch-built ==
Autofest City has a few models assembled from intricate kits, which in many instances have called for the use of more resourceful skills over the standard assembly instructions.

The City also has customized scale models. Here are a few examples:

Scale 18, 1956 Chevrolet tow-truck from a basic pickup by Mira. Modifications include, adding extra forward illumination on bumper, roof-mounted beacons, crane on the rear deck, overhead rear-illumination and hot-rod style, side-mounted muffler.

Scale 18, 1957 Mercedes-Benz 300 SLS modified from a regular 300SL model by Bburago. Modifications include removal of bumpers, stock windshield, filling up of corresponding holes in the body and re-spraying, fabrication of an aeroscreen, tonneau cover over passenger's seat, roll-over bar aft of driver's seat and chrome detailing on headlamps.

Scale 16, 1930 Lincoln Towncar from an R Dietreich dual-phaeton body kit. Modifications include extending the length of the front door, re-hinging of rear door - 'suicide-style', fabrication of separator window and frame, fabrication of short top covering only passenger area, special two-tone town-car paint job.

Scale 24, 1934 Rolls-Royce Phantom II Towncar from standard open top kit by Minicraft Models. Modifications made to this model are almost similar to those of the 1930 Lincoln Towncar.

Scale 24, Freightliner Tractor Trailer from wrecking truck kit by Minicraft Models.

Scale 24, 2000 Volkswagen Beetle by Bburago with dual body paintwork.

== Autofest City's Diorama ==
Autofest City is essentially a family's effort. The D'Costa women are also actively involved gracing many displays with art and diorama.

Camping site : With a Scale 18, 1957 Cadillac Brougham and a 1957 Airstream Trailer, the other accessories are either bought out or hand-crafted by the D'Costa family for this display.

== Recognition ==
Autofest City was first recognised by the Limca Book of Records, a Coca-Cola Company publication in India, in its 2006 edition. Since 2007 the collection was listed among noteworthy museums across the country. In 2009, the collection is declared the largest in the country and conferred with a National Record.

The collection has been featured in a host of national magazines, national and regional newspapers, and on two television channels. Rotary Mysore, the city's premier service club published a special edition bulletin on the collection after Neil delivered an audio-visual presentation at their club meeting jointly conducted with the Inner Wheel Club of Mysore.

Autofest City has won its second national award recognition in the India Book of Records since 2010.

== Inspiration & Involvement ==
The collection has had visitors from all around the world. Everyone has been amazed by the presentation and the whole-hearted dedication of the D’Costa family that goes to make Autofest City remarkably unique. Many have drawn inspiration from Autofest City and started their own scale model collections.

Autofest City publishes a newsletter which informs its patrons, friends and well-wishers about various aspects of the collection, in addition to introducing new additions.

== Automobile Passion ==
The brothers’ love for automobiles goes much beyond their scale models–their earlier Contessa Classics, their Kinetic Honda scooters, their TATA Indigos and Indica were impeccably maintained. At the Customer Meet 2007 organized under the joint auspices of TATA Motors and Mysore's dealers M/s. Urs Kar Service Centre Pvt. Ltd., Neil was among the top ten TATA car owners of Mysore to be honoured.

== Sources ==
- Mhapralkar, Bhushan (2000). Auto India, Model Mania – The Factory Scales. Mumbai, India: Ashok H. Advani, Business India. p. 4. RNI No. 57128/93.
- Sorabjee, Hormazd (2000). Autocar India, Size Does Not Matter. New Delhi, India: Sorabjee Automotive Communications (P) Ltd. p. 17. RNI No. 71739/99 Vol.1 No.10.
- Stephen, David (November 27, 2000). "Auto Driven: Two brothers park coveted cars on the first floor of their farmhouse". India Today. Archived from the original on November 4, 2010.
- Vanali, Niranjan Dr. (2001). Sudha, Minicarugala Mahaloka. Bangalore, India: K. N. Harikumar. p. 2. CPMG/KA/BGE-183/2001 Vol.37 No.27.
- Rangaswamy, Basu Rtn. PHF (2001). Chamundi (Special Edition) Bulletin of Rotary Mysore, Autofest City – Celebrating Automobiles. Mysore, India: Rotary Mysore. p. 4.
- Mudalahundi, Shivakumar (2001). Udayavani, Karnataka Sampada, Car, Car, Car, Elnodi, Car. Bangalore, India: K. Gopalakrishna Bhat, Manipal Media Network Ltd. p. 1. KA/BGE/174/2001 Vol.9 No.291.
- Hussaini, S.K. (2001). Prajanudi, Car, Car, Car, Ilnodi, Car. Bangalore, India. p. 1&4.
- Christopher, Kavya (2002). Bangalore Times (The Times of India), Miniature Cars With Memories. Bangalore, India: Bennett Coleman & Co. Ltd. p. 5. CPMG/KA/BG-GPO-31/2003-05.
- Sudhir, R. Edwin (2002). Aspirations (The Economic Times – The Times of India Group) Collections. Mumbai, India: K. R. Ramesh, Bennett Coleman & Co. Ltd. p. 2.
- Kariappa, Anjali (2006). Spectrum (The Deccan Herald), Drive Into Autofest City. Bangalore, India: V. Padmanabhan. p. 2. CPMG/KA/BGE-197/2001 Vol.54 No.188.
- Ganapathy, Deepti (2006). Mysore Plus (The Times of India) Revving Up A Hobby. Bangalore, India: Bennett Coleman & Co. Ltd. p. 1. CPMG/KA/BG-GPO-31/2003-05.
- Rodrigues, Gracian (2006). Amchem Jivith It's Autofest City, For A Drive Of Your Lifetime. Mysore, India: Konkani Christian Association, Mysore. p. 106.
- Chandran, Sirish (2007). Overdrive, Small Wonders. Navi Mumbai, India: Krishna Tewari, Infomedia India Ltd. p. 2. RNI No. 69122/98.
- Murali, Vaishnavi (2008). Sunday Times (The Times of India), Mad About Models. Bangalore, India: Bennett Coleman & Co. Ltd. p. 16. CPMG/KA/BG-GPO-31/2003-05.
- Belur, Shankar (2009). District Plus (The Hindu) They Own Every Car In The World. Chennai, India: N. Ram. p. 2.
