= Psikhelekedana =

Traditional art form in Mozambique

Psikhelekedana is a traditional art form from the south of Mozambique that is dating back to at least colonial times. Psikhelekedana are miniature models consisting of small wood carvings painted in bright, glossy colors.

== History ==
Psikhelekedana originates from the Ronga, an ethnic group living in what today are the Maputo and Gaza Province of Mozambique. Initially these sculptures reflected the agricultural environment of their makers as they depicted wild animals such as birds, snakes or crocodiles or household objects such as spoons, bowls or masks. These sculptures were made from the wood of the Trichilia emetica, a tree of the Mahogany family found in Southern Africa.

With urbanization Psikhelekedana sculptures began to diversify and to depict modern objects like cars, radios or motorcycles or people in the city. Since the 1980s and especially since the end of the Mozambican Civil War in 1992 the dominant trend in this art form is the depiction of events from Mozambican history. Events depicted by artists include for example the arrival of Vasco da Gama, the Carlos Cardoso murder trial or the 2000 Mozambique flood.

Nowadays most artists work in cooperatives. Although most sculptures are sold as souvenirs to tourists and foreigners, Psikhelekedana received serious recognition with exhibitions at the French Cultural Center Maputo in 2003 and the Instituto Camões in Maputo in 2005. Psikhelekedana can also be found in the Museu Nacional de Arte in Maputo. Notable Psikhelekedana artists include Crimildo Cumbe, Samuel Balói, Dino Jethá, Bernardo Valói and Abel Nhantumbo.

== Characteristics ==
Most modern Psikhelekedana sculptures are ironic and unconventional. Their depiction of Mozambican history usually follows the official interpretation of the Mozambican Liberation Front and their optimistic and modernising ideology. Despite these limitations Psikhelekedana sculptures can serve not only as a work of art, but also as a documentation of important events in the history of Mozambique.
