= Daniel Dorall =

Malaysian Australian sculptor

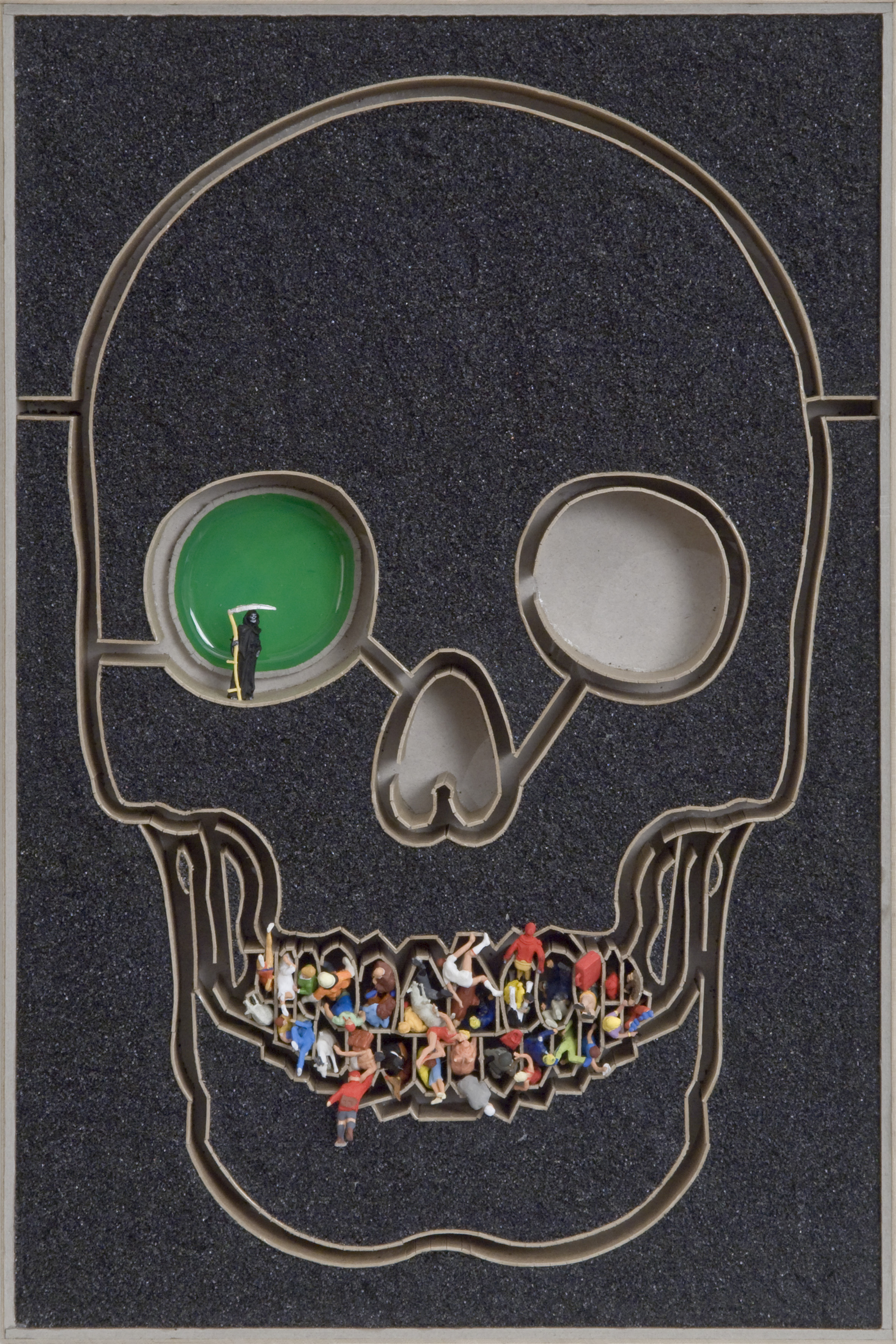
- Born: 1979 (age 46–47); Penang, Malaysia
- Education: Bachelor of Science in Architecture (Honours), University of Malaya, Bachelor of Architecture, University of Melbourne, Master of Fine Art (Sculpture), Monash University
- Known for: Sculpture, Architecture, Modernism

Daniel Dorall (born 1979) is a Malaysian Australian sculptor who specialises in miniature works. He completed a Bachelor of Architecture at the University of Melbourne in 2005, having previously earned a Bachelor of Science in Architecture with honours from the University of Malaya in 2002. He has recently completed a Master of Fine Art in sculpture at Monash University. Dorall has exhibited his works in Australia, New Zealand, Asia and Europe since 2005.

== Work ==
His current art practice is informed by his fascination with the formal properties and possibilities of miniature maze-like constructions. Dorall's interest lies in employing the maze as the conceptual medium of his artwork. The mazes represent a constructed space stripped of functional value, wherein minute human figures play out various narratives. The themes in his work are self-exploration, tragicomedy, social and urban issues, sexuality, religion, memory and nostalgia and mythical/historical enactments. The audience is free to interpret Dorall's representations of human foibles on various levels. The audience is a voyeur, spying on grief and predicting the fate of the trapped game, but powerless to intercede

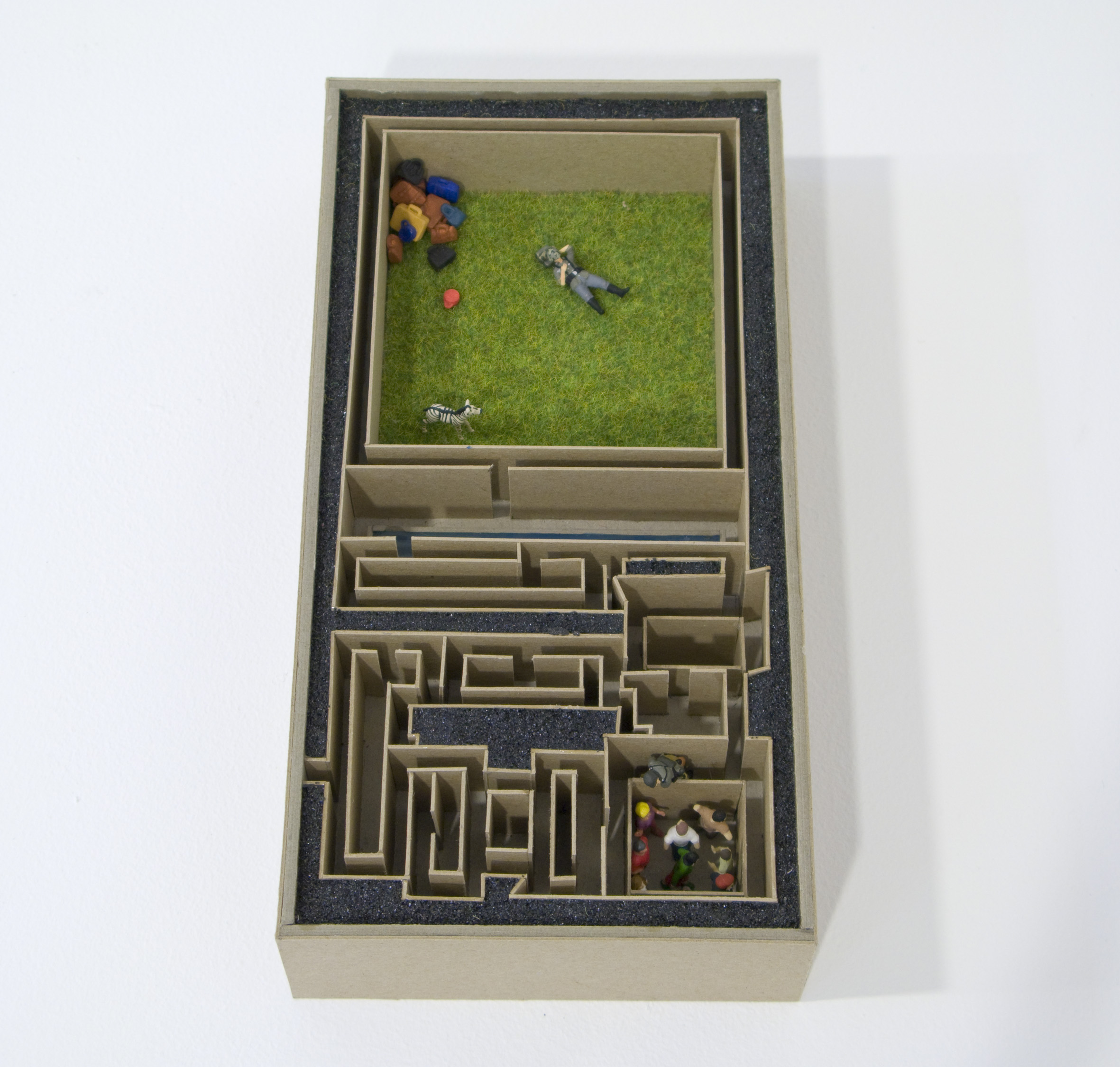
Daniel Dorall, Asylum, 2005, Cardboard, sand, plastic, hydrocryl, 20 x 10 × 4 cm

Dorall's work has strong links to the Surrealist tradition of representing scenarios from the unconscious: His exquisite structures perform in the manner of our most puzzling dreams; they make perfect sense while also being completely irrational

Australian art critic Robert Nelson finds in Dorall's work a nightmarish representation of the claustrophobic and stultifying nature of suburbia: Most frighteningly, Dorall takes us to the very set-up of domestic life, where we package our existence in suburban blocks with ... the circuitry of paths and borders, beds and lawns, all obsessively demarcating private spaces .... Dorall's little figures sit conversing in vast expanses of artificially enclosed greens, all alienated from the organic pulse of the city, insulated, modularised and upmarket.

Writing for Dorall's 2009 exhibition under the Bombay Saphire Arts Project, Simpang, Malaysia, curator Simon Soon remarks: Dorall's mazes makes us aware of the possible choices we make in life. Within the maze construction, one encounters by peering in from above, like God's eye view, the dramatic cycle of human existence and its emotional range: loneliness, joy, fear, serenity, are mapped out within a physical geography that sets the stage for the ensuing encounters.

The Inversion Theory

Dorall's most recent work involves inverting the traditional concept that architectural or scale models are seen as studies for human-scale buildings or final constructions. He aims to convince the viewer that the miniature object can be the final object. He has been exploring this concept by building full size walk-through mazes and placing the maze object within these mazes. The viewer is asked to walk through the installation maze and experience its journey. When they finally discover the maze object, they get a better understanding (through their recent experience) of the narratives involving the figurines in the maze objects.

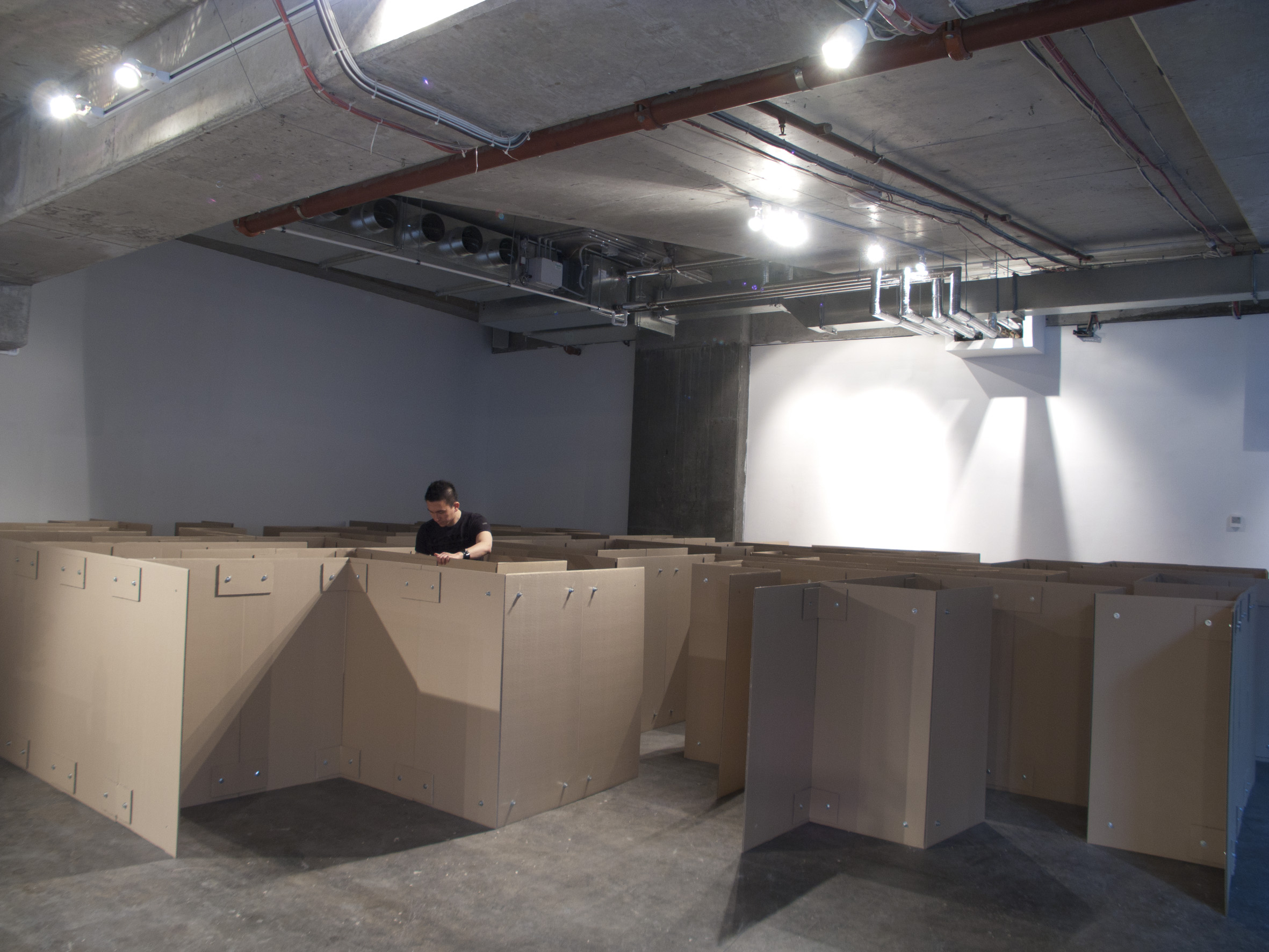
Daniel Dorall, Installation of The Inversion Theory, 2011, Corrugated Cardboard, platted bolts and nuts, 12 x 10 x 1.2 m

In a major solo exhibition The Inversion Theory, held in 2011, Dorall explores the concept of using full size constructions and installations as studies for the miniature – on a grand scale. The exhibition consisted of a walkthrough cardboard installation maze, inviting the viewer to meander through its corridors finally arriving at the sculptural maze object. As the anthropomorphic maze installation is positioned as a precursor to the maze object, it acts as a study by allowing the viewer to experience first-hand the emotions and ambience of the construction. At the end of the journey, the viewer has a better understanding when viewing the figurines playing out the narrative within the maze object – in tragic, comedic or horrid detail. Thus the idea of a miniature or scale model as a study and the full size construction as the end product - is inverted. This is the basis of the inversion theory.

Dorall's writings on viewing the human scale/full scale object or construction as study for the miniature object - inverting the typical architectural concept where scale models are used as precursors to final constructions - was published as a book in 2013.

== Exhibitions ==
In Melbourne, Dorall has held exhibitions at: George Paton Gallery; Gertrude Contemporary Art Spaces; Red Gallery; Dianne Tanzer Gallery; Faculty Gallery, Monash University.

He has also exhibited at: Valentine Willie Fine Art, Kuala Lumpur, Malaysia; The Kiosk / The Physics Room, Christchurch, New Zealand.
