= Miniature figure =

Miniature figures may be used as:

- Miniature figure (gaming), in miniature wargaming and roleplaying games
- A collectable figurine, often an artistic, and sometimes a prehistoric or antique specimen
- Toy soldier
- Lego minifigure
