= M16 rifle =

American assault rifle

Rifle, Caliber 5.56 mm, M16
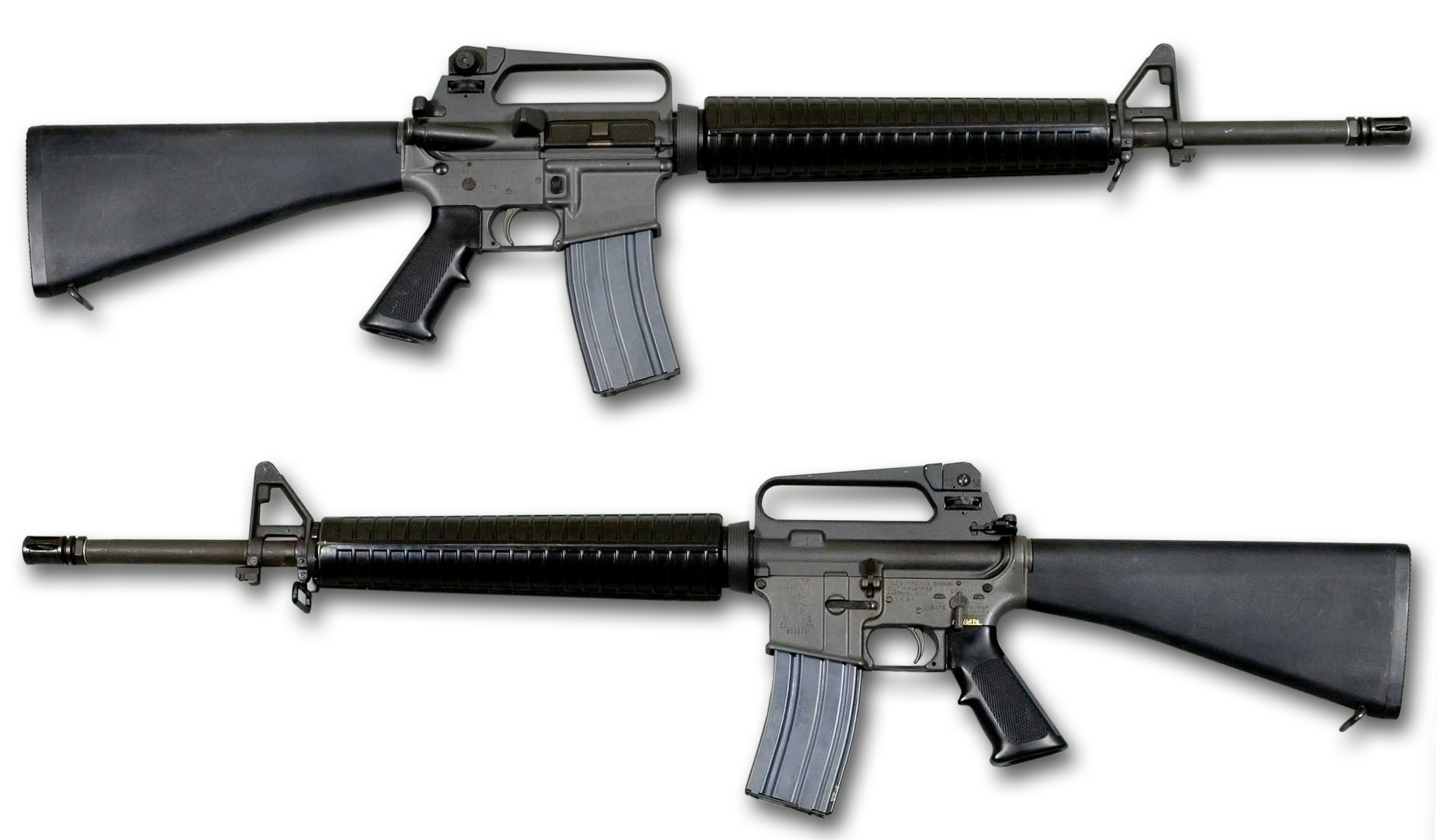
- M16A2, multi-sided view
- Type: Assault rifle
- Place of origin: United States

Service history
- In service: 1964–present
- Used by: See Users
- Wars: See Conflicts

Production history
- Designer: Eugene Stoner (AR-10); L. James Sullivan (AR-15)
- Designed: 1959
- Manufacturer: Colt's Manufacturing Company; FN Herstal (Note: FN Herstal did not acquire traditional licensing, but as a direct contract from the U.S. government for the U.S. military.); General Motors (Hydramatic Division); Harrington & Richardson; Remington; U.S. Ordnance; Chartered Industries of Singapore; Diemaco; Elisco Tool Manufacturing Company; Ministry of Defense Arsenal (Note: South Korea is the only nation that acquired 100% domestic production rights besides the United States.)
- Produced: November 1963–present
- No. built: ~8 million ~28 million AR-15–style rifles
- Variants: See List of Colt AR-15 and M16 rifle variants

Specifications (M16)
- Mass: Unloaded: 6.37 lb (2.89 kg) (M16A1); 7.5 lb (3.40 kg) (M16A2 without magazine and sling); 7.5 lb (3.40 kg) (M16A4); 8.81 lb (4.00 kg) (M16A4 loaded with 30 rounds and sling)
- Length: 38.81 in (986 mm) (M16A1); 39.63 in (1,007 mm) (M16A2); 39.37 in (1,000 mm) (M16A4)
- Barrel length: 20 in (508 mm); 1:12 twist rate (M16A1 and earlier models); 1:7 twist rate (M16A2 and later models)
- Cartridge: .223 Remington / M193 (M16A1 and earlier models); 5.56×45mm NATO / M855 (M16A2 and later models)
- Action: Gas-operated, closed rotating bolt, Stoner bolt and carrier piston
- Rate of fire: 700–800 rounds/min cyclic sustained (M16A1); 700–900 rounds/min cyclic sustained (M16A2, M16A3); 800 rounds/min cyclic sustained (M16A4)
- Muzzle velocity: 3,150 ft/s (960 m/s) (M855A1 round)
- Effective firing range: 550 m (601 yd) (point target); 800 m (875 yd) (area target)
- Maximum firing range: 3,600 m (3,937 yd)
- Feed system: STANAG magazine 20-round detachable box magazine 30-round detachable box magazine 40-round detachable box magazine 60-round detachable box magazine Beta C-Mag 100-round drum magazine
- Sights: Iron sights: Rear: aperture; L-type flip Front: wing-protected post Various aiming optics

The M16 rifle (officially designated Rifle, Caliber 5.56mm, M16) is a family of assault rifles adapted from the ArmaLite AR-15 rifle for the United States military. The original M16 rifle was a 5.56×45mm Remington automatic rifle with a 20-round magazine.

In 1964, the XM16E1 entered US military service as the M16 and in the following year was deployed for jungle warfare operations during the Vietnam War. In 1969, the M16A1 replaced the M14 rifle to become the US military's standard service rifle. The M16A1 incorporated numerous modifications, including a bolt-assist ("forward-assist"), chrome-plated bore, protective reinforcement around the magazine release, and a revised flash hider.

In 1983, the United States Marine Corps adopted the M16A2 rifle, and the US Army adopted it in 1986. The M16A2 fires the improved 5.56×45mm NATO (M855/SS109) cartridge and has a newer adjustable rear sight, case deflector, heavy barrel, improved handguard, pistol grip, and buttstock, as well as a semi-auto and three-round burst fire selector. Adopted in July 1997, the M16A4 is the fourth generation of the M16 series. It is equipped with a removable carrying handle and quad Picatinny rail for mounting optics and other ancillary devices.

The M16 has also been widely adopted by other armed forces around the world. Total worldwide production of M16s is approximately eight million, making it the most-produced firearm of its 5.56mm caliber. The US military has largely replaced the M16 in frontline combat units with a shorter and lighter version, the M4 carbine. In April 2022, the U.S. Army selected the SIG MCX SPEAR as the winner of the Next Generation Squad Weapon Program to replace the M16/M4. The new rifle is designated M7.

== History ==
=== Background ===
In 1928, a U.S. Army 'Caliber Board' conducted firing tests at Aberdeen Proving Ground and recommended transitioning to smaller caliber rounds, mentioning, in particular .27 in (6.86 mm) caliber. Largely in deference to tradition, this recommendation was ignored and the Army referred to the .30 in (7.62 mm) caliber as "full-sized" for the next 35 years. After World War II, the United States military started looking for a single automatic rifle to replace the M1 Garand, M1/M2 carbines, M1918 Browning automatic rifle, M3 "Grease Gun" and Thompson submachine gun. However, early experiments with select-fire versions of the M1 Garand proved disappointing. During the Korean War, the select-fire M2 carbine largely replaced the submachine gun in US service and became the most widely used carbine variant. However, combat experience suggested that the .30 carbine round was underpowered. American weapons designers concluded that an intermediate round was necessary, and recommended a small-caliber, high-velocity cartridge.

However, senior American commanders, having faced fanatical enemies and experienced major logistical problems during World War II and the Korean War, insisted that a single, powerful .30 caliber cartridge be developed, that could not only be used by the new automatic rifle but by the new general-purpose machine gun (GPMG) in concurrent development. This culminated in the development of the 7.62×51mm NATO cartridge.

The U.S. Army then began testing several rifles to replace the obsolete M1. Springfield Armory's T44E4 and heavier T44E5 were essentially updated versions of the M1 chambered for the new 7.62mm round, while Fabrique Nationale submitted their FN FAL as the T48. ArmaLite entered the competition late, hurriedly submitting several AR-10 prototype rifles in the fall of 1956 to the U.S. Army's Springfield Armory for testing. The AR-10 featured an innovative straight-line barrel/stock design, forged aluminum alloy receivers, and with phenolic composite stocks. It had rugged elevated sights, an oversized aluminum (Note: Later changed to titanium.) flash suppressor and recoil compensator, and an adjustable gas system. The final prototype featured an upper and lower receiver with the now-familiar hinge and takedown pins, and the charging handle was on top of the receiver placed inside of the carry handle. For a 7.62mm NATO rifle, the AR-10 was incredibly lightweight at only 6.85 lb (3.11 kg) empty. Initial comments by Springfield Armory test staff were favorable, and some testers commented that the AR-10 was the best lightweight automatic rifle ever tested by the Armory. In the end, the U.S. Army chose the T44, now named the M14 rifle, which was an improved M1 Garand with a 20-round magazine and automatic fire capability. (Note: Per Jane's International Defense Review: "The M14 is basically an improved M1 with a modified gas system and detachable 20-round magazine.") The U.S. also adopted the M60 general-purpose machine gun (GPMG). Its NATO partners adopted the FN FAL and HK G3 rifles, as well as the FN MAG and Rheinmetall MG3 GPMGs.

The first confrontations between the AK-47 and the M14 came in the early part of the Vietnam War. Battlefield reports indicated that the M14 was uncontrollable in full-auto and that soldiers could not carry enough ammunition to maintain fire superiority over the AK-47. And, while the M2 carbine offered a high rate of fire, it was under-powered and ultimately outclassed by the AK-47. A replacement was needed: a medium between the traditional preference for high-powered rifles such as the M14, and the lightweight firepower of the M2 carbine.

As a result, the Army was forced to reconsider a 1957 request by General Willard G. Wyman, commander of the U.S. Continental Army Command (CONARC), to develop a .223 Remington select-fire rifle weighing 6 lb (2.7 kg) when loaded with a 20-round magazine. The 5.56mm round had to penetrate a standard U.S. helmet at 500 yards (460 meters) and retain a velocity over the speed of sound while matching or exceeding the wounding ability of the .30 carbine cartridge.

This request ultimately resulted in ArmaLite developing a scaled-down version of the AR-10, named the AR-15. The AR-15 was first revealed by Eugene Stoner at Fort Benning in May 1957. The AR-15 used .22-caliber bullets, which destabilized when they hit a human body, as opposed to the .30 round, which typically passed through in a straight line. The smaller caliber meant that it could be controlled in auto fire due to the reduced bolt thrust and free recoil impulse. Being almost one-third the weight of the .30 meant that the soldier could sustain fire for longer with the same load. Due to design innovations, the AR-15 could fire 600 to 700 rounds a minute with an extremely low jamming rate. Parts were stamped out, not hand-machined, so they could be mass-produced, and the stock was plastic to reduce weight.

In 1958, the Army's Combat Developments Experimentation Command ran experiments with small squads in combat situations using the M14, AR-15, and Winchester's Light Weight Military Rifle (WLWMR). The resulting study recommended adopting a lightweight rifle like the AR-15. In response, the Army declared that all rifles and machine guns should use the same ammunition and ordered full production of the M14. However, advocates for the AR-15 gained the attention of Air Force Chief of Staff General Curtis LeMay. After testing the AR-15 with the ammunition manufactured by Remington that Armalite and Colt recommended, the Air Force declared that the AR-15 was its 'standard model' and ordered 8,500 rifles and 8.5 million rounds. Advocates for the AR-15 in the Defense Advanced Research Projects Agency acquired 1,000 Air Force AR-15s and shipped them to be tested by the Army of the Republic of Vietnam (ARVN). The South Vietnam soldiers issued glowing reports of the weapon's reliability, recording zero broken parts while firing 80,000 rounds in one stage of testing, and requiring only two replacement parts for the 1,000 weapons over the entire course of testing. The report of the experiment recommended that the U.S. provide the AR-15 as the standard rifle of the ARVN, but Admiral Harry Felt, then Commander in Chief of Pacific Forces, rejected the recommendations on the advice of the U.S. Army.

Throughout 1962 and 1963, the U.S. military extensively tested the AR-15. Positive evaluations emphasized its lightness, "lethality", and reliability. However, the Army Materiel Command criticized its inaccuracy and lack of penetrating power at longer ranges. In early 1963, the U.S. Special Forces asked and was given permission, to make the AR-15 its standard weapon. Other users included Army Airborne units in Vietnam and some units affiliated with the Central Intelligence Agency. As more units adopted the AR-15, Secretary of the Army Cyrus Vance ordered an investigation into why the weapon had been rejected by the Army. The resulting report found that Army Materiel Command had rigged the previous tests, selecting tests that would favor the M14 and choosing match grade M14s to compete against AR-15s out of the box. At this point, the bureaucratic battle lines were well-defined, with the Army ordnance agencies opposed to the AR-15 and the Air Force and civilian leadership of the Defense Department in favor.

In January 1963, Secretary of Defense Robert McNamara concluded that the AR-15 was the superior weapon system and ordered a halt to M14 production. In late 1963, the Defense Department began mass procurement of rifles for the Air Force and special Army units. Secretary McNamara designated the Army as the procurer for the weapon with the department, which allowed the Army ordnance establishment to modify the weapon as they wished. The first modification was the addition of a "manual bolt closure", allowing a soldier to ram in a round if it failed to seat properly. The Air Force, which was buying the rifle, and the Marine Corps, which had tested it both objected to this addition, with the Air Force noting, "During three years of testing and operation of the AR-15 rifle under all types of conditions the Air Force has no record of malfunctions that could have been corrected by a manual bolt closing device." They also noted that the closure added weight and complexity, reducing the reliability of the weapon. Colonel Harold Yount, who managed the Army procurement, would later state the bolt closure was added after direction from senior leadership, rather than as a result of any complaint or test result, and testified about the reasons: "the M-1, the M-14, and the carbine had always had something for the soldier to push on; that maybe this would be a comforting feeling to him or something."

After modifications, the new redesigned rifle was subsequently adopted as the M16 Rifle:

(The M16) was much lighter compared to the M14 it replaced, ultimately allowing soldiers to carry more ammunition. The air-cooled, gas-operated, magazine-fed assault rifle was made of steel, aluminum alloy, and composite plastics, truly cutting-edge for the time. Designed with full and semi-automatic capabilities, the weapon initially did not respond well to wet and dirty conditions, sometimes even jamming in combat. After a few minor modifications, the weapon gained in popularity among troops on the battlefield. (Note: Per Haas: "Nicknamed a 'Mattel toy' because of its small caliber and lightweight design, the M16 became the standard service rifle for U.S. forces in Vietnam in 1967. The weapon was much lighter compared to the M14 it replaced, ultimately allowing Soldiers to carry more ammunition. The air-cooled, gas-operated, magazine-fed assault rifle was made of steel, aluminum alloy and composite plastics, truly cutting-edge for the time. Designed with full and semi-automatic capabilities, the weapon initially did not respond well to wet and dirty conditions, sometimes even jamming in combat. After a few minor modifications, the weapon gained in popularity among troops on the battlefield. Still in service today, the M16 is being phased out by the M4 carbine.")

Despite its early failures, the M16 later proved to be a solid design and remains the longest continuously serving rifle in US military history. It has been adopted by many US allies, and the 5.56×45mm NATO cartridge has become both the NATO standard and "the standard assault-rifle cartridge in much of the world". It also led to the development of small-caliber high-velocity service rifles by every major army in the world. It is a benchmark against which other assault rifles are judged. (Note: Per Gourley: "Colt literature notes that the fourth generation of the M16 "still represents the world standard by which all other weapons of this class are judged. Its combat-proven performance is verified by the fact that over eight million M16 weapon systems have been produced and placed in military service throughout the world." Per Valpolini: "Among western armies the M4 with its 356-mm-long barrel remains the benchmark type, although reports from the field have shown some criticism regarding its reliability in sand and dusty environments due to the direct impingement or 'gas-tube' system that tends to bring carbon blow-back into the chamber, while hot gases used to cycle the weapon generate heat problems.")

=== Adoption ===
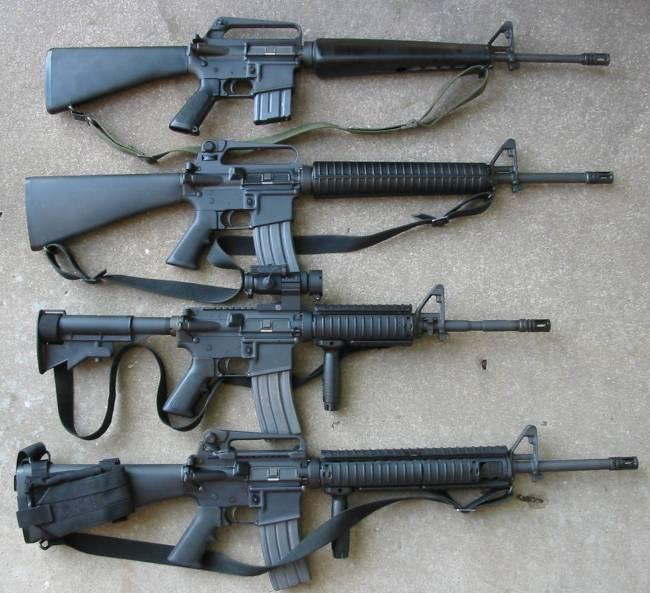
From top to bottom: M16A1, M16A2, M4A1, M16A4.

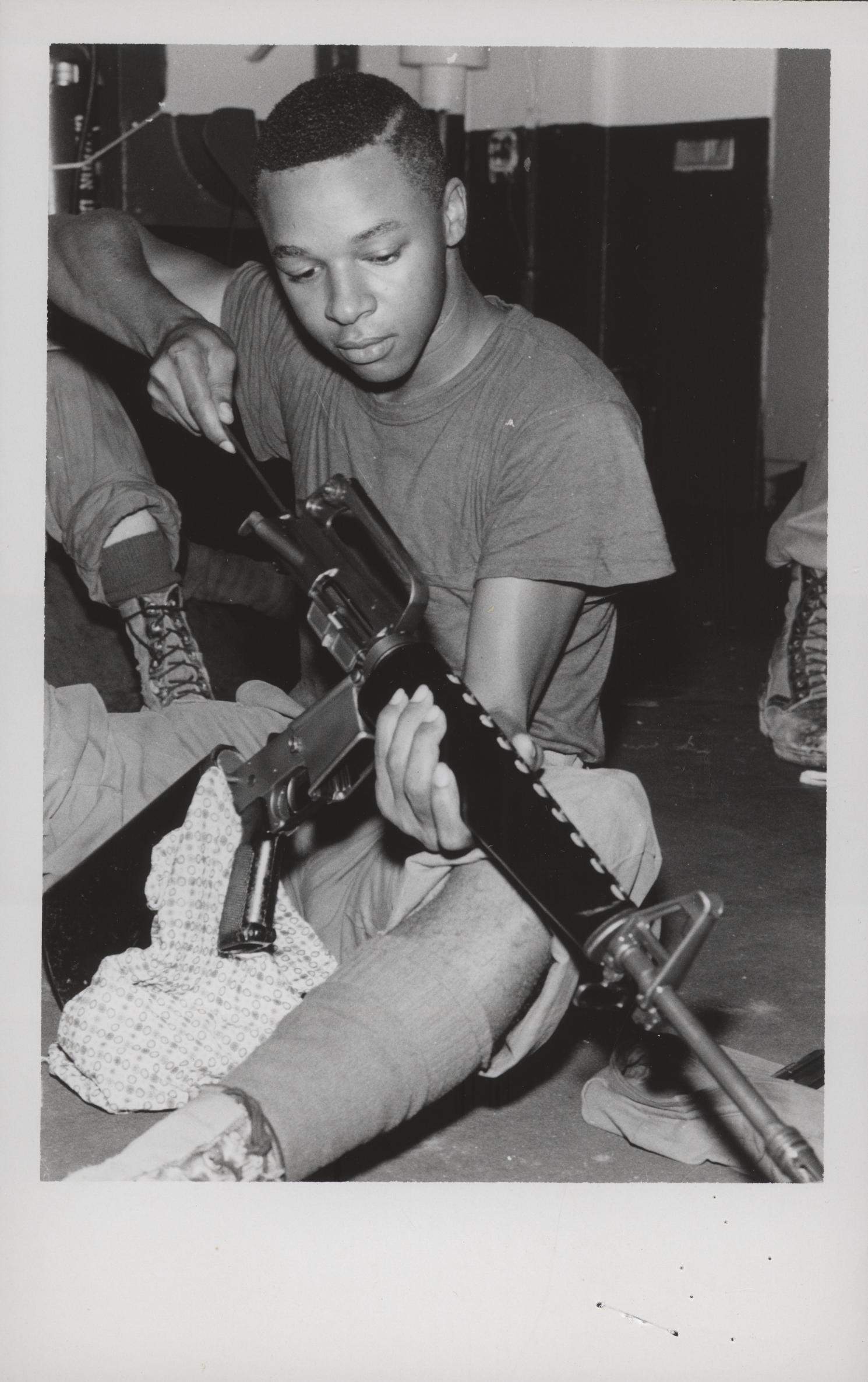
A Marine of the 3rd Battalion, 1st Marines cleans his XM16E1 in December 1967.

In July 1960, General Curtis LeMay was impressed by a demonstration of the ArmaLite AR-15. In the summer of 1961, General LeMay was promoted to U.S. Air Force chief of staff and requested 80,000 AR-15s. However, General Maxwell D. Taylor, chairman of the Joint Chiefs of Staff, advised President John F. Kennedy that having two different calibers within the military system at the same time would be problematic and the request was rejected. In October 1961, William Godel, a senior man at the Advanced Research Projects Agency, sent 10 AR-15s to South Vietnam. The reception was enthusiastic, and in 1962 another 1,000 AR-15s were sent. United States Army Special Forces personnel filed battlefield reports lavishly praising the AR-15 and the stopping power of the 5.56 mm cartridge and pressed for its adoption.

The damage caused by the 5.56 mm bullet was originally believed to be caused by "tumbling" due to the slow 1 turn in 14-inch (360 mm) rifling twist rate. However, any pointed lead core bullet will "tumble" after penetration into flesh, because the center of gravity is towards the rear of the bullet. The large wounds observed by soldiers in Vietnam were caused by bullet fragmentation created by a combination of the bullet's velocity and construction. These wounds were so devastating that the photographs remained classified into the 1980s.

However, despite overwhelming evidence that the AR-15 could bring more firepower to bear than the M14, the Army opposed the adoption of the new rifle. U.S. Secretary of Defense Robert McNamara now had two conflicting views: the ARPA report favoring the AR-15 and the Army's position favoring the M14. Even President Kennedy expressed concern, so McNamara ordered Secretary of the Army, Cyrus Vance, to test the M14, the AR-15, and the AK-47. The Army reported that only the M14 was suitable for service, but Vance wondered about the impartiality of those conducting the tests. He ordered the Army Inspector General to investigate the testing methods used; the inspector general confirmed that the testers were biased toward the M14.

In January 1963, Secretary McNamara received reports that M14 production was insufficient to meet the needs of the armed forces and ordered a halt to M14 production. At the time, the AR-15 was the only rifle that could fulfill a requirement of a "universal" infantry weapon for issue to all services. McNamara ordered its adoption, despite receiving reports of several deficiencies, most notably the lack of a chrome-plated chamber.

After modifications (most notably, the charging handle was re-located from under the carrying handle like the AR-10, to the rear of the receiver), the newly redesigned rifle was renamed the Rifle, Caliber 5.56 mm, M16. Inexplicably, the modification to the new M16 did not include a chrome-plated barrel. Meanwhile, the Army relented and recommended the adoption of the M16 for jungle warfare operations. However, the Army insisted on the inclusion of a forward assist to help push the bolt into battery if a cartridge failed to seat into the chamber. The Air Force, Colt, and Eugene Stoner believed that the addition of a forward assist was an unjustified expense. As a result, the design was split into two variants: the Air Force's M16 without the forward assist, and the XM16E1 with the forward assist for the other service branches.

In November 1963, McNamara approved the U.S. Army's order of 85,000 XM16E1s; and to appease General LeMay, the Air Force was granted an order for another 19,000 M16s. In March 1964, the M16 rifle went into production and the Army accepted delivery of the first batch of 2,129 rifles later that year, and an additional 57,240 rifles the following year.

In 1964, the Army was informed that DuPont could not mass-produce the IMR 4475 stick powder to the specifications demanded by the M16. Therefore, Olin Mathieson Company provided a high-performance ball propellant. While the Olin WC 846 powder achieved the desired 3,300 ft (1,000 m) per second muzzle velocity, it produced much more fouling, which quickly jammed the M16's action (unless the rifle was cleaned well and often).

In March 1965, the Army began to issue the XM16E1 to infantry units. However, the rifle was initially delivered without adequate cleaning kits or instructions because advertising from Colt asserted that the M16's materials made the weapon require little maintenance, leading to a misconception that it was capable of self-cleaning. Furthermore, cleaning was often conducted with improper equipment, such as insect repellent, water, and aircraft fuel, which induced further wear on the weapon. As a result, reports of stoppages in combat began to surface. The most severe problem was known as "failure to extract"—the spent cartridge case remained lodged in the chamber after the rifle was fired. Documented accounts of dead U.S. troops found next to disassembled rifles eventually led to a Congressional investigation:

We left with 72 men in our platoon and came back with 19. ...Believe it or not, you know what killed most of us? Our own rifle. Practically every one of our dead was found with his (M16) torn down next to him where he had been trying to fix it.

— Marine Corps Rifleman, Vietnam.

In February 1967, the improved XM16E1 was standardized as the M16A1. The new rifle had a chrome-plated chamber and bore to eliminate corrosion and stuck cartridges, and other minor modifications. New cleaning kits, powder solvents, and lubricants were also issued. Intensive training programs in weapons cleaning were instituted including a comic book-style operations manual. As a result, reliability problems were largely resolved and the M16A1 rifle achieved widespread acceptance by U.S. troops in Vietnam.

In 1969, the M16A1 officially replaced the M14 rifle to become the U.S. military's standard service rifle. In 1970, the new WC 844 powder was introduced to reduce fouling.

Colt, H&R, and GM Hydramatic Division manufactured M16A1 rifles during the Vietnam War. M16s were produced by Colt until the late 1980s when FN Herstal (FN USA) began to manufacture them.

== Reliability ==
The M16 gas redirect system, incorrectly labeled as direct impingement. The gif does not show the operating mechanism of the rifle, only the gas redirect system.

During the early part of its service, the M16 had a reputation for poor reliability and a malfunction rate of two per 1000 rounds fired. The M16's action works by passing high-pressure propellant gasses, tapped from the barrel, down a tube and into the carrier group within the upper receiver. The gas goes from the gas tube, through the bolt carrier key, and into the inside of the carrier where it expands in a donut-shaped gas-piston cylinder. Because the bolt is prevented from moving forward by the barrel, the carrier is driven to the rear by the expanding gases and thus converts the energy of the gas to the movement of the rifle's parts. The back part of the bolt forms a piston head and the cavity in the bolt carrier is the piston sleeve. While the M16 is commonly said to use a direct impingement system, this is incorrect, and it is instead correct to say it uses an internal piston system. This system is however ammunition specific, since it does not have an adjustable gas port or valve to adjust the weapon to various propellant and projectile or barrel length specific pressure behavior.

The M16 operating system designed by Stoner is lighter and more compact than a gas-piston design. However, this design requires that combustion byproducts from the discharged cartridge be blown into the receiver as well. This accumulating carbon and vaporized metal build-up within the receiver and bolt carrier negatively affects reliability and necessitates more intensive maintenance on the part of the individual soldier. The channeling of gasses into the bolt carrier during operation increases the amount of heat that is deposited in the receiver while firing the M16 and causes the essential lubricant to be "burned off". This requires frequent and generous applications of appropriate lubricant. Lack of proper lubrication is the most common source of weapon stoppages or jams.

The original M16 fared poorly in the jungles of Vietnam and was infamous for reliability problems in harsh environments. Max Hastings was very critical of the M16's general field issue in Vietnam just as grievous design flaws were becoming apparent. He further states that the Shooting Times experienced repeated malfunctions with a test M16 and assumed these would be corrected before military use, but they were not. Many Marines and soldiers were so angry with the reliability problems they began writing home and on 26 March 1967, the Washington Daily News broke the story. Eventually, the M16 became the target of a congressional investigation. (Note: This was dubbed the Ichord hearings after Missouri representative Richard Ichord, who championed Congress's inquiry into failures of the M-16 during the Vietnam War.)

The investigation found that:

- The M16 was issued to troops without cleaning kits or instructions on how to clean the rifle.
- The M16 and 5.56×45mm cartridge was tested and approved with the use of a DuPont IMR8208M extruded powder, which was switched to Olin Mathieson WC846 ball powder, which produced much more fouling, which quickly jammed the action of the M16 (unless the gun was cleaned well and often).
- The M16 lacked a forward assist (rendering the rifle inoperable when it failed to go fully forward).
- The M16 lacked a chrome-plated chamber, which allowed corrosion problems and contributed to case-extraction failures (which was considered the most severe problem and required extreme measures to clear, such as inserting the cleaning rod down the barrel and knocking the spent cartridge out).

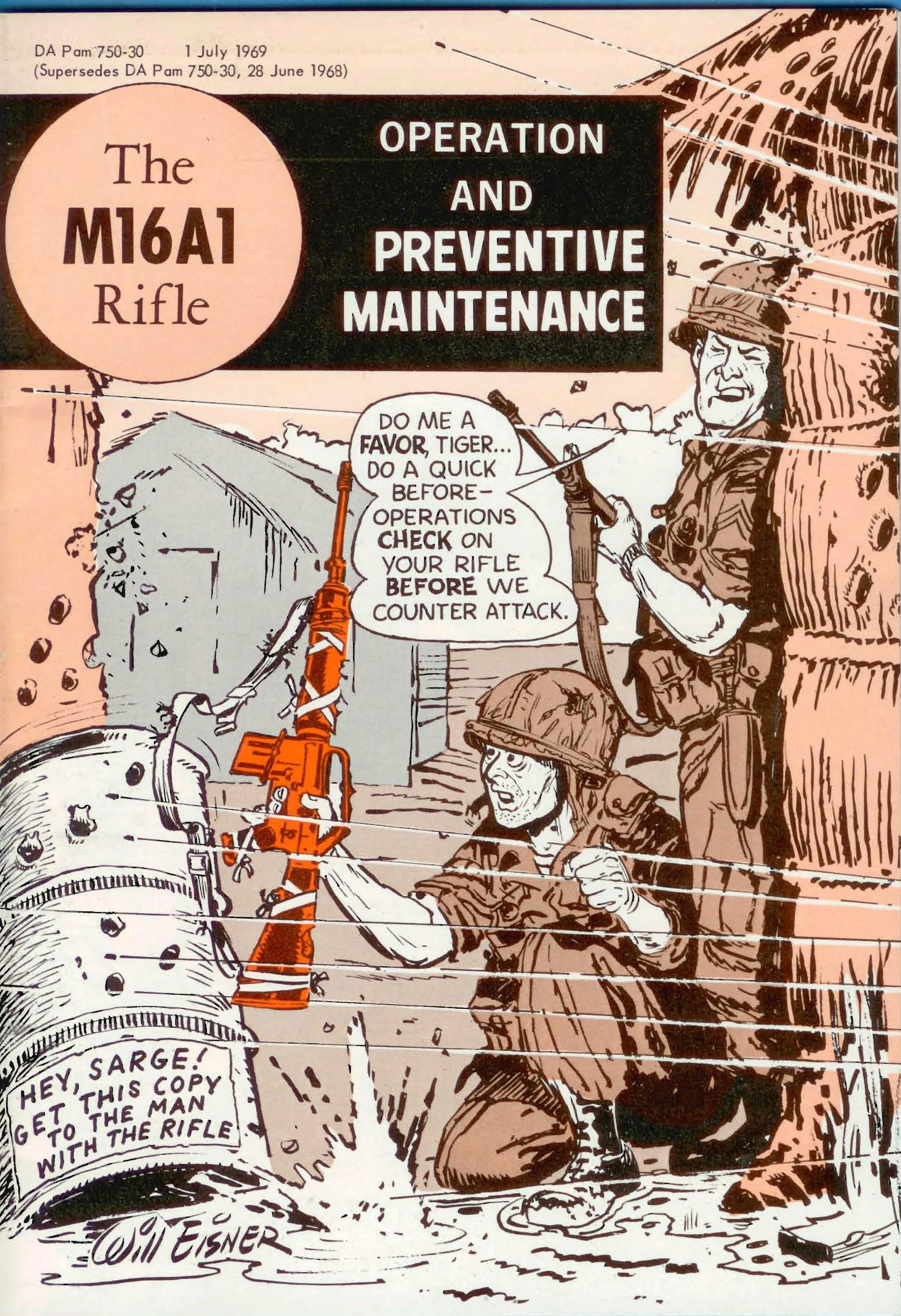
Front cover – The M16A1 Rifle – Operation and Preventive Maintenance by Will Eisner, issued to American soldiers in 1969 during the Vietnam War

When these issues were addressed and corrected by the M16A1, the reliability problems decreased greatly. According to a 1968 Department of Army report, the M16A1 rifle achieved widespread acceptance by U.S. troops in Vietnam. "Most men armed with the M16 in Vietnam rated this rifle's performance high, however, many men entertained some misgivings about the M16's reliability. When asked what weapon they preferred to carry in combat, 85 percent indicated that they wanted either the M16 or its [smaller] carbine-length version, the XM177E2." Also, "the M14 was preferred by 15 percent, while less than one percent wished to carry either the Stoner rifle, the AK-47, the [M1] carbine or a pistol." In March 1970, the "President's Blue Ribbon Defense Panel" concluded that the issuance of the M16 saved the lives of 20,000 U.S. servicemen during the Vietnam War, who would have otherwise died had the M14 remained in service. However, the M16 rifle's reputation has suffered as of 2011.

Another underlying cause of the M16's jamming problem was identified by ordnance staff that discovered that Stoner and ammunition manufacturers had initially tested the AR-15 using DuPont IMR8208M extruded (stick) powder. Later ammunition manufacturers adopted the more readily available Olin Mathieson WC846 ball powder. The ball powder produced a longer peak chamber pressure with undesired timing effects. Upon firing, the cartridge case expands and seals the chamber (obturation). When the peak pressure starts to drop the cartridge case contracts and then can be extracted. With ball powder, the cartridge case was not contracted enough during extraction due to the longer peak pressure period. The ejector would then fail to extract the cartridge case, tearing through the case rim, and leaving an obturated case behind.

After the introduction of the M4 carbine, it was found that the shorter barrel length of 14.5 inches also harms the reliability, as the gas port is located closer to the chamber than the gas port of the standard length M16 rifle: 7.5 inches instead of 13 inches. This affects the M4's timing and increases the amount of stress and heat on the critical components, thereby reducing reliability. In a 2002 assessment, the USMC found that the M4 malfunctioned three times more often than the M16A4 (the M4 failed 186 times for 69,000 rounds fired, while the M16A4 failed 61 times). Thereafter, the Army and Colt worked to make modifications to the M4s and M16A4s to address the problems found. In tests conducted in 2005 and 2006 the Army found that on average, the new M4s and M16s fired approximately 5,000 rounds between stoppages.

In December 2006, the Center for Naval Analyses (CNA) released a report on U.S. small arms in combat. The CNA conducted surveys on 2,608 troops returning from combat in Iraq and Afghanistan over the past 12 months. Only troops who had fired their weapons at enemy targets were allowed to participate; 1,188 troops were armed with M16A2 or A4 rifles, making up 46 percent of the survey. Seventy-five percent of M16 users (891 troops) reported they were satisfied with the weapon. 60 percent (713 troops) were satisfied with handling qualities such as handguards, size, and weight. Of the 40 percent dissatisfied, most were with its size. Only 19 percent of M16 users (226 troops) reported a stoppage, while 80 percent of those that experienced a stoppage said it had little effect on their ability to clear the stoppage and re-engage their target. Half of the M16 users experienced failures in their magazines to feed. Eight-three percent (986 troops) did not need their rifles repaired while in the theater. Seventy-one percent (843 troops) were confident in the M16's reliability, defined as a level of soldier confidence their weapon will fire without malfunction, and 72 percent (855 troops) were confident in its durability, defined as a level of soldier confidence their weapon will not break or need repair. Both factors were attributed to high levels of soldiers performing their maintenance. 60 percent of M16 users offered recommendations for improvements. Requests included greater bullet lethality, newly built instead of rebuilt rifles, better-quality magazines, decreased weight, and a collapsible stock. Some users recommended shorter and lighter weapons such as the M4 carbine. Some issues have been addressed with the issuing of the Improved STANAG magazine in March 2009, and the M855A1 Enhanced Performance Round in June 2010.

In early 2010, two journalists from The New York Times spent three months with soldiers and Marines in Afghanistan. While there, they questioned around 100 infantry troops about the reliability of their M16 rifles, as well as the M4 carbine. The troops did not report reliability problems with their rifles. While only 100 troops were asked, they engaged in daily fighting in Marja, including at least a dozen intense engagements in Helmand Province, where the ground is covered in fine powdered sand (called "moon dust" by troops) that can stick to firearms. Weapons were often dusty, wet, and covered in mud. Intense firefights lasted hours with several magazines being expended. Only one soldier reported a jam when his M16 was covered in mud after climbing out of a canal. The weapon was cleared and resumed firing with the next chambered round. Furthermore, the Marine Chief Warrant Officer responsible for weapons training and performance of the Third Battalion, Sixth Marines, reported that "We've had nil in the way of problems; we've had no issues", with his battalion's 350 M16s and 700 M4s.

== Design ==
Video of Rifle 5.56mm, XM16E1, Operation and Cycle of Functioning

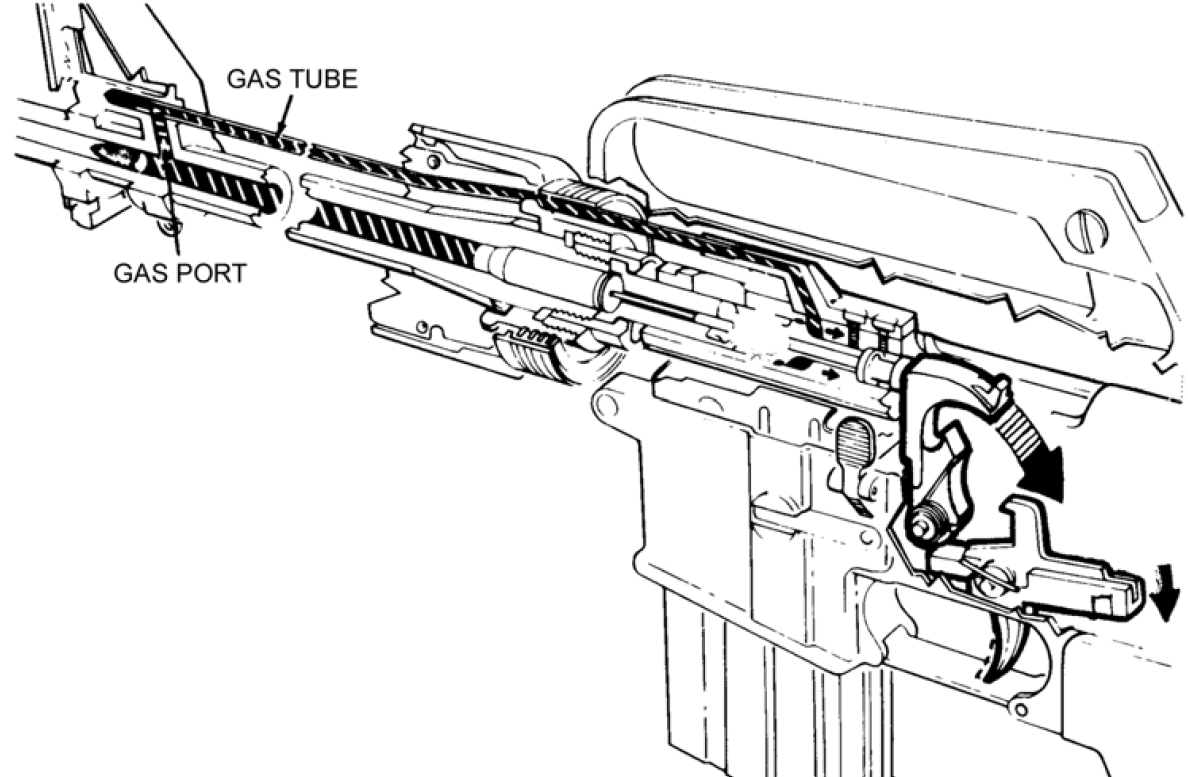
M16 internal piston action system

The M16 is a lightweight, 5.56 mm, air-cooled, gas-operated, magazine-fed assault rifle, with a rotating bolt. The M16's receivers are made of 7075 aluminum alloy, its barrel, bolt, and bolt carrier of steel, and its handguards, pistol grip, and buttstock of plastics.

The M16 internal piston action was derived from the original ArmaLite AR-10 and ArmaLite AR-15 actions. This internal piston action system designed by Eugene Stoner is commonly called a direct impingement system, but it does not use a conventional direct impingement system. In U.S. patent 2,951,424, the designer states: ″This invention is a true expanding gas system instead of the conventional impinging gas system.″ The gas system, bolt carrier, and bolt-locking design is ammunition specific, since it does not have an adjustable gas port or valve to adjust the weapon to various propellant and projectile or barrel length specific pressure behavior.

The M16A1 was especially lightweight at 7.9 pounds (3.6 kg) with a loaded 30-round magazine. This was significantly less than the M14 that it replaced at 10.7 pounds (4.9 kg) with a loaded 20-round magazine. It is also lighter when compared to the AKM's 8.3 pounds (3.8 kg) with a loaded 30-round magazine.

The M16A2 weighs 8.8 lb (4.0 kg) loaded with a 30-round magazine, because of the adoption of a thicker barrel profile. The thicker barrel is more resistant to damage when handled roughly and is also slower to overheat during sustained fire. Unlike a traditional "bull" barrel that is thick its entire length, the M16A2's barrel is only thick forward of the handguards. The barrel profile under the handguards remained the same as the M16A1 for compatibility with the M203 grenade launcher.

=== Barrel ===
Early model M16 barrels had a rifling twist of four grooves, right-hand twist, one turn in 14 inches (1:355.6 mm or 64 calibers) bore—as it was the same rifling as used by the .222 Remington sporting cartridge. After finding out that under unfavorable conditions, military bullets could yaw in flight at long ranges, the rifling was soon altered. Later M16 models and the M16A1 had an improved rifling with six grooves, right-hand twist, one turn in 12 inches (1:304.8 mm or 54.8 calibers) for increased accuracy and was optimized to adequately stabilize the M193 ball and M196 tracer bullets. M16A2 and current models are optimized for firing the heavier NATO SS109 ball and long L110 tracer bullets and have six grooves, right-hand twist, one turn in 7 in (1:177.8 mm or 32 calibers).

M193 ball and M196 tracer bullets may be fired in a rifle with a one turn in 7 in (1:177.8 mm or 32 calibers) twist barrel. NATO SS109 ball and L110 tracer bullets should only be used in emergency situations at ranges under 90 m (98 yd) with a one turn in 12 inches (1:304.8 mm or 54.8 calibers) twist, as this twist is insufficient to stabilize these projectiles. Weapons designed to adequately stabilize both the M193 or SS109 projectiles (like civilian market clones) usually have a six-groove, right-hand twist, one turn in 9 inches (1:228.6 mm or 41.1 calibers) or one turn in 8 inches (1:203.2 mm or 36.5 calibers) bore, although other and 1:7 inches twist rates are available as well.

=== Recoil ===
The (M16's) Stoner system provides a very symmetric design that allows straight-line movement of the operating components. This allows recoil forces to drive straight to the rear. Instead of connecting or other mechanical parts driving the system, high-pressure gas performs this function, reducing the weight of moving parts and the rifle as a whole.

The M16 uses a "straight-line" recoil design, where the recoil spring is located in the stock directly behind the action, and serves the dual function of operating spring and recoil buffer. The stock being in line with the bore also reduces muzzle rise, especially during automatic fire. Because recoil does not significantly shift the point of aim, faster follow-up shots are possible and user fatigue is reduced. In addition, current model M16 flash-suppressors also act as compensators to reduce recoil further.

Free recoil
	M16
Momentum	40.4 lb-ft/s
Velocity	5.1 ft/s (1.6 m/s)
Energy	3.2 ft⋅lb (4.3 J)

Notes: Free recoil is calculated by using the rifle weight, bullet weight, muzzle velocity, and charge weight. It is that which would be measured if the rifle were fired suspended from strings, free to recoil. A rifle's perceived recoil is also dependent on many other factors which are not readily quantified.

=== Sights ===
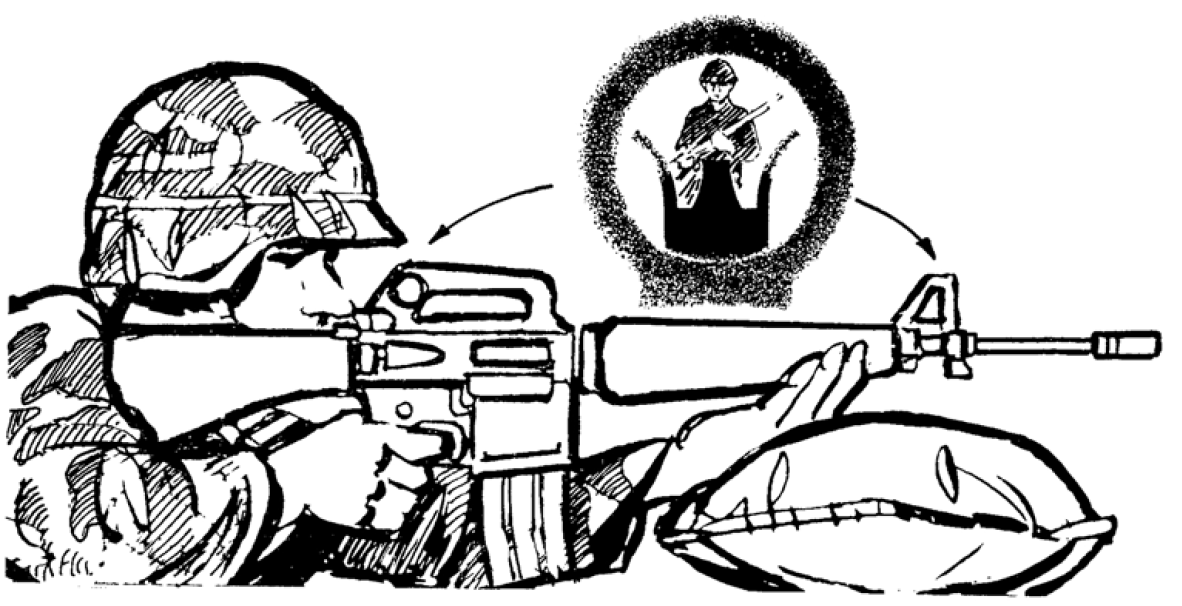
M16 sight picture when using the 0.070 in (1.78 mm) rear aperture

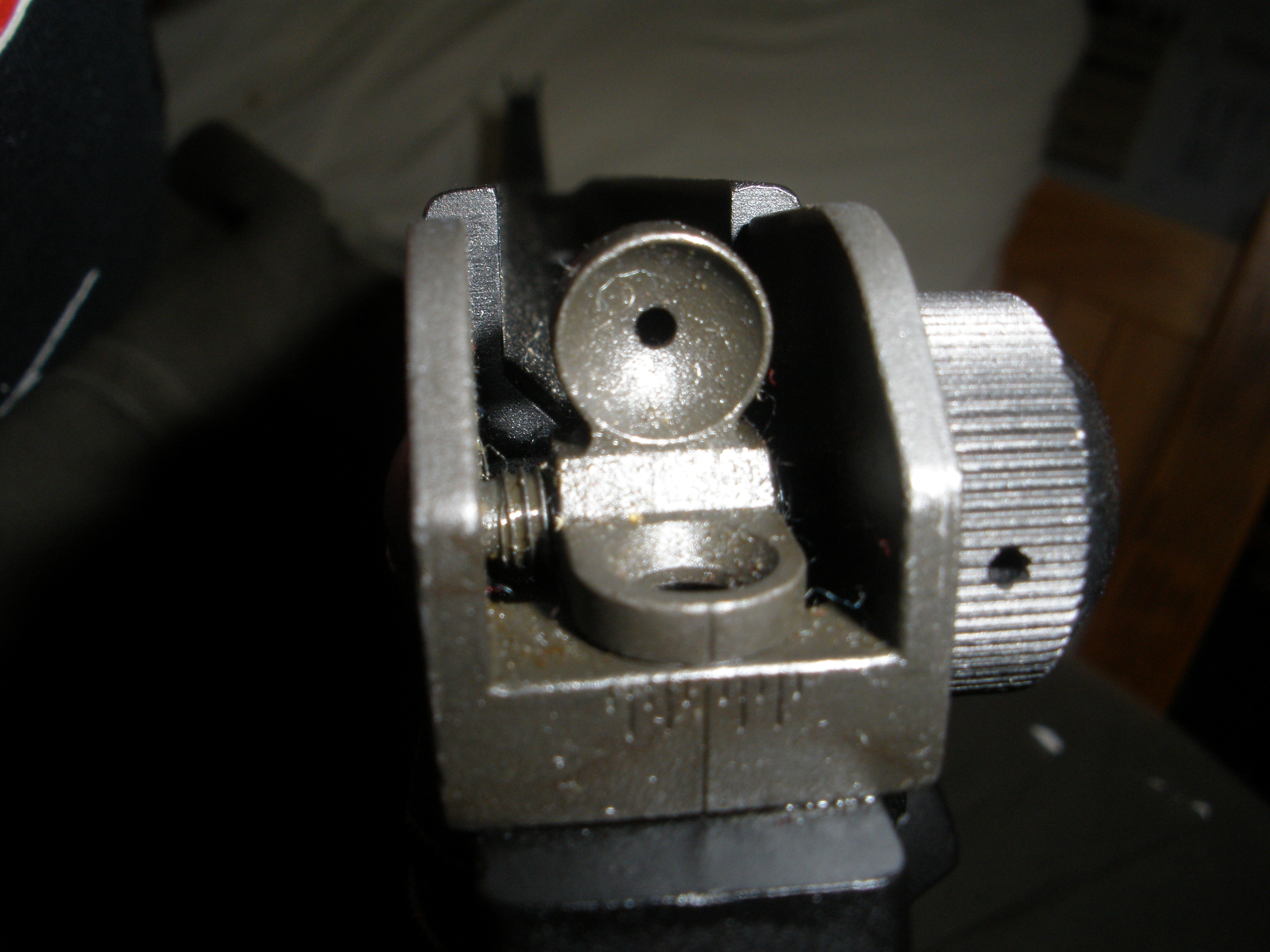
M16A2 with unmarked aperture rear sight for normal firing situations raised. The larger aperture, marked '0-2', is flipped down.

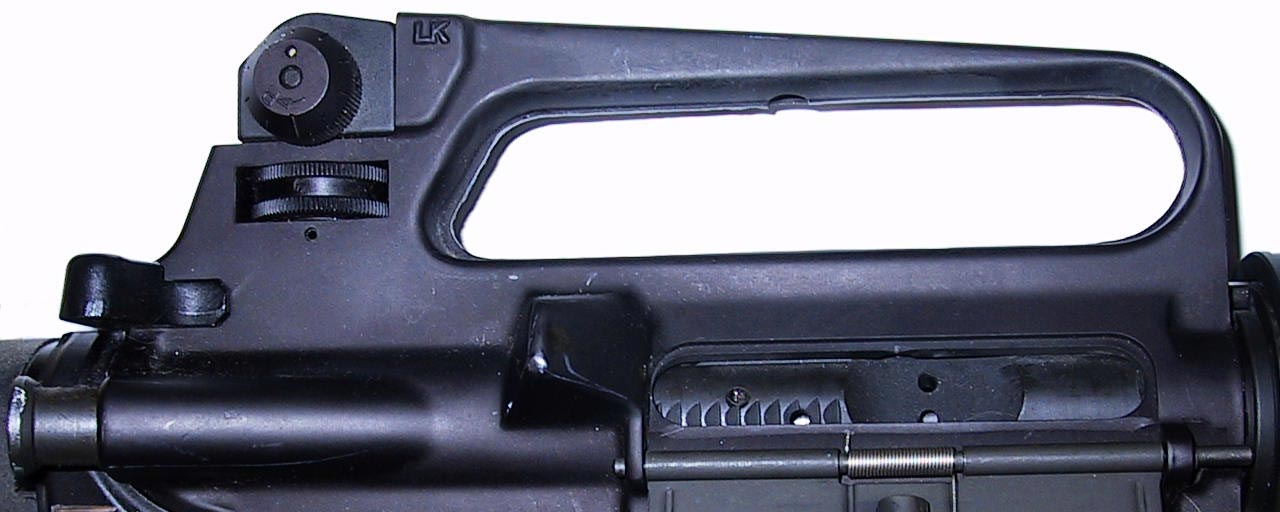
Fully adjustable rear sight, brass deflector and forward assist of the M16A2

The M16's most distinctive ergonomic feature is the carrying handle and rear sight assembly on top of the receiver. This is a by-product of the original AR-10 design, where the carrying handle contained a rear sight that could be set for specific range settings and also served to protect the charging handle. The M16 carry handle also provided mounting groove interfaces and a hole at the bottom of the handle groove for mounting a Colt 3×20 telescopic sight featuring a Bullet Drop Compensation elevation adjustment knob for ranges from 100 to 500 yd (91 to 457 m). This concurs with the pre-M16A2 maximum effective range of 460 m (503 yd). The Colt 3×20 telescopic sight was factory adjusted to be parallax-free at 200 yd (183 m). In Delft, the Netherlands Artillerie-Inrichtingen produced a roughly similar 3×25 telescopic sight for the carrying handle mounting interfaces.

The M16 elevated iron sight line has a 19.75 in (502 mm) sight radius. As the M16 series rear sight, front sight and sighting in targets designs were modified over time and non-iron sight (optical) aiming devices and new service ammunition were introduced zeroing procedures changed.

The standard pre-M16A2 "Daylight Sight System" uses an AR-15-style L-type flip, two aperture rear sight featuring two combat settings: short-range 0 to 300 m (0 to 328 yd) and long-range 300 to 400 m (328 to 437 yd), marked 'L'. The pre-M16A2 "Daylight Sight System" short-range and long-range zeros are 250 and 375 m (273 and 410 yd) with M193 ammunition. The rear sight features a windage drum that can be adjusted during zeroing with about 1 MOA increments. The front sight is a tapered round post of approximately 0.0625 in (1.59 mm) diameter adjustable during zeroing in about 1 MOA increments. A cartridge or tool is required to (re)zero the sight line.

An alternative pre-M16A2 "Low Light Level Sight System", includes a front sight post with a weak light source provided by tritium radioluminescence in an embedded small glass vial and a two aperture rear sight consisting of a 2 mm (0.079 in) diameter aperture marked 'L' intended for normal use out to 460 m (503 yd) and a 7 mm (0.276 in) diameter large aperture for night firing. Regulation stipulates the radioluminescent front sight post must be replaced if more than 144 months (12 years) elapsed after manufacture. The "Low Light Level Sight System" elevation and windage adjustment increments are somewhat coarser compared to the "Daylight Sight System".

With the advent of the M16A2, a less simple fully adjustable rear sight was added, allowing the rear sight to be dialed in with an elevation wheel for specific range settings between 300 and 800 m (328 and 875 yd) in 100 m increments and to allow windage adjustments with a windage knob without the need of a cartridge or tool. The unmarked approximately 0.070 in (1.78 mm) diameter aperture rear sight is for normal firing situations, zeroing and with the elevation knob for target distances up to 800 meters. The downsides of relatively small rear sight apertures are less light transmission through the aperture and a reduced field of view. A new larger approximately 0.2 in (5.08 mm) diameter aperture, marked '0-2' and featuring a windage setting index mark, offers a larger field of view during battle conditions and is used as a ghost ring for quick target engagement and during limited visibility. When flipped down, the engraved windage mark on top of the '0-2' aperture ring shows the dialed in windage setting on a windage scale at the rear of the rear sight assembly. When the normal use rear aperture sight is zeroed at 300 m with SS109/M855 ammunition, first used in the M16A2, the '0-2' rear sight will be zeroed for 200 m. The front sight post was widened to approximately 0.075 in (1.91 mm) diameter and became square and became adjustable during zeroing in about 1.2 MOA increments.

The M16A4 omitted the carrying handle and rear sight assembly on top of the receiver. Instead, it features a MIL-STD-1913 Picatinny railed flat-top upper receiver for mounting various optical sighting devices or a new detachable carrying handle and M16A2-style rear sight assembly. The current U.S. Army and Air Force issue M4A1 carbine comes with the M68 close combat optic and back-up iron sight. The U.S. Marine Corps uses the ACOG Rifle Combat Optic and the U.S. Navy uses the EOTech holographic weapon sight.

=== Range and accuracy ===
The M16 rifle is considered to be very accurate for a service rifle. Its light recoil, high-velocity and flat trajectory allow shooters to take headshots out to 300 meters. Newer M16s use the newer M855 cartridge increasing their effective range to 600 meters. They are more accurate than their predecessors and are capable of shooting 1–3-inch groups at 100 yards. (Note: Per Taylor "From an accuracy standpoint, there is no comparison between the M16 and AK. As long as the upper and lower receivers are tight and the trigger is halfway decent, the M16 is capable of MOA accuracy, whereas a typical AK will produce 5 to 6 MOA at best. And, if a free-floated barrel is incorporated to the M16's design, it becomes capable of 1/2-MOA or better, making it fully as accurate as a finely tuned heavy-barreled bolt-action precision rifle.") "In Fallujah, Iraq, Marines with ACOG-equipped M16A4s created a stir by taking so many headshots that until the wounds were closely examined, some observers thought the insurgents had been executed." The newest M855A1 EPR cartridge is even more accurate and during testing "has shown that, on average, 95 percent of the rounds will hit within an 8 × 8-inch (20.3 × 20.3 cm) target at 600 meters".

Rifle	Caliber	Cartridge	Cartridge weight	Bullet weight	Velocity	Energy	Range				Accuracy	
Rifle	Caliber	Cartridge	Cartridge weight	Bullet weight	Velocity	Energy	Effective (Note: The effective range of a firearm is the maximum distance at which a weapon may be expected to be accurate and achieve the desired effect.)	Horizontal (Note: The horizontal range is the distance traveled by a bullet, fired from the rifle at a height of 1.6 meters and 0° elevation, until the bullet hits the ground.)	Lethal (Note: The lethal range is the maximum range of a small-arms projectile, while still maintaining the minimum energy required to put unprotected personnel out of action, which is generally believed to be 15 kilogram-meters (147 J / 108 ft.lbf). This is the equivalent of the muzzle energy of a .22LR handgun.)	Maximum (Note: The maximum range of a small-arms projectile is attained at about 30° elevation. This maximum range is only of safety interest, not for combat firing.)	10 shot group @ 100 meters	10 shot group @ 300 meters
M16	5.56×45 mm Remington	M193	184 gr (11.9 g)	55 gr (3.6 g)	3,250 fps (990 m/s)	1,302 ft/lb (1,764 J)	500 yds (460 m)	711 yds (650 m)	984 yds (900 m)	3000 yds (2700 m)	4.3 in (11 cm)	12.6 in (32 cm) (Note: Taken from the long-range dispersion firing test of the AK-47 assault rifle, U.S. Army Foreign Science and Technology Center. August 1969. "Just how mediocre? Two decades later, the U.S. Army would hold long-range firing tests with Kalashnikov variants, including three Soviet, two Chinese, and a Romanian model. At 300 meters, expert shooters at prone or bench rest positions had difficulty putting ten consecutive rounds on target. The testers then had the weapons fired from a cradle by a machine, which removed human error. At 300 meters, the ten-rounds group fired in this manner had a minimum dispersion of 17.5 inches, compared to the 12.6 inches with an M-16, the American assault rifle fielded in Vietnam as a reaction to the Kalashnikov's spread.)

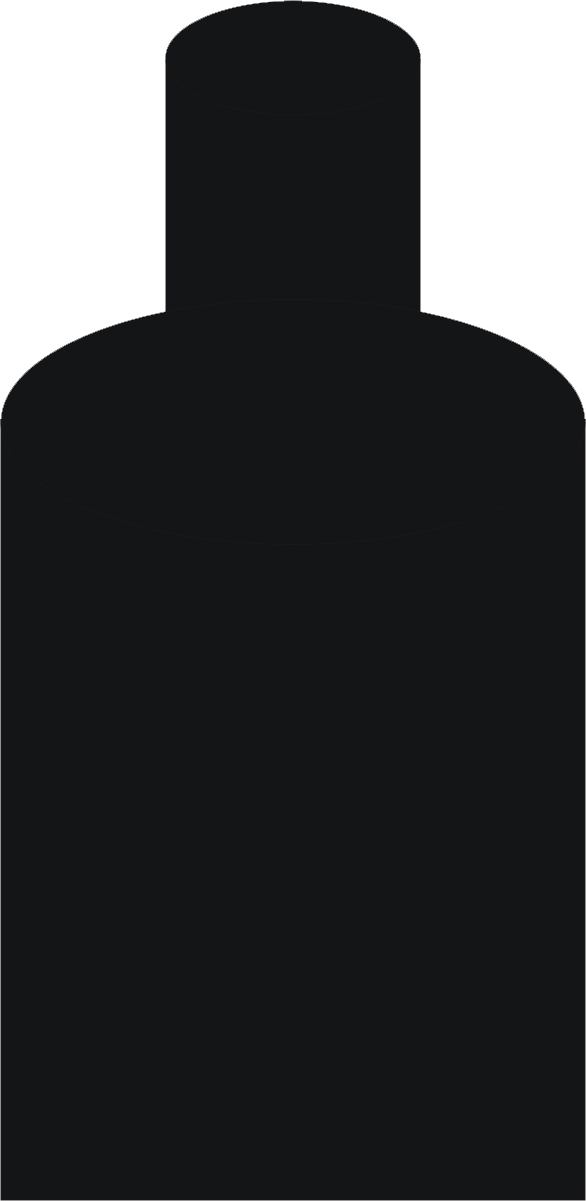
NATO E-type silhouette target

Single-shot hit-probability on crouching man (NATO E-type silhouette) target
Rifle	Chambering	Hit-probability (with no range estimation or aiming errors)								
Rifle	Chambering	50 meters	100 meters	200 meters	300 meters	400 meters	500 meters	600 meters	700 meters	800 meters
M16A1 (1967)	5.56×45 mm Remington M193	100%	100%	100%	100%	96%	87%	73%	56%	39%
M16A2 (1982)	5.56×45 mm NATO SS109/M855	100%	100%	100%	100%	98%	90%	79%	63%	43%

=== Terminal ballistics ===
The 5.56×45mm cartridge had several advantages over the 7.62×51mm NATO round used in the M14 rifle. It enabled each soldier to carry more ammunition and was easier to control during automatic or burst fire. The 5.56×45mm cartridge can also produce massive wounding effects when the bullet impacts at high speed and yaws ("tumbles") in tissue leading to fragmentation and rapid transfer of energy.

Rifle	Caliber	Cartridge	Penetration						
Rifle	Caliber	Cartridge	Ballistic gelatin @ 10 meters	Sandbags @ 100 meters	3/4" pine boards @ 100 meters	Concrete building block (one center rib)	Steel helmet	1.9mm steel (14 gauge) @ 100 meters	4mm steel (8 gauge) + layers of Kevlar-29
M16	5.56×45 mm Remington	M193	≈14 in (36 cm) (bullet fragments into smaller pieces)	4 in (10 cm) (complete bullet disintegration)	8 boards (bullet tumbled)	one side to 200 m	both sides to 300 m one side to 500 m	2 layers	31 layers of Kevlar

Wound profiles in ballistic gelatin
Note: images are not to same scale

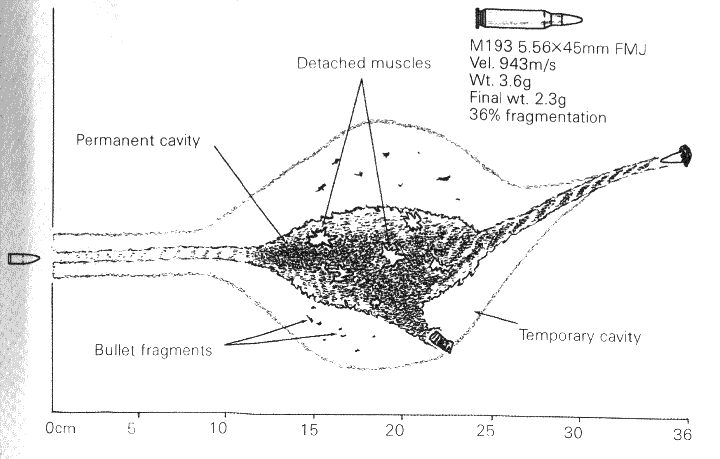
M16 M193 5.56×45 mm Remington

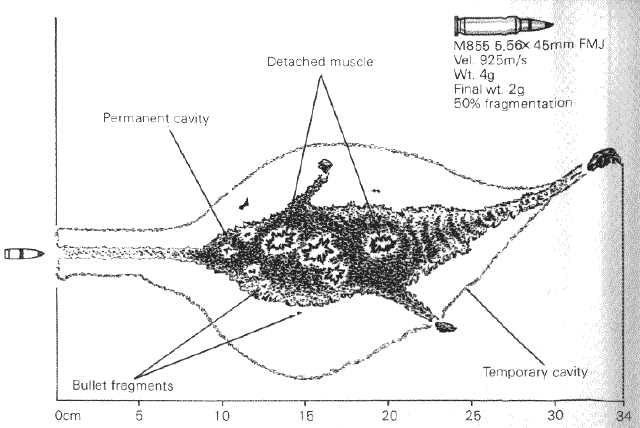
M16A2 SS109/M855 5.56×45 mm NATO

The original ammunition for the M16 was the 55-grain 5.56x45mm Remington M193 cartridge. When fired from a 20 in (510 mm) barrel at ranges of up to 300 feet (100 m), the thin-jacketed lead-cored round traveled fast enough (above 2,900 ft/s (880 m/s)) that the force of striking a human body would cause the round to yaw (or tumble) and fragment into about a dozen pieces of various sizes thus created wounds that were out of proportion to its caliber. These wounds were so devastating that many considered the M16 to be an inhumane weapon. (Note: Those who consider the M16 inhumane include; the International Committee of the Red Cross, Austria, Argentina, Belgium, Bolivia, Bulgaria, Burundi, Cambodia, Cyprus, Germany, Ireland, Latvia, Lithuania, Luxembourg, Mauritius, Mexico, Romania, Samoa, Slovenia, Sweden, Switzerland, etc.)As the 5.56 mm round's velocity decreases, so does the number of fragments that it produces. The 5.56 mm round does not normally fragment at distances beyond 200 meters or at velocities below 2500 ft/s, and its lethality becomes largely dependent on shot placement.

With the development of the M16A2, the new 62-grain M855 cartridge was adopted in 1983. The heavier bullet had more energy and was made with a steel core to penetrate Soviet body armor. However, this caused less fragmentation on impact and reduced effects against targets without armor, both of which lessened kinetic energy transfer and wounding ability. Some soldiers and Marines coped with this through training, with requirements to shoot vital areas three times to guarantee killing the target.

However, there have been repeated and consistent reports of the M855's inability to wound effectively (i.e., fragment) when fired from the short barreled M4 carbine (even at close ranges). The M4's 14.5-in. barrel length reduces muzzle velocity to about 2900 ft/s. This reduced wounding ability is one reason that, despite the Army's transition to short-barrel M4s, the Marine Corps has decided to continue using the M16A4 with its 20-inch barrel as the 5.56×45mm NATO M855 is largely dependent upon high velocity in order to wound effectively.

In 2003, the U.S. Army contended that the lack of lethality of the 5.56×45mm NATO was more a matter of perception than fact. With good shot placement to the head and chest, the target was usually defeated without issue. The majority of failures were the result of hitting the target in non-vital areas such as extremities. However, a minority of failures occurred in spite of multiple hits to the chest. In 2006, a study found that 20% of soldiers using the M4 carbine wanted more lethality or stopping power. In June 2010, the U.S. Army announced it began shipping its new 5.56 mm NATO, lead-free, M855A1 Enhanced Performance Round to active combat zones. This upgrade is designed to maximize performance of the 5.56×45mm NATO round, to extend range, improve accuracy, increase penetration and to consistently fragment in soft-tissue when fired from not only standard length M16s, but also the short-barreled M4 carbines. The U.S. Army has been impressed with the new M855A1 EPR round. A 7.62 NATO M80A1 EPR variant was also developed.

=== Magazines ===
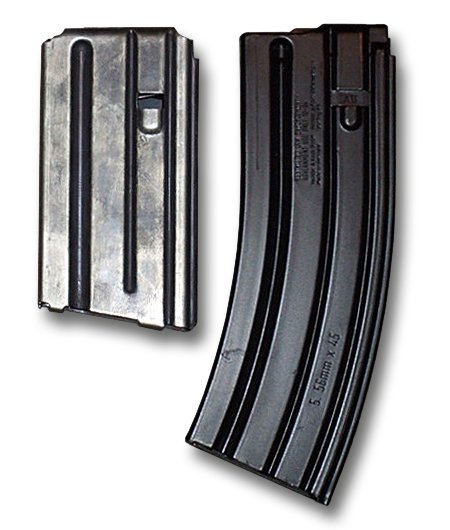
Vietnam War-era 20-round magazine (left) and current issue NATO STANAG 30-round magazine (right)

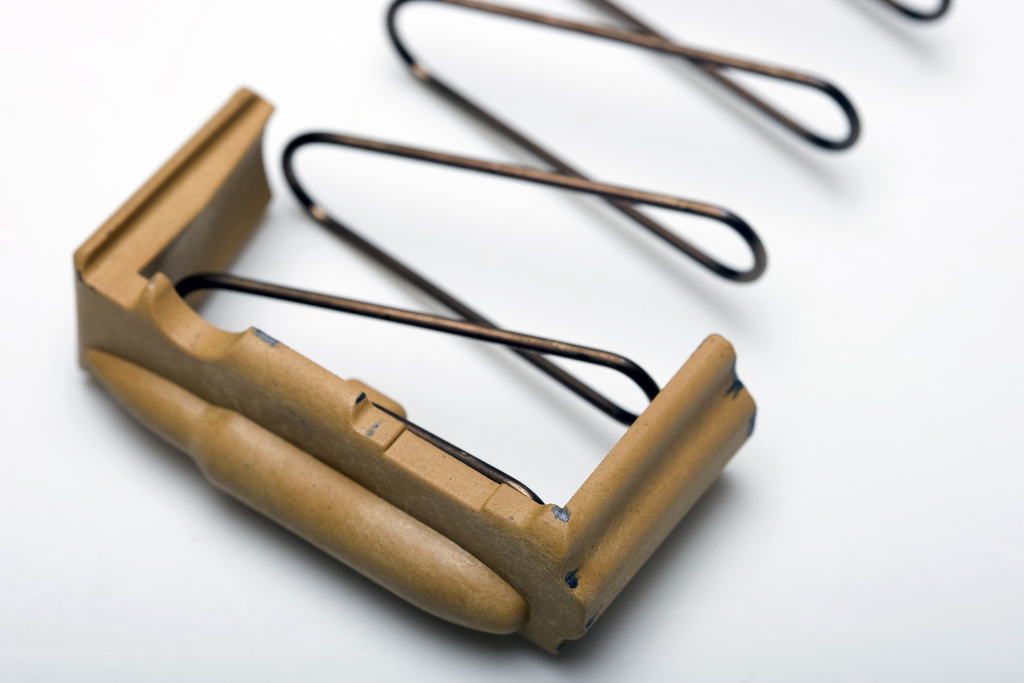
Improved tan colored M16 magazine follower

The M16's magazine was meant to be a lightweight, disposable item. As such, it is made of pressed/stamped aluminum and was not designed to be durable. The M16 originally used a 20-round magazine which was later replaced by a bent 30-round design. As a result, the magazine follower tends to rock or tilt, causing malfunctions. Many non-U.S. and commercial magazines have been developed to effectively mitigate these shortcomings, e.g., Heckler & Koch's all-stainless-steel "High-Reliability" magazine, Magpul's polymer P-MAG and E-MAG, etc.

Production of the 30-round magazine started late 1967 but did not fully replace the 20-round magazine until the mid-1970s. Standard USGI aluminum 30-round M16 magazines weigh 0.24 lb (0.11 kg) empty and are 7.1 inches (18 cm) long. (Note: Per Surefire" "Standard MILSPEC USGI 30-Round Magazine Specs: Height: 7.1" and Weight-Empty: 3.9 ounces") The newer plastic magazines are about a half-inch longer. The newer steel magazines are about 0.5-inch longer and four ounces heavier. The M16's magazine has become the unofficial NATO STANAG magazine and is currently used by many Western nations, in numerous weapon systems.

In 2009, the U.S. military began fielding an "improved magazine" identified by a tan-colored follower. "The new follower incorporates an extended rear leg and modified bullet protrusion for improved round stacking and orientation. The self-leveling/anti-tilt follower minimizes jamming while a wider spring coil profile creates even force distribution. The performance gains have not added weight or cost to the magazines."

In July 2016, the U.S. Army introduced another improvement, the new Enhanced Performance Magazine, which it says will result in a 300% increase in reliability in the M4 carbine. Developed by the United States Army Armament Research, Development and Engineering Center and the Army Research Laboratory in 2013, it is tan colored with blue follower to distinguish it from earlier, incompatible magazines.

=== Muzzle devices ===
Most M16 rifles have a barrel threaded in 1/2-28" threads to incorporate the use of a muzzle device such as a flash suppressor or sound suppressor. The initial flash suppressor design had three tines or prongs and was designed to preserve the shooter's night vision by disrupting the flash. Unfortunately it was prone to breakage and getting entangled in vegetation. The design was later changed to close the end to avoid this and became known as the "A1" or "bird cage" flash suppressor on the M16A1. Eventually on the M16A2 version of the rifle, the bottom port was closed to reduce muzzle climb and prevent dust from rising when the rifle was fired in the prone position. For these reasons, the U.S. military declared the A2 flash suppressor as a compensator or a muzzle brake; but it is more commonly known as the "GI" or "A2" flash suppressor.

The M16's Vortex Flash Hider weighs 3 ounces, is 2.25 inches long, and does not require a lock washer to attach to the barrel. It was developed in 1984 and is one of the earliest privately designed muzzle devices. The U.S. military uses the Vortex Flash Hider on M4 carbines and M16 rifles. (Note: NATO Stock Number of NSN 1005-01-591-5825, PN 1001V) A version of the Vortex has been adopted by the Canadian Military for the Colt Canada C8 CQB rifle. Other flash suppressors developed for the M16 include the Phantom Flash Suppressor by Yankee Hill Machine (YHM) and the KX-3 by Noveske Rifleworks.

The threaded barrel allows sound suppressors with the same thread pattern to be installed directly to the barrel; however this can result in complications such as being unable to remove the suppressor from the barrel due to repeated firing on full auto or three-round burst. A number of suppressor manufacturers have designed "direct-connect" sound suppressors which can be installed over an existing M16's flash suppressor as opposed to using the barrel's threads.

=== Grenade launchers and shotguns ===
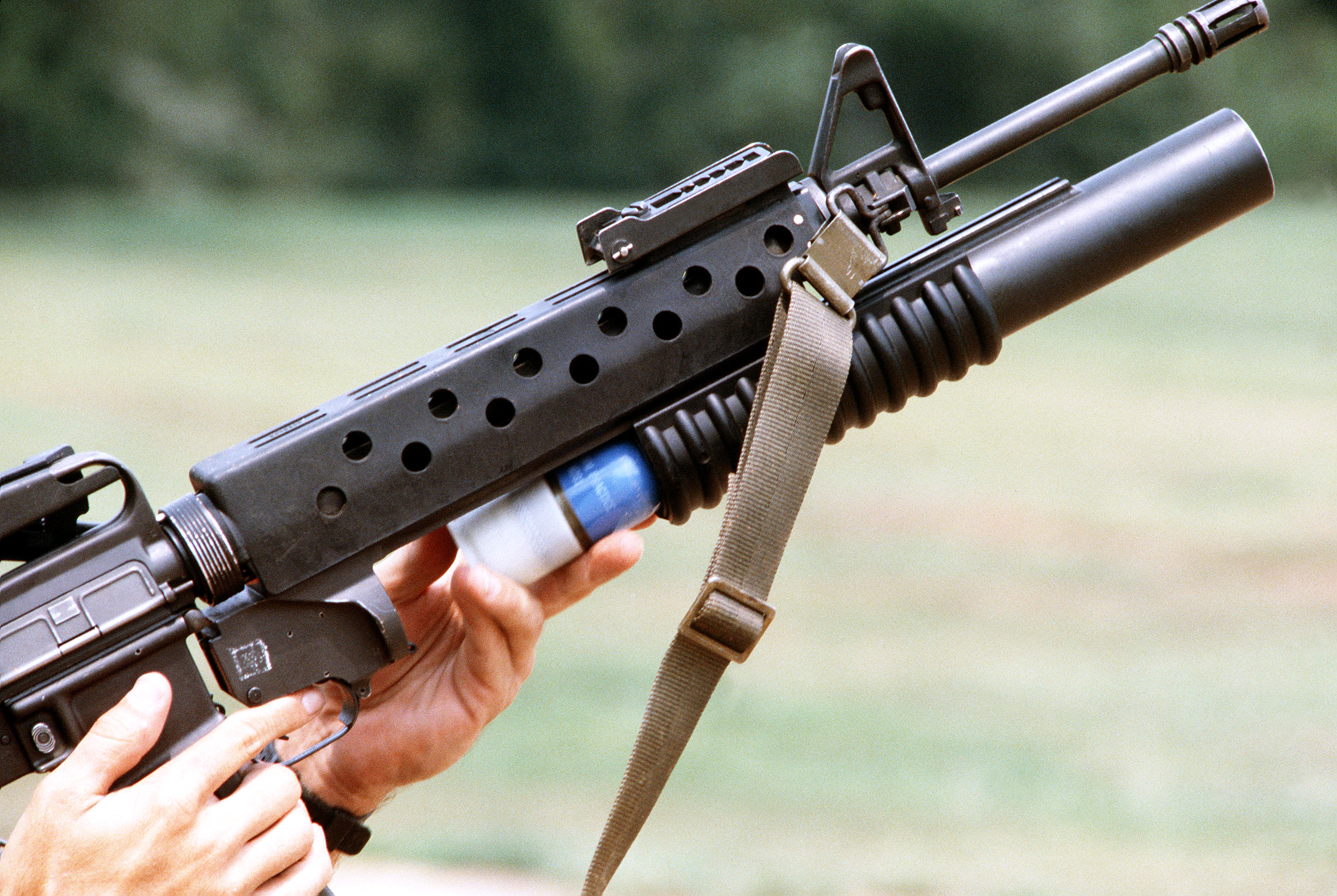
Loading an M203 40 mm grenade launcher attached to an M16A1 rifle with a practice round

All current M16-type rifles can mount under-barrel 40 mm grenade launchers, such as the M203 and M320. Both use the same 40×46mm LV grenades as the older, stand-alone M79 grenade launcher. The M16 can also mount under-barrel 12 gauge shotguns such as KAC Masterkey or the M26 Modular Accessory Shotgun System.

=== M234 launcher ===
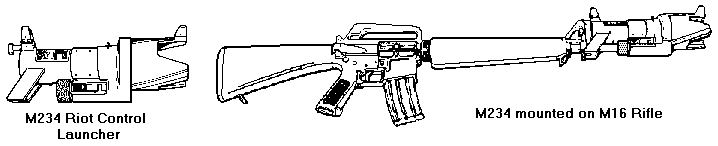
M234 riot control launcher

The M234 riot control launcher is an M16-series rifle attachment firing an M755 blank round. The M234 mounts on the muzzle, bayonet lug, and front sight post of the M16. It fires either the M734 64 mm kinetic riot control or the M742 64 mm CSI riot control ring airfoil projectiles. The latter produces a 4 to 5-foot tear gas cloud on impact. The main advantage to using ring airfoil projectiles is that their design does not allow them to be thrown back by rioters with any real effect. The M234 is no longer used by U.S. forces. It has been replaced by the M203 grenade launcher and nonlethal ammunition.

=== Bayonet ===
The M16 is 44.25 inches (1,124 mm) long with an M7 bayonet attached. The M7 bayonet is based on earlier designs such as the M4, M5, & M6 bayonets, all of which are direct descendants of the M3 fighting knife and have spear-point blade with a half sharpened secondary edge. The newer M9 bayonet has a clip-point blade with saw teeth along the spine and can be used as a multi-purpose knife and wire-cutter when combined with its scabbard. The current USMC OKC-3S bayonet bears a resemblance to the Marines' iconic Ka-Bar fighting knife with serrations near the handle.

=== Bipod ===
For use as an ad-hoc automatic rifle, the M16 and M16A1 could be equipped with the XM3 bipod, later standardized as the Bipod, M3 (1966) and Rifle Bipod M3 (1983). Weighing only 0.6 lb, the simple and non-adjustable bipod clamps to the barrel of the rifle to allow for supported fire.

== NATO standards ==
In March 1970, the U.S. recommended that all NATO forces adopt the 5.56×45mm Remington cartridge. This shift represented a change in the philosophy of the military's long-held position about caliber size. By the mid-1970s, other armies were looking at M16-style weapons. A NATO standardization effort soon started and tests of various rounds were carried out starting in 1977. The U.S. offered the 5.56×45mm M193 round, but there were concerns about its penetration in the face of the wider introduction of body armor. In the end, the Belgian 5.56×45mm SS109 round was chosen (STANAG 4172) in October 1980. The SS109 round was based on the U.S. cartridge but included a new stronger, heavier, 62-grain bullet design, with better long-range performance and improved penetration (specifically, to consistently penetrate the side of a steel helmet at 600 meters). Due to its design and lower muzzle velocity (about 3110 ft/s) the Belgian SS109 round is considered more humane because it is less likely to fragment than the U.S. M193 round. The 5.56×45mm NATO standard ammunition produced for U.S. forces is designated M855.

In October 1980, shortly after NATO accepted the 5.56×45mm NATO rifle cartridge. Draft Standardization Agreement 4179 (STANAG 4179) was proposed to allow NATO members to easily share rifle ammunition and magazines down to the individual soldier level. The magazine chosen to become the STANAG magazine was originally designed for the U.S. M16 rifle. Many NATO member nations, but not all, subsequently developed or purchased rifles with the ability to accept this type of magazine. However, the standard was never ratified and remains a 'Draft STANAG'.

All current M16 type rifles are designed to fire STANAG 22 mm rifle grenades from their integral flash hiders without the use of an adapter. These 22 mm grenade types range from anti-tank rounds to simple finned tubes with a fragmentation hand grenade attached to the end. They come in the "standard" type which are propelled by a blank cartridge inserted into the chamber of the rifle. They also come in the "bullet trap" and "shoot through" types, as their names imply, they use live ammunition. The U.S. military does not generally use rifle grenades; however, they are used by other nations.

The NATO Accessory Rail STANAG 4694, or Picatinny rail STANAG 2324, or a "Tactical Rail" is a bracket used on M16 type rifles to provide a standardized mounting platform. The rail comprises a series of ridges with a T-shaped cross-section interspersed with flat "spacing slots". Scopes are mounted either by sliding them on from one end or the other; by means of a "rail-grabber" which is clamped to the rail with bolts, thumbscrews or levers; or onto the slots between the raised sections. The rail was originally for scopes. However, once established, the use of the system was expanded to other accessories, such as tactical lights, laser aiming modules, night vision devices, reflex sights, foregrips, bipods, and bayonets.

The M16 is in use by 15 NATO countries and more than 80 countries worldwide as of 2019.

== Variants ==
=== M16 ===
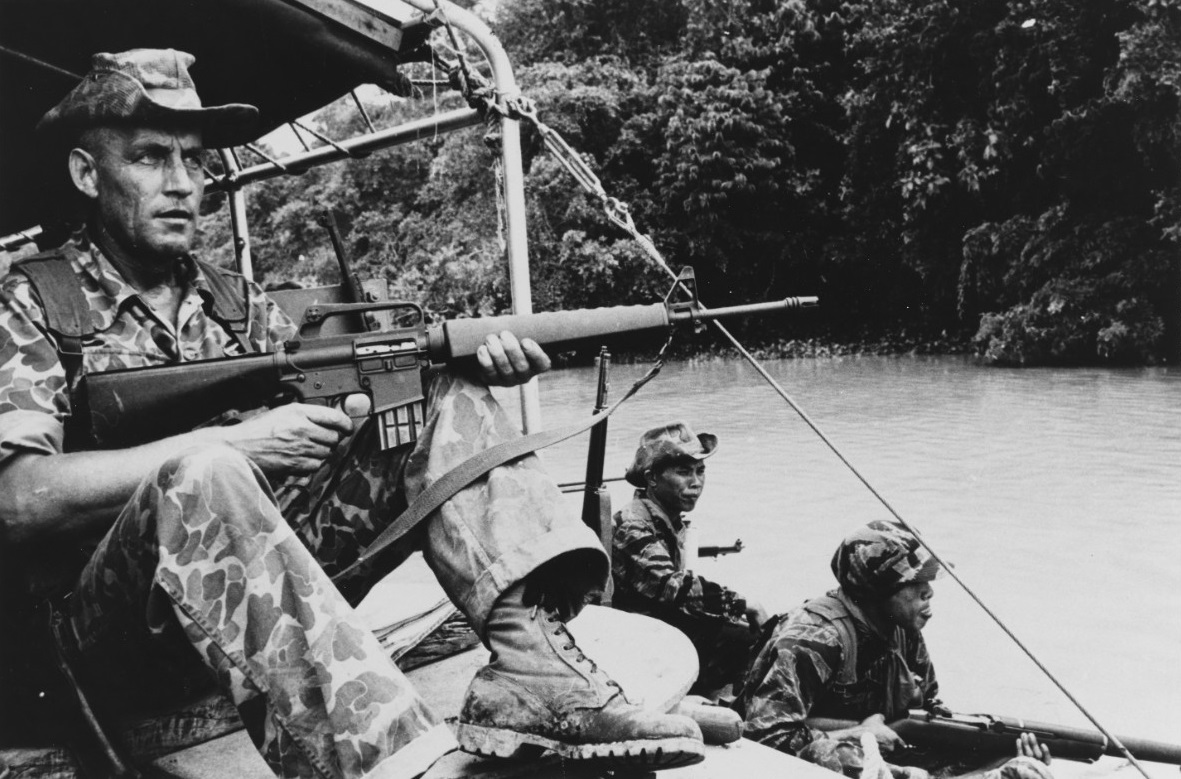
An early M16 rifle without forward-assist. Note: "duckbill" flash suppressor and triangular handguard.

This was the first M16 variant adopted operationally, originally by the U.S. Air Force. It was equipped with triangular handguards, buttstocks without a compartment for the storage of a cleaning kit, a three-pronged "duckbill" flash suppressor designed to preserve the shooter's night vision by disrupting the flash, full auto, and no forward assist. The M16 has a safe/semi/auto selective fire trigger group. Bolt carriers were originally chrome plated and slick-sided, lacking forward assist notches. Later, the chrome-plated carriers were dropped in favor of Army-issued notched and parkerized carriers, though the interior portion of the bolt carrier is still chrome-lined. The barrel rifling had a 1:12 (305 mm) twist rate to adequately stabilize the M193 ball and M196 tracer ammunition. The Air Force continued to operate these weapons until around 2001, at which time the Air Force converted all of its M16s to the M16A2 configuration.

The M16 was also adopted by the British SAS, who used it during the Falklands War.

=== XM16E1 and M16A1 (Colt Model 603) ===
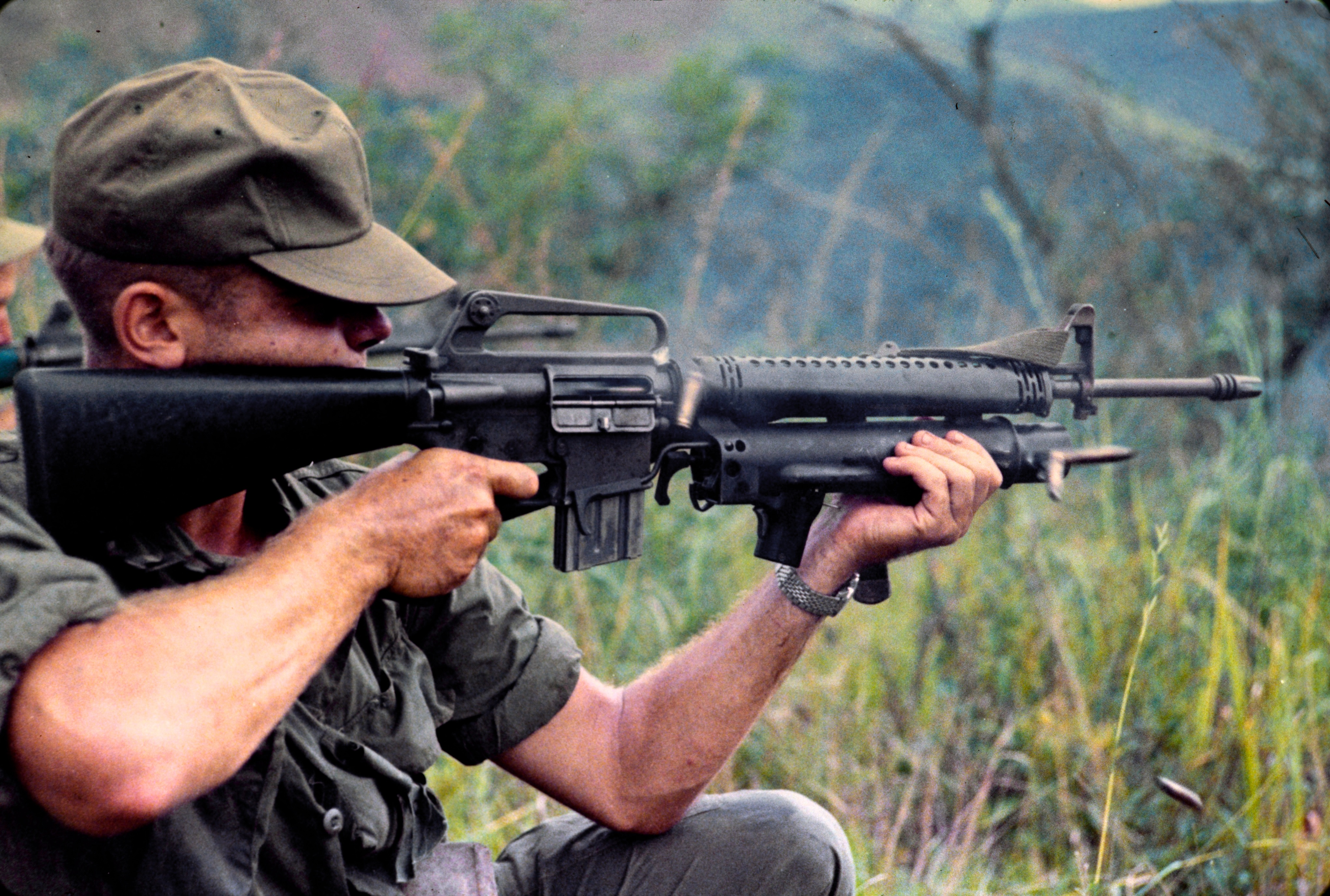
XM16E1 with XM148 grenade launcher

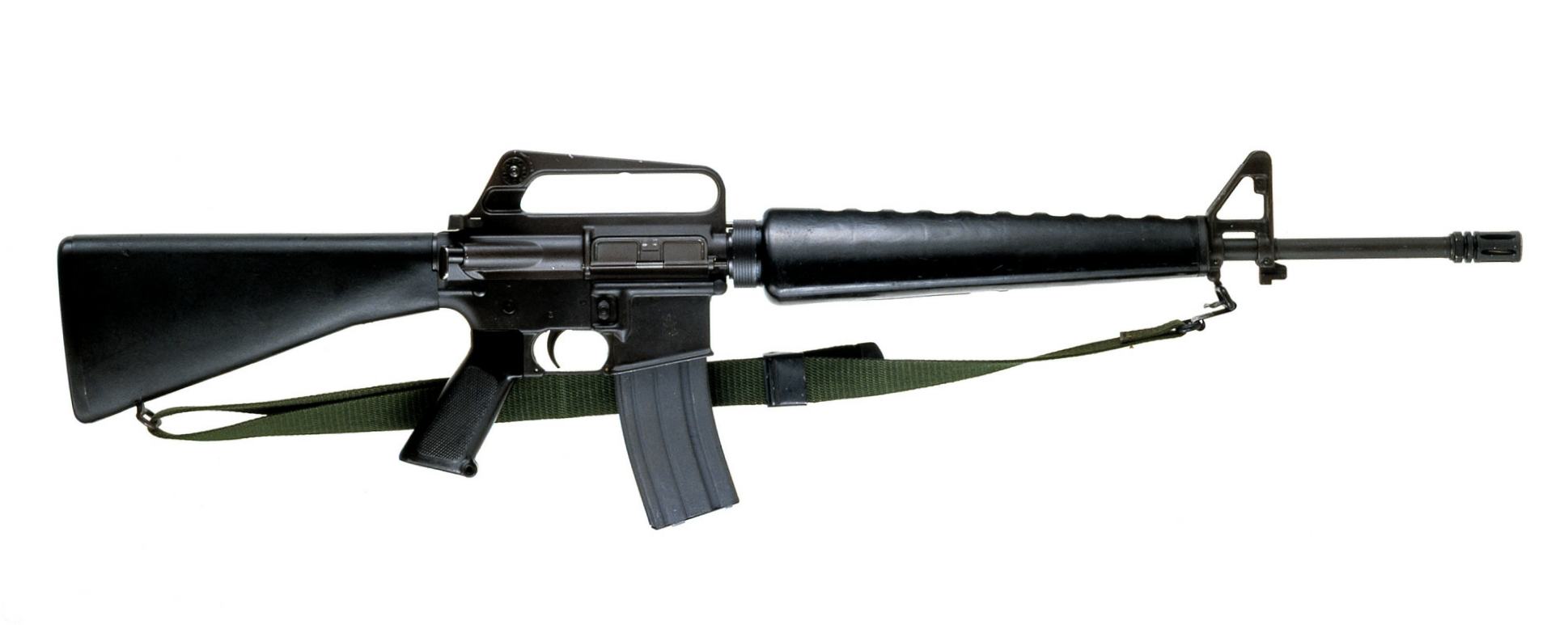
M16A1 rifle with 30-round magazine

The U.S. Army XM16E1 was essentially the same weapon as the M16 with the addition of a forward assist and corresponding notches in the chrome bolt carrier. A rib was built into the side of the receiver to help prevent accidental pressing of the magazine release button while closing the ejection port cover.

The M16A1 was the finalized production model and was produced from February 1967 until 1982. To address issues with the XM16E1, for the M16A1 a closed, birdcage symmetric flash suppressor with open side slots to the top, bottom, left and right replaced the XM16E1's three-pronged flash suppressor, which caught on twigs and leaves, from 1967 onwards. Various other changes were made after numerous problems in the field. Cleaning kits were developed and issued, while barrels with chrome-plated chambers and later fully lined bores were introduced. A small storage compartment inside the stock was introduced. Covered by a trapdoor with checkered anti-slip texturing, it is often used for storing a basic cleaning kit. To promote reliability and durability, the mechanical behavior of the operating system was revised to make it compatible for using US military issued ammunition loaded with WC846 ball powder (which reaches peak pressure significantly quicker than the extruded IMR8208M powder and increases the cyclic rate of fire for which the operating system was originally designed). Revisions like reducing the diameter of the gas port to mitigate the higher port pressure caused by the ball powder to properly gas the operating system again, updating the buffer assembly, changing the bolt carrier surface finish to manganese phosphate and the gas tube material to stainless steel contributed to improved mechanical behavior.

The rib was extended on production M16A1s to help in preventing the magazine release from inadvertently being pressed. The hole in the bolt that accepts the cam pin was crimped inward on one side, in such a way that the cam pin may not be inserted with the bolt installed backwards, which would cause failures to eject until corrected. With these and other changes, the malfunction rate slowly declined, and new soldiers were generally unfamiliar with early problems.

The M16A1 saw limited use in training capacities until the early 2000s, but is no longer in active service with the U.S., although is still standard issue in many world armies.

=== M16A2 ===
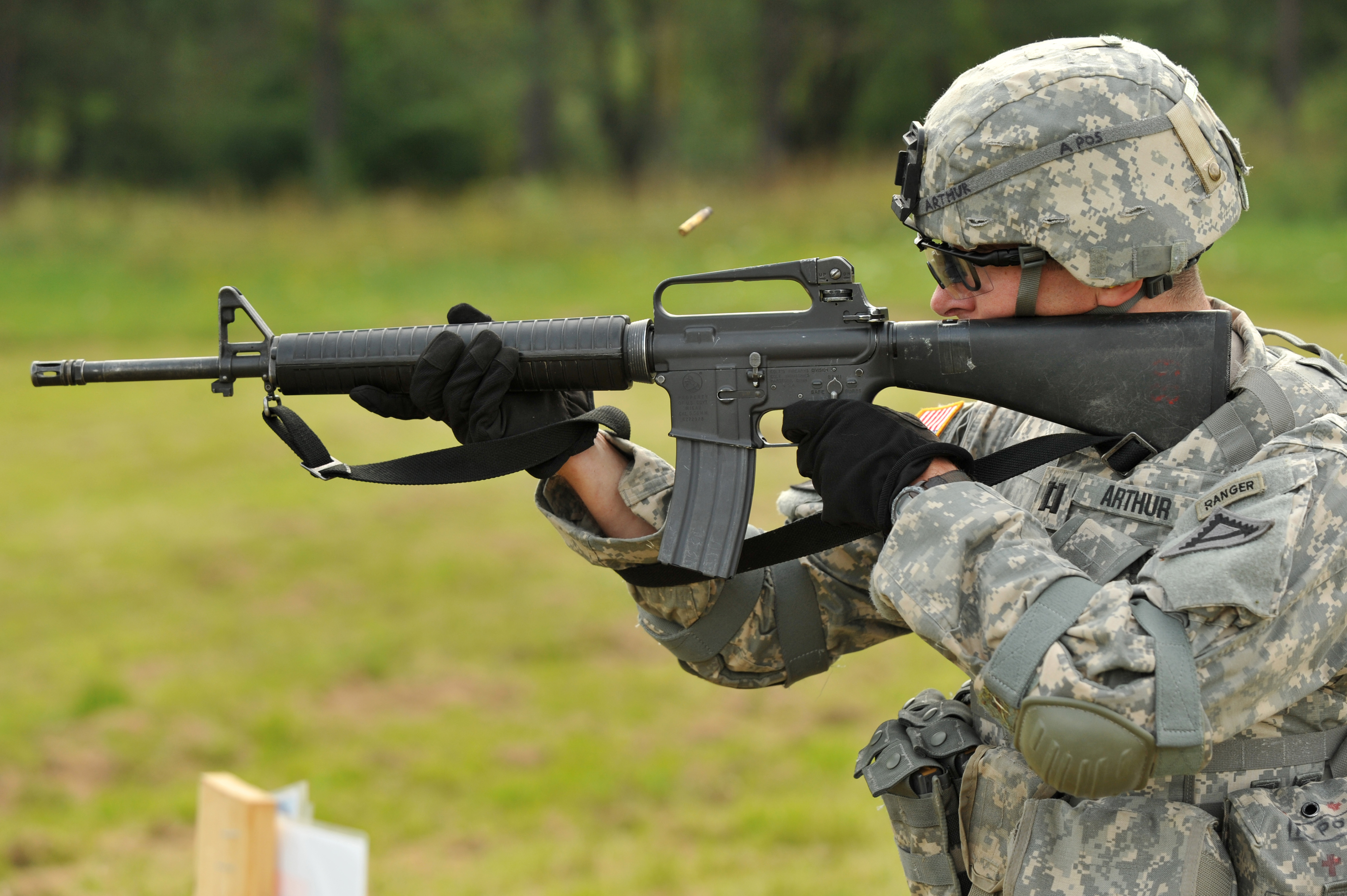
Spent case being deflected after firing an M16A2 (Model 705 with Safe/Semi/Burst trigger group) by a left-handed user

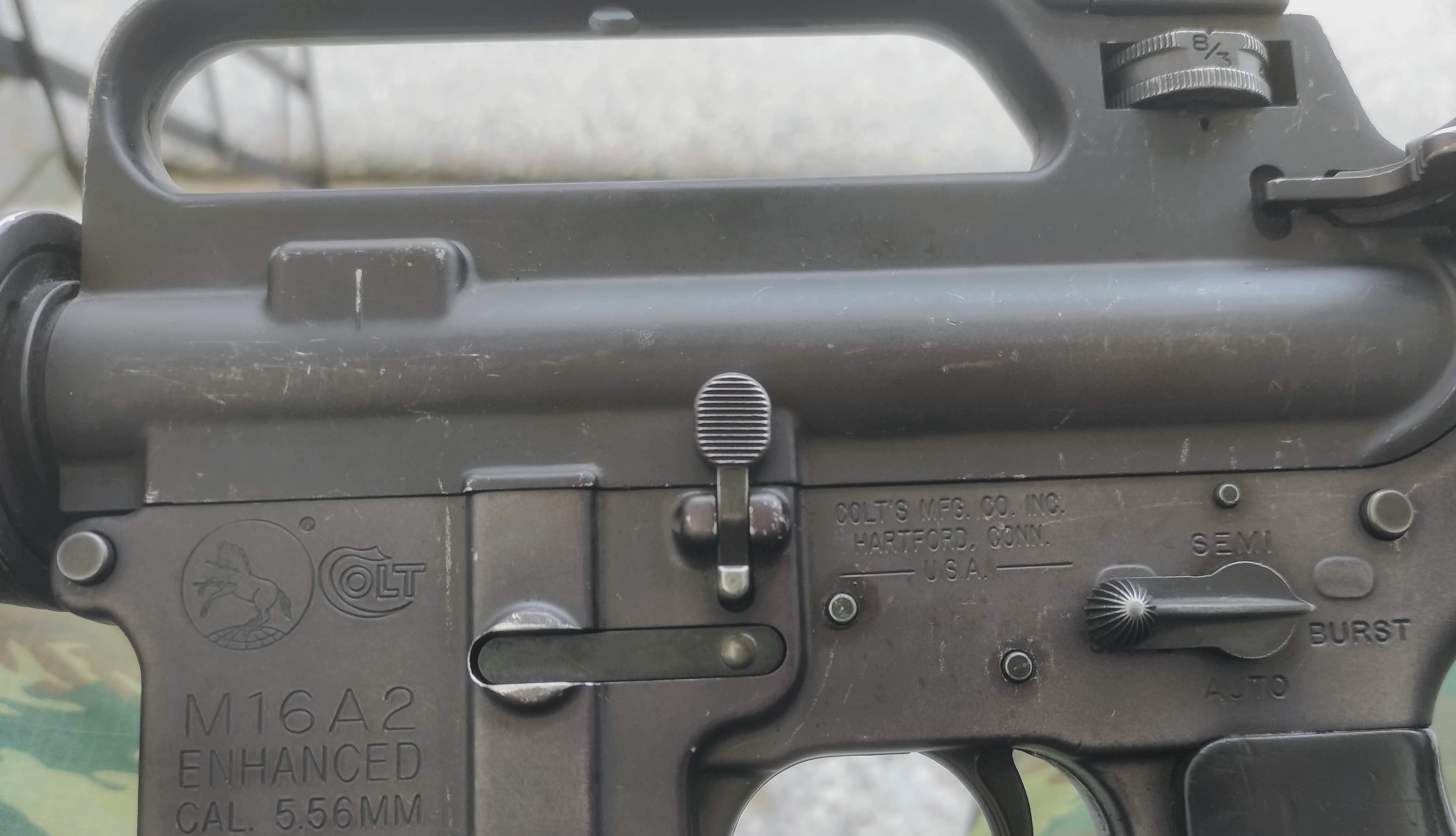
M16A2 Enhanced rifle (Model 708 with Safe/Semi/Burst/Auto trigger group)

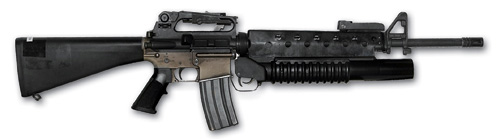
M16A2 with a heat shield hand guard and an M203 grenade launcher under it. Also note that it has an XM16E1 lower receiver.

Flag of the Gambia National Army with two crossed M16A2

The development of the M16A2 rifle was originally requested by the United States Marine Corps in 1979 as a result of combat experience in Vietnam with the M16A1. It was officially adopted by the Department of Defense as the "Rifle, 5.56 mm, M16A2" in 1983. The Marines were the first branch of the U.S. Armed Forces to adopt it, in the early/mid-1980s, with the United States Army following suit in 1986.

Modifications to the M16A2 were extensive. In addition to the then-new STANAG 4172 5.56×45mm NATO chambering and its accompanying rifling, the barrel was made with a greater thickness in front of the front sight post, ostensibly to resist bending in the field and increase rigidity under sustained fire. The rest of the barrel was maintained at the original thickness for backwards compatibility with the M203 grenade launcher assembly. The barrel rifling was revised to a faster 1:7 (178 mm) twist rate to adequately stabilize the new 5.56×45mm NATO SS109/M855 ball and L110/M856 tracer ammunition. The heavier longer SS109/M855 bullet reduced muzzle velocity from 3,260 ft/s (994 m/s), to about 3,110 ft/s (948 m/s)

A new adjustable rear sight was added, allowing the rear sight to be dialed in for specific range settings between 300 and 800 meters to take full advantage of the ballistic characteristics of the SS109/M855 rounds, and to allow windage adjustments without the need of a tool or cartridge. The flash suppressor was again modified, this time to be closed on the bottom, so the new birdcage-type muzzle device would not kick up dirt or snow when being fired from the prone position, and additionally act as an asymmetric recoil compensator to reduce muzzle climb.

A spent case deflector was incorporated into the upper receiver immediately behind the ejection port to prevent (hot) cartridge cases from striking users shooting from the left shoulder. The action was also modified, replacing the original fully automatic setting with a three-round burst setting. When using a fully automatic weapon, inexperienced troops often hold down the trigger and "spray" when under fire. The U.S. Army concluded that three-shot groups provide an optimum combination of ammunition conservation, accuracy, and firepower. The number of rounds fired in a burst is determined by a cam mechanism that trips the trigger mechanism for each shot in the burst. For the burst, the trigger must be held down for the full duration of the burst. The fire control group will terminate the burst if the trigger is released before the burst is complete but keep the cam in position. Thus, the next time the trigger is pulled, the weapon will only fire one or two rounds. The US Army and USMC have both retired the M16A2, in favor of the newer M4A1 carbine and M16A4 respectively; a few M16A2s remain in service with the U.S. Army Reserve and National Guard.

The handguard was modified from the original triangular shape to a round one, which better fit smaller hands and could be retrofitted to older models of the M16. The new handguards were also symmetrical, so armories did not need to stock separate left- and right-hand spares. The handguard retention ring was also tapered to make it easier to install and uninstall the handguards.

The new buttstock became ten times stronger than the original due to advances in polymer technology since the early 1960s. Original M16 stocks were made from cellulose-impregnated phenolic resin; the newer M16A2 stocks were engineered from DuPont Zytel glass-filled thermoset polymers and became a replacement part for the preceding M16A1. The new buttstock was lengthened by 5/8 in (15.9 mm), and whilst the hinged trapdoor and storage compartment inside the stock was retained, the anti-slip texturing now covers the entire buttplate for better grip on the shoulder.

The A2 barrel profile has a greater thickness from the front sight post to the muzzle, and after bending in this area was reported in the field. Tests by the M16A2 team showed that this increased the resistance to intentional bending in this area by a factor of 9. To not further increase weight beyond acceptable levels, and to maintain commonality with the M203 grenade launcher, the rear half under the handguard maintained its original thin profile. After the new technical data was submitted, the team discovered that they had made an error in assessing the problem - the replaced bent barrels were not actually bent. When inspecting some using a borescope, they discovered that a burr left from drilling/reaming the gas port was causing copper fouling to build up at the front sight block, interfering with the gauge used. Cleaning this fouling caused the "bent" barrels to re-pass inspection. However, this discovery came too late in the process to reverse the change in profile.

A notch for the middle finger was added to the pistol grip, as well as more aggressive texturing on the sides to enhance the grip, especially while wearing winter gloves. The new pistol grips were engineered from Zytel glass-filled thermoset polymers. The M16A2 pistol grip consequently became a replacement part for the preceding M16A1.

While the standard M16A2 (Model 701 in Colt nomenclature) features a three position safe/semi/three-round burst selective fire control group, there also exists a four position safe/semi/three-round burst/automatic selective trigger pack for the Model 708 version of the rifle named "M16A2 Enhanced", used by some international customers like the 32nd Marines Brigade of the Hellenic Army. It can be distinguished from the standard M16A2 by the presence of the enlarged fire selector lever, with a prominent triangular ridge and thumb dowel, as well as corresponding fire position markings on both sides of the receiver.

=== M16A3 ===
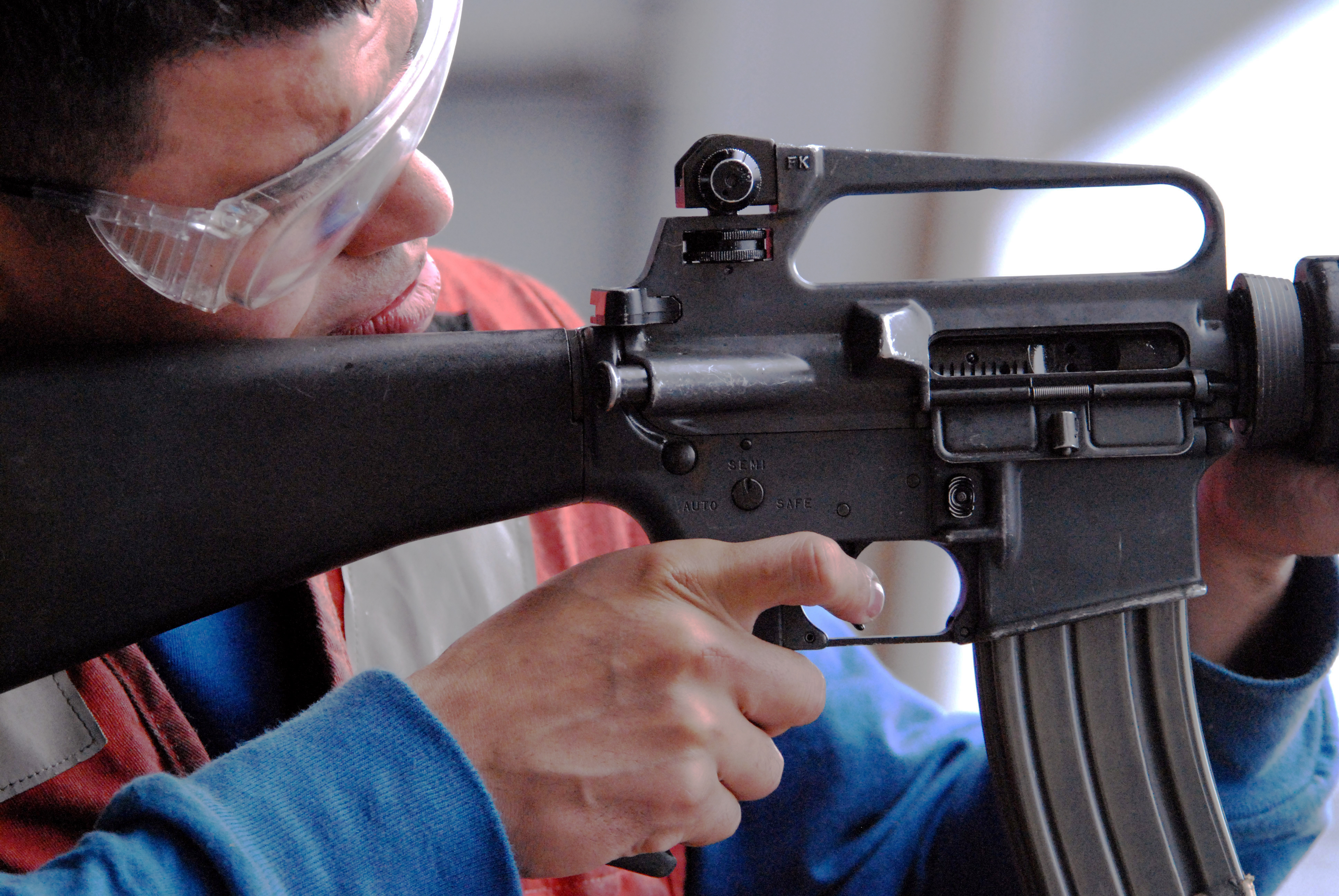
M16A3 with a Safe/Semi/Auto trigger group

The M16A3 is a modified version of the M16A2 adopted in small numbers by the U.S. Navy SEALs, Seabees, some US security units, and the Philippine National Police. It features the M16A1 selective fire control group providing "safe", "semi-automatic" and "fully automatic" modes, and type-specific markings on the magazine well. Otherwise, it is externally identical to the M16A2. The M16A3 also had a removable carry handle by Colt's international Models used for the M16A4, under the name Colt RO901/R0901 (see more in M16A4 section).

=== M16A4 ===
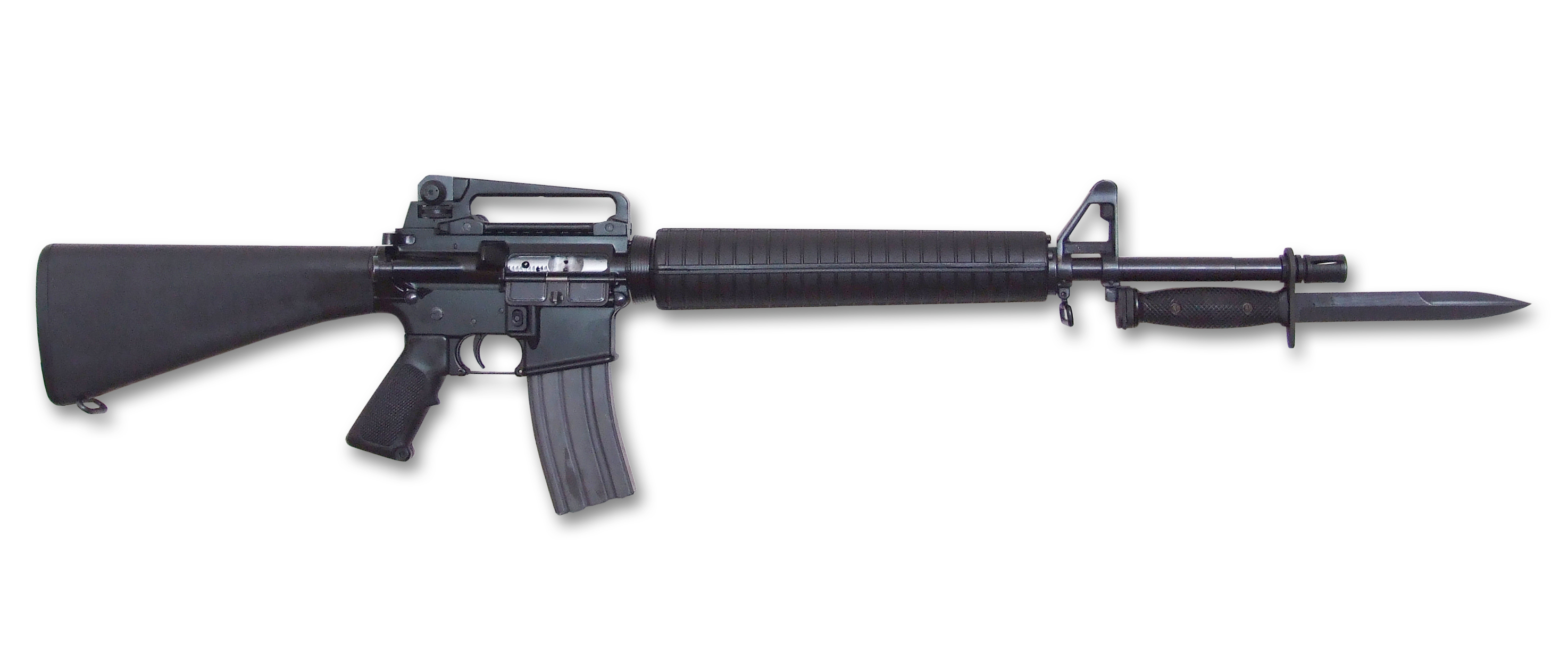
M16A4 rifle with a removable carrying handle, polymer handguards and M7 bayonet mounted

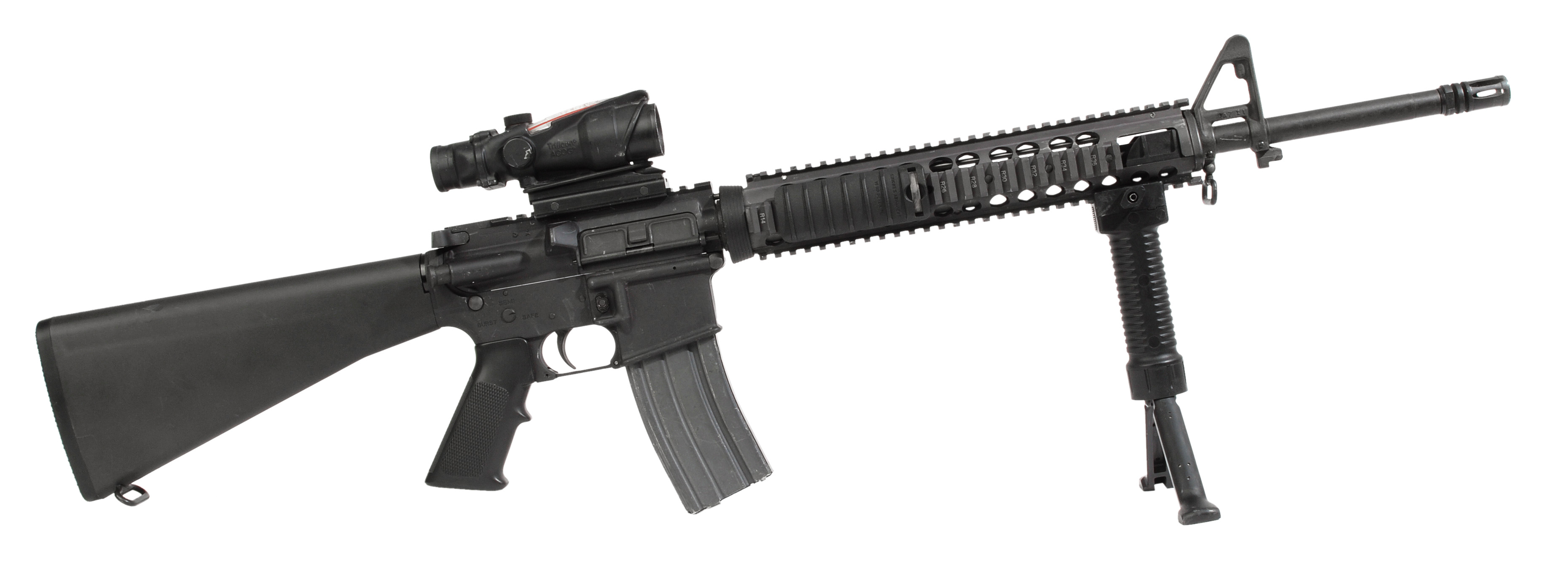
M16A4 rifle with ACOG sight, railed hand guard and foregrip

Adopted in July 1997, the M16A4 is the fourth generation of the M16 series. It is equipped with a removable carrying handle and Picatinny rail for mounting optics and other ancillary devices. The M16A4 rear aperture sights are adjustable from 300 m (330 yd) up to 600 m (660 yd), where the further similar M16A2 iron sights line can reach up to 800 m (870 yd). The introduction of the Picatinny rail required the use of a higher F-marked front sight base to raise the post. The FN M16A4, with safe/semi/three-round burst selective fire modes, became standard issue for the U.S. Marine Corps.

Colt also produces M16A4 models for international purchases:

- R0901 / RO901/ NSN 1005-01-383-2872 (Safe/Semi/Auto)
- R0905 / RO905 (Safe/Semi/Burst)

A study of significant changes to Marine M16A4 rifles released in February 2015 outlined several new features that could be added from inexpensive and available components. Those features included: a muzzle compensator in place of the flash suppressor to manage recoil and allow for faster follow-on shots, though at the cost of noise and flash signature and potential overpressure in close quarters; a heavier and/or free-floating barrel to increase accuracy from 4.5 MOA (Minute(s) Of Angle) to potentially 2 MOA; changing the reticle on the Rifle Combat Optic from chevron-shaped to a semi-circular reticle with a dot at the center used in the M27 IAR's Squad Day Optic so as not to obscure the target at long distance; using a trigger group with a more consistent pull force, even a reconsideration of the burst capability; and the addition of ambidextrous charging handles and bolt catch releases for easier use with left-handed shooters.

In 2014, Marine units were provided with a limited number of adjustable stocks in place of the traditional fixed stock for their M16A4s to issue to smaller Marines who would have trouble comfortably reaching the trigger when wearing body armor. The adjustable stocks were added as a standard authorized accessory, meaning units can use operations and maintenance funds to purchase more if needed.

The Marine Corps had long maintained the full-length M16 as their standard infantry rifle, but in October 2015 the switch to the M4 carbine was approved as the standard-issue weapon, giving Marine infantry a smaller and more compact weapon. Enough M4s were already in the inventory to re-equip all necessary units by September 2016, and all M16A4s were moved to support and non-infantry Marines.

=== Summary of differences ===
Colt model no.	Military designation	20-in barrel w/ bayonet lug	Handguard type	Buttstock type	Pistol grip type	Lower receiver type	Upper receiver type	Rear sight type	Front sight type	Muzzle device	Forward assist?	Case deflector?	Trigger pack
601	AR-15 designated M16 on 3 December 1963	A1 profile (1:14 twist)	Green or brown full-length triangular	Green or brown fixed A1	A1	A1	A1	A1	A1	Duckbill flash suppressor	No	No	Safe/Semi/Auto
602	AR-15 designated M16 3 December 1963 – there was no XM16	A1 profile (1:12 twist)	Full-length triangular	Fixed A1	A1	A1	A1	A1	A1	Duckbill or three-prong flash suppressor	No	No	Safe/Semi/Auto
603	XM16E1 designation changed to M16A1 in February 1967 with standardization	A1 profile (1:12 twist)	Full-length triangular	Fixed A1	A1	A1	A1	A1	A1	Three-prong or M16A1 birdcage flash suppressor	Yes	No	Safe/Semi/Auto
603	M16A1	A1 profile (1:12 twist)	Full-length triangular	Fixed A1	A1	A1	A1	A1	A1	Three-prong or birdcage flash suppressor	Yes	Yes or No	Safe/Semi/Auto
604	M16	A1 profile (1:12 twist)	Full-length triangular	Fixed A1	A1	A1	A1	A1	A1	Three-prong or M16A1-style birdcage flash suppressor	No	No	Safe/Semi/Auto
645	M16A1E1/PIP	A2 profile (1:7 twist)	Full-length ribbed	Fixed A2	A1	A1 or A2	A1 or A2	A1 or A2	A2	M16A1 or M16A2-style birdcage flash suppressor	Yes	Yes or no	Safe/Semi/Auto or Safe/Semi/Burst
701	M16A2	A2 profile (1:7 twist)	Full-length ribbed	Fixed A2	A2	A2	A2	A2	A2	M16A2-style birdcage flash suppressor	Yes	Yes	Safe/Semi/Burst or Safe/Semi/Burst/Auto
708	M16A2 Enhanced	A2 profile (1:7 twist)	Full-length ribbed	Fixed A2	A2	A2	A2	A2	A2	M16A2-style birdcage flash suppressor	Yes	Yes	Safe/Semi/Burst/Auto
645E	M16A2E1	A2 profile (1:7 twist)	Full-length ribbed	Fixed A2	A2	A2	Flattop with Colt rail	Flip-up	Folding	M16A2-style birdcage flash suppressor	Yes	Yes	Safe/Semi/Burst or Safe/Semi/Burst/Auto
N/A	M16A2E2	A2 profile (1:7 twist)	Full-length semi-beavertail w/ HEL guide	Retractable ACR	ACR	A2	Flattop with Colt rail	None	A2	ACR muzzle brake	Yes	Yes	Safe/Semi/Burst or Safe/Semi/Burst/Auto
646	M16A3 (M16A2E3)	A2 profile (1:7 twist)	Full-length ribbed	Fixed A2	A2	A2	A2	A2	A2	M16A2-style birdcage flash suppressor	Yes	Yes	Safe/Semi/Auto
655	M16A1 Special High Profile	HBAR profile (1:12 twist)	Full-length triangular	Fixed A1	A1	A1	A1	A1	A1	M16A1-style birdcage flash suppressor	Yes	No	Safe/Semi/Auto
656	M16A1 Special Low Profile	HBAR profile (1:12 twist)	Full-length triangular	Fixed A1	A1	A1	A1 with modified Weaver base	Low Profile A1	Hooded A1	M16A1-style birdcage flash suppressor	Yes	No	Safe/Semi/Auto
945	M16A4 (M16A2E4)	A2 profile (1:7 twist)	Full-length ribbed or KAC M5 RAS	Fixed A2/M4 collapsed stock	A2	A2	Flattop with MIL-STD-1913 rail	None	A4	M16A2-style birdcage flash suppressor	Yes	Yes	Safe/Semi/Auto (RO901) or Safe/Semi/Burst (RO905)

== Derivatives ==
=== Colt Commando (XM177 & GAU-5) ===
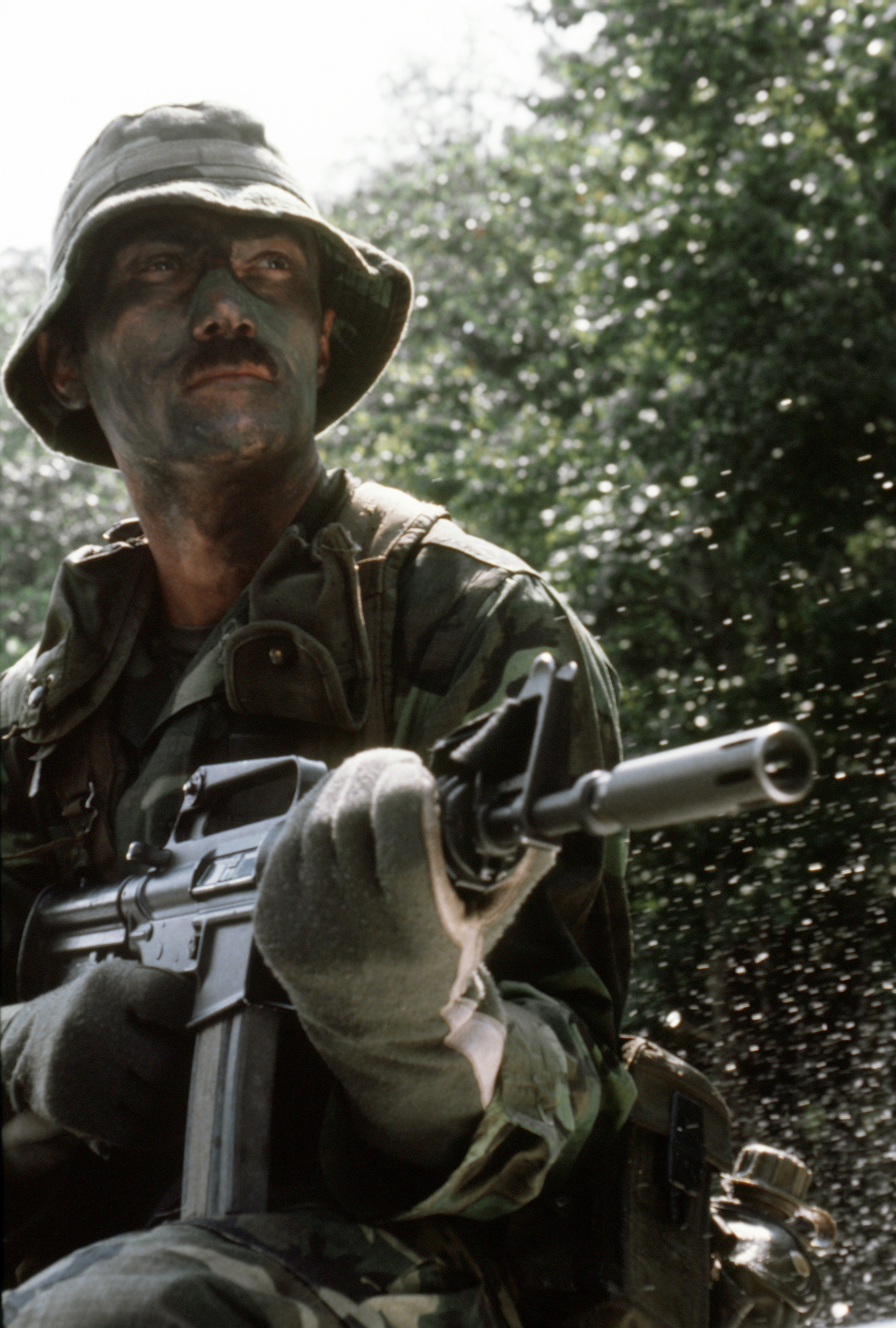
A USAF Combat Control Team member with a GAU-5 carbine and moderator

In Vietnam, some soldiers were issued a carbine version of the M16 named XM177. The XM177 had a shorter 10 in (254 mm) barrel and a telescoping metal stock, which made it substantially lighter and more compact. It also possessed a combination flash hider/sound moderator to reduce the increased muzzle flash and loudened report. The Air Force's GAU-5/A (XM177) and the Army's XM177E1 variants differed over the latter's inclusion of a forward assist, although some GAU-5s do have the forward assist. The final Air Force GAU-5/A and Army XM177E2 had an 11.5 in (292 mm) barrel with a longer flash/sound suppressor. The lengthening of the barrel was to support the attachment of Colt's own XM148 40 mm grenade launcher. These versions were also known as the Colt Commando model commonly referenced and marketed as the CAR-15. The variants were issued in limited numbers to special forces, helicopter crews, Air Force pilots, Air Force Security Police Military Working Dog (MWD) handlers, officers, radio operators, artillerymen, and troops other than front line riflemen. Some USAF GAU-5A/As were later equipped with even longer 14.5-inch (370 mm) 1/12 rifled barrels as the two shorter versions were worn out. The 14.5-inch (370 mm) barrel allowed the use of MILES gear and for bayonets to be used with the sub-machine guns (as the Air Force described them). By 1989, the Air Force started to replace the earlier barrels with 1/7 rifled models for use with the M855-round. The weapons were given the redesignation of GUU-5/P.

These were used by the British Special Air Service during the Falklands War.

=== M4 carbine ===
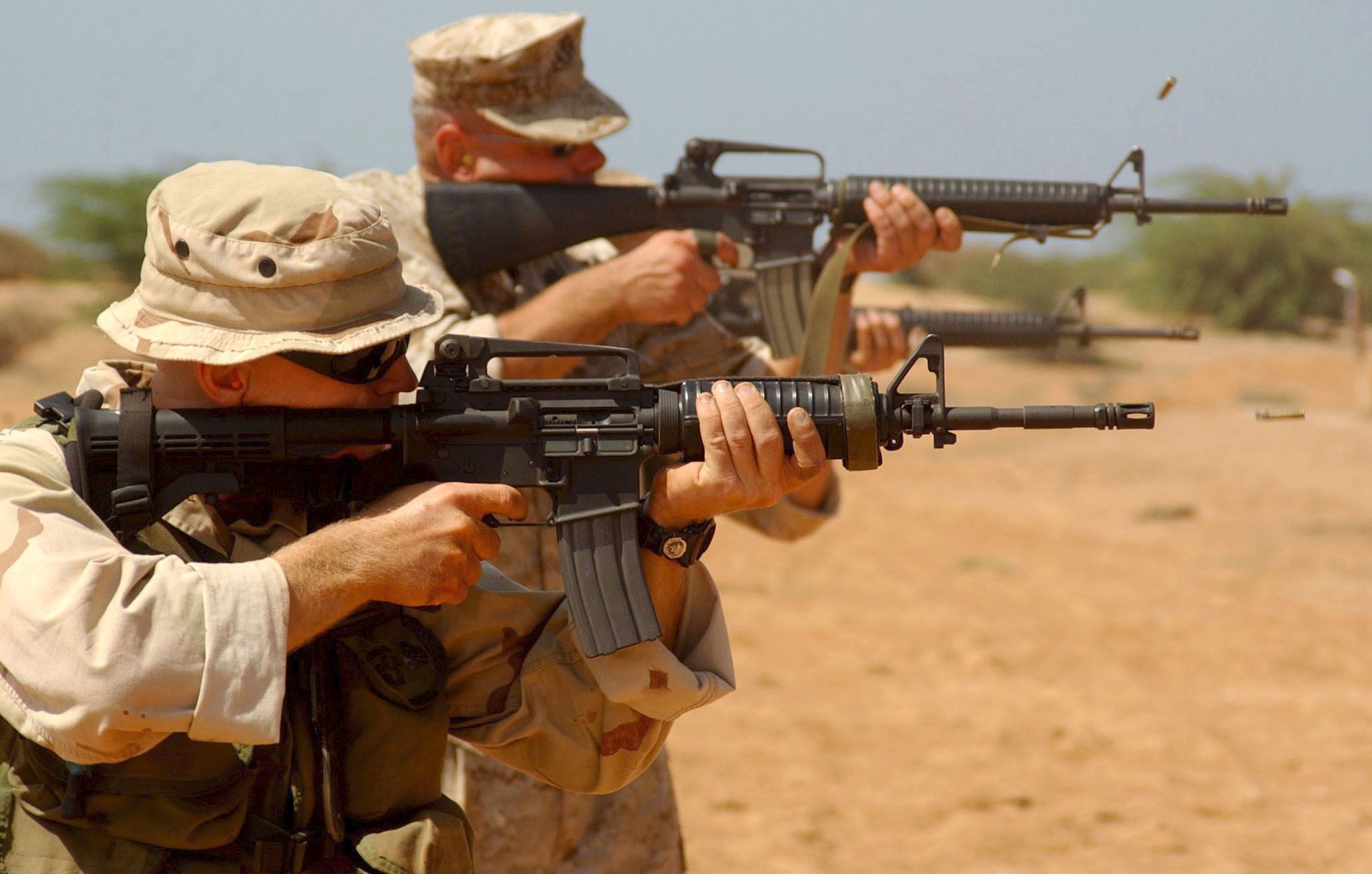
An M4A1 carbine (foreground) and two M16A2s (background) being fired by U.S. Marines during a live fire exercise: though adopted in the 1990s and derived from the M16A2, the M4 carbine was part of a long line of short-barreled AR-15 used in the U.S. military

The M4 carbine was developed from various outgrowths of these designs, including a number of 14.5-inch-barreled (368 mm) A1-style carbines. The XM4 (Colt Model 720) started its trials in 1984, with a new 14.5 in (370 millimetres) "stepped" barrel, case deflector, M16A2 rear sight, and a new elliptical handguard. The weapon became type classified as the "Carbine, 5.56mm, M4" in 1991. Officially adopted as a replacement for the M3 "Grease Gun" (and the Beretta M9 and M16A2 for select troops) in 1994, it was used with great success in the Balkans and in more recent conflicts, including the Afghanistan and Iraq theaters. The M4 carbine has a three-round burst firing mode, while the M4A1 carbine has a fully automatic firing mode. Both have a Picatinny rail on the upper receiver, allowing the carry handle/rear sight assembly to be replaced with other sighting devices.

==== M4 Commando ====
Colt also returned to the original "Commando" idea, with its Model 733, essentially a simplified XM177E2 with the flash hider/sound moderator deleted and replaced with a normal birdcage-style flash hider. Over the different production runs Colt would assemble the guns with whatever parts were on hand, sometimes leading to the mixing of different M16, M16A1, M16A1E1, and M16A2 features on individual guns.

=== M5 carbine ===
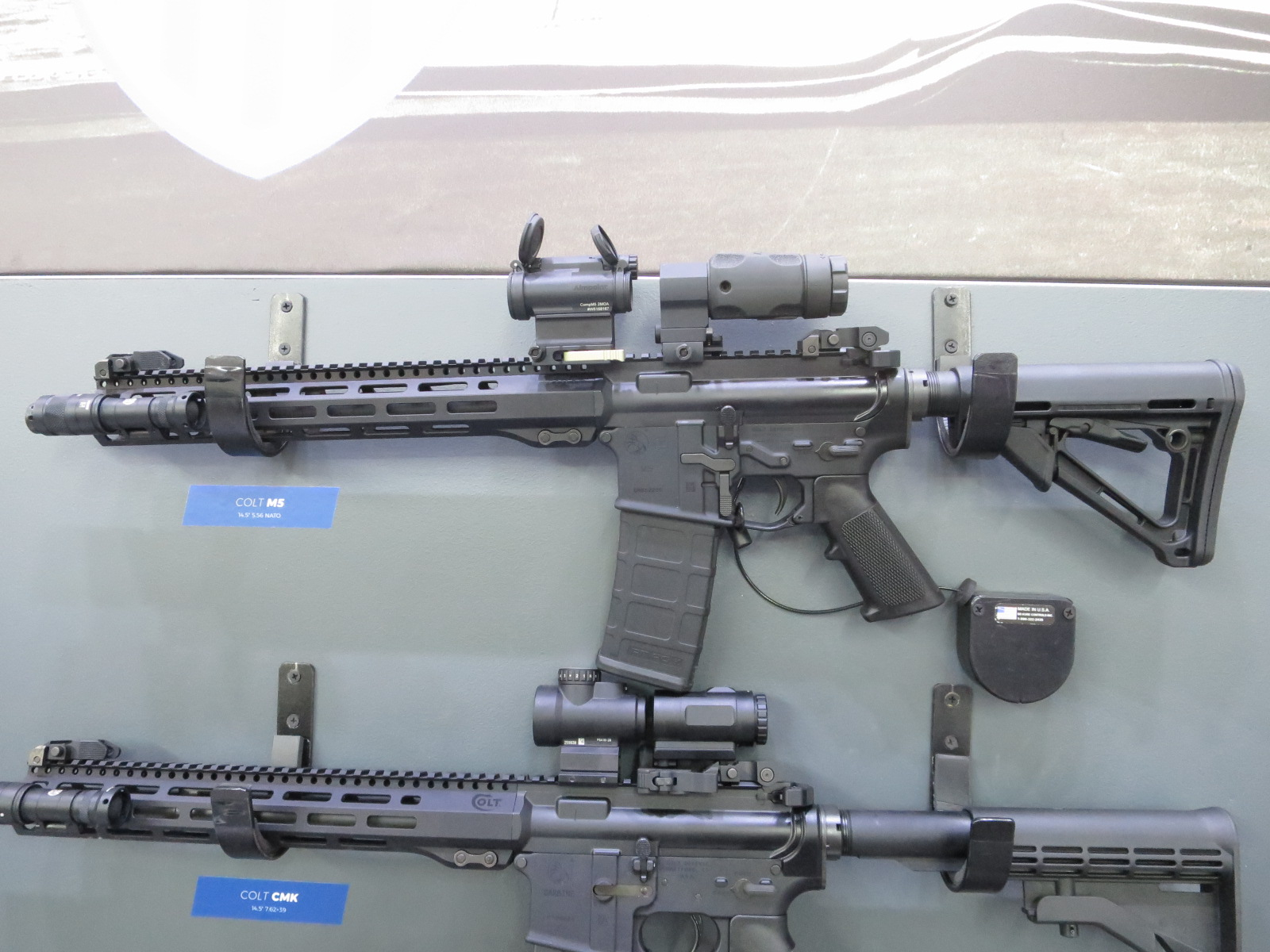
M5 carbine

The M5 carbine system was developed by Colt as an improvement on the M4 carbine. It incorporates an ambidextrous lower receiver, low profile gas block, and floating rail. The M5 carbine has four possible barrel lengths: 10.3, 11.5, 14.5 and 16.1 inches. Other M5 variants and calibers are the: M5 SCW (Sub-compact weapon) (5.56×45mm); M5 300 (.300 AAC Blackout); M5 SMG (9×19mm); CMK (7.62×39mm); M7 Battle Rifle (7.62×51mm) and Designated Marksman and Semi-Automatic Sniper System (both 5.56×45mm).

=== Diemaco C7 and C8 ===
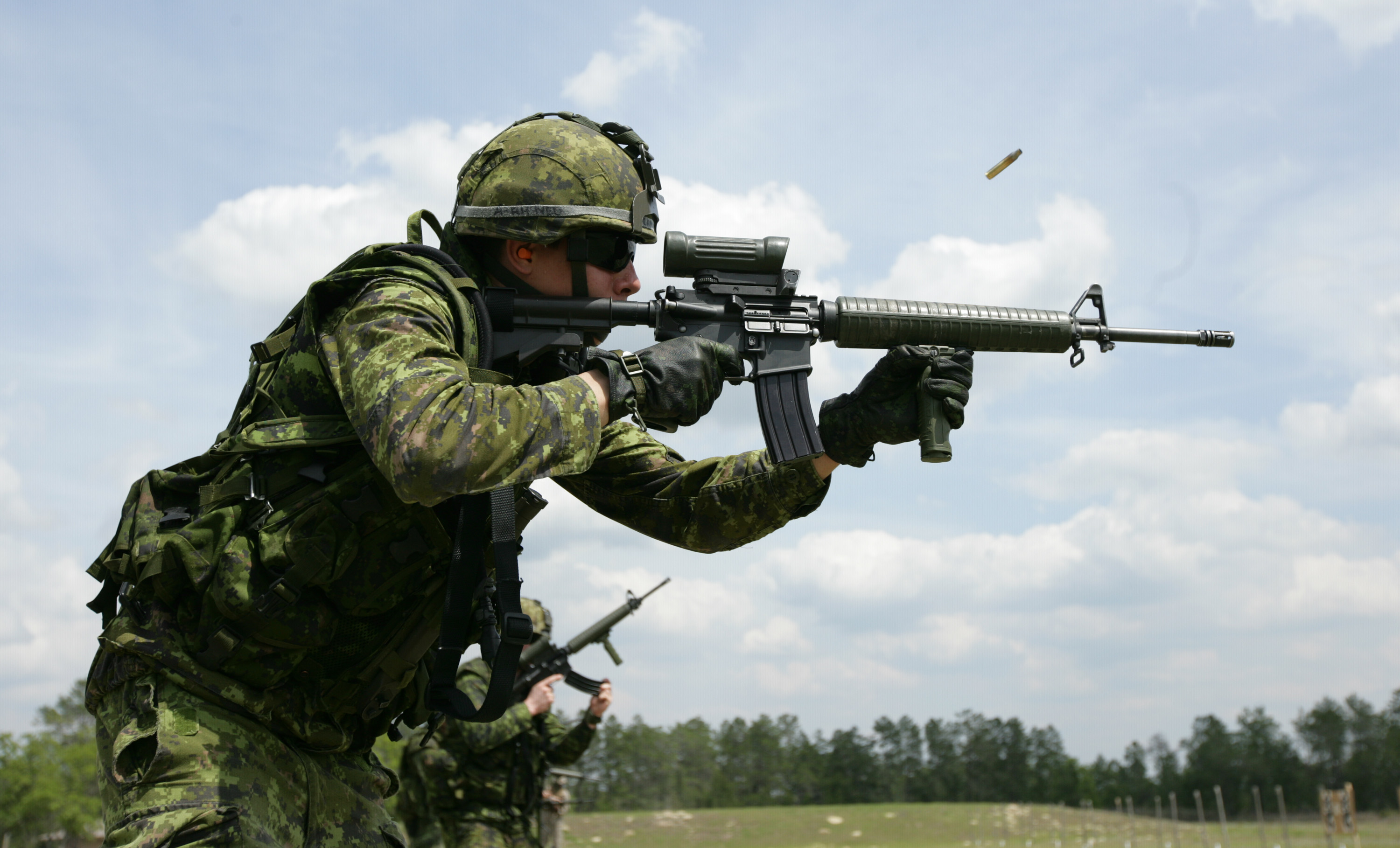
A Canadian soldier fires the current issue C7A2 rifle at the range with a C79A2 sight. This particular example is missing the standard TRIAD mount.

The Diemaco C7 and C8 are a family of rifles developed concurrently with the M16A2. They are the standard issued rifle for the Canadian Armed Forces, manufactured by Diemaco (currently Colt Canada). The C7 is a branch developed from the experimental M16A1E1. Like earlier M16s, it can be fired in either semi-automatic or automatic mode, instead of the burst function selected for the M16A2. The C7 also features the structural strengthening, improved handguards, and longer stock developed for the M16A2. Diemaco changed the trapdoor in the buttstock to make it easier to access and a spacer of 0.5 inches (13 mm) is available to adjust stock length to user preference, along with the addition of hammer-forged barrels. Unlike the American M16A2s, the Diemaco C7s utilize A1 style rear sights. The Canadians originally desired to use a heavy barrel profile instead.

The C7 has been developed to the C7A1, with a Weaver rail on the upper receiver for a C79 3.4×28 optical sight, and to the C7A2, with different furniture and internal improvements. The Diemaco produced Weaver rail on the original C7A1 variants does not meet the M1913 "Picatinny" standard, leading to some problems with mounting commercial sights. This is easily remedied with minor modification to the upper receiver or the sight itself. Since Diemaco's acquisition by Colt to form Colt Canada, all Canadian produced flattop upper receivers are machined to the M1913 standard.

The C8 is the carbine version of the C7. The C7 and C8 are also used by Hærens Jegerkommando, Marinejegerkommandoen and FSK (Norway), Denmark's Armed Forces (all branches), and the Netherlands Armed Forces as its main infantry weapon. Following trials, variants became the weapon of choice of the British SAS.

=== Mk 4 Mod 0 ===
The Mk 4 Mod 0 was a variant of the M16A1 produced for the U.S. Navy SEALs during the Vietnam War and adopted in April 1970. It differed from the basic M16A1 primarily in being optimized for maritime operations and coming equipped with a sound suppressor. Most of the operating parts of the rifle were coated in Kal-Gard lubricant, a hole of 0.25 inches (6.4 mm) was drilled through the stock and buffer tube for drainage, and an O-ring was added to the end of the buffer assembly. The weapon could reportedly be carried to the depth of 200 feet (61 m) in water without damage. The initial Mk 2 Mod 0 Blast Suppressor was based on the U.S. Army's Human Engineering Lab's (HEL) M4 noise suppressor. The HEL M4 vented gas directly from the action, requiring a modified bolt carrier. A gas deflector was added to the charging handle to prevent gas from contacting the user. Thus, the HEL M4 suppressor was permanently mounted though it allowed normal semi-automatic and automatic operation. If the HEL M4 suppressor were removed, the weapon would have to be manually cycled after each single shot. On the other hand, the Mk 2 Mod 0 blast suppressor was considered an integral part of the Mk 4 Mod 0 rifle, but it would function normally if the suppressor were removed. The Mk 2 Mod 0 blast suppressor also drained water much more quickly and did not require any modification to the bolt carrier or to the charging handle. In the late 1970s, the Mk 2 Mod 0 blast suppressor was replaced by the Mk 2 blast suppressor made by Knight's Armament Company (KAC). The KAC suppressor can be fully submerged and water will drain out in less than eight seconds. It will operate without degradation even if the rifle is fired at the maximum rate of fire. The U.S. Army replaced the HEL M4 with the much simpler Studies in Operational Negation of Insurgency and Counter-Subversion (SIONICS) MAW-A1 noise and flash suppressor.

=== Mk 12 Special Purpose Rifle ===
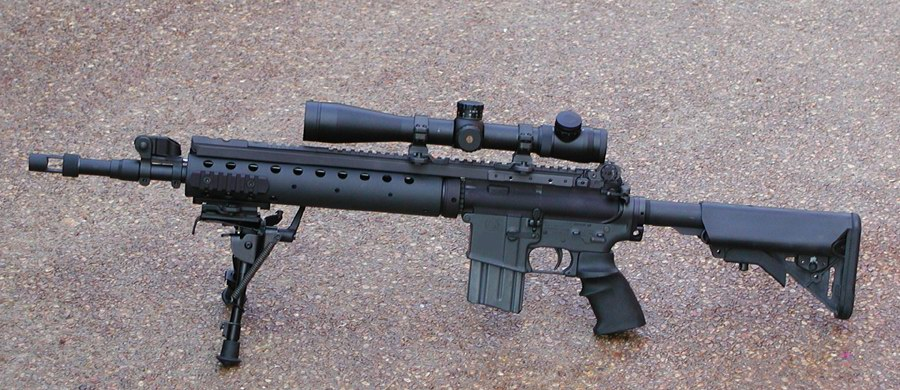
US Navy Mk 12 Special Purpose Rifle

Developed to increase the effective range of soldiers in the designated marksman role, the U.S. Navy developed the Mk 12 Special Purpose Rifle (SPR). Configurations in service vary, but the core of the Mk 12 SPR is an 18" heavy barrel with muzzle brake and free float tube. This tube relieves pressure on the barrel caused by standard handguards and greatly increases the potential accuracy of the system. Also common are higher magnification optics ranging from the 6× power Trijicon ACOG to the Leupold Mark 4 Tactical rifle scopes. Firing Mk 262 Mod 0 ammunition with a 77gr Open tip Match bullet, the system has an official effective range of 600+ meters. However, published reports of confirmed kills beyond 800 m from Iraq and Afghanistan were not uncommon.

=== M231 Firing Port Weapon (FPW) ===
M231 FPW

The M231 Firing Port Weapon (FPW) is an adapted version of the M16 assault rifle for firing from ports on the M2 Bradley. The infantry's normal M16s are too long for use in a "buttoned up" fighting vehicle, so the FPW was developed to provide a suitable weapon for this role.

=== Colt Model 655 and 656 "Sniper" variants ===
With the expanding Vietnam War, Colt developed two rifles of the M16 pattern for evaluation as possible light sniper or designated marksman rifles. The Colt Model 655 M16A1 Special High Profile was essentially a standard A1 rifle with a heavier barrel and a scope bracket that attached to the rifle's carry handle. The Colt Model 656 M16A1 Special Low Profile had a special upper receiver with no carrying handle. Instead, it had a low-profile iron sight adjustable for windage and a Weaver base for mounting a scope, a precursor to the Colt and Picatinny rails. It also had a hooded front iron sight in addition to the heavy barrel. Both rifles came standard with either a Leatherwood/Realist scope 3–9× Adjustable Ranging Telescope. Some of them were fitted with a Sionics noise and flash suppressor. Neither of these rifles were ever standardized.

These weapons can be seen in many ways to be predecessors of the U.S. Army's SDM-R and the USMC's SAM-R weapons.

=== Mekut'zrar ===
Israel was supplied with large numbers of M16A1 rifles by the US Government, many of which were shortened to make them more suitable for urban combat, storage in vehicles, and policing use by shortening them. The 20-inch M16A1 barrel was pruned back to just behind the gas port, while a new gas port was drilled to accommodate a carbine-length gas system as the front sight base was pinned in place. The barrel was also threaded for a standard M16A1 birdcage flash suppressor and the resulting barrel was just shy of 13-inch overall, and a CAR-15 type collapsible buttstock was fitted to replace the fixed M16A1 fixed buttstock, thus they approximate the size of CAR-15 type carbines. The informal term "Mekut'zrar" translates to "sawed-off" or "shorty".

=== Others ===
- The Chinese Norinco CQ is an unlicensed derivative of the M16A1 made specifically for export, with the most obvious external differences being in its handguard and revolver-style pistol grip.
  - The ARMADA rifle (a copy of the Norinco CQ) and TRAILBLAZER carbine (a copy of the Norinco CQ Type A) are manufactured by S.A.M. – Shooter's Arms Manufacturing, a.k.a. Shooter's Arms Guns & Ammo Corporation, headquartered in Metro Cebu, Republic of the Philippines.
  - The S-5.56 rifle, a clone of the Type CQ, is manufactured by the Defense Industries Organization of Iran. The rifle itself is offered in two variants: the S-5.56 A1 with a 19.9-inch barrel and 1:12 pitch rifling (1 turn in 305 mm), optimized for the use of the M193 Ball cartridge; and the S-5.56 A3 with a 20-inch barrel and a 1:7 pitch rifling (1 turn in 177, 8 mm), optimized for the use of the SS109 cartridge.
  - The KH-2002 is an Iranian bullpup conversion of the locally produced S-5.56 rifle. Iran intends to replace the standard-issue weapon of its armed forces with this rifle.
  - The Terab rifle is a copy of the DIO S-5.56 manufactured by the Military Industry Corporation of Sudan.
- The M16S1 is the M16A1 rifle made under license by ST Kinetics in Singapore. It was the standard-issue weapon of the Singapore Armed Forces. It has been replaced by the Singapore-made SAR 21 since 1999.
- M16A1s were formerly made in the Philippines by Elisco Tool Manufacturing Company.
- The Marine Scout Sniper Rifle is a sniper rifle developed by the Philippine Marine Corps Scout Snipers that serves as their primary sniper weapon system.
- The Special Operations Assault Rifle (SOAR) assault carbine was developed by Ferfrans based on the M16 rifle. It is used by the Special Action Force of the Philippine National Police.
- Taiwan uses piston-driven M16-based weapons as their standard rifle. These include the T65, T86 and T91 assault rifles.
- Ukraine has announced plans in January 2017 for Ukroboronservis and Aeroscraft to produce the M16 WAC47, an accurized M4 variation that uses standard 7.62×39mm AK-47 cartridges.
- New Zealand has adopted the Lewis Machine and Tool Company's upgraded version of the M16 system to replace the Steyr AUG. This CQB16 rifle will be fielded in 2017 and is named Modular Ambidextrous Rifle System-Light (MARS-L).

== Production and users ==
Worldwide users of the M16 Current Former

The M16 is the most commonly manufactured 5.56×45mm rifle in the world. Currently, the M16 is in use by 15 NATO countries and more than 80 countries worldwide. Together, numerous companies in the United States, Canada, and China have produced more than eight million rifles of all variants. Approximately 90% are still in operation. The M16 replaced both the M14 rifle and M2 carbine as standard infantry rifle of the U.S. armed forces, although the M14 continues to see limited service, mostly in sniper, designated marksman, and ceremonial roles.

=== Users ===
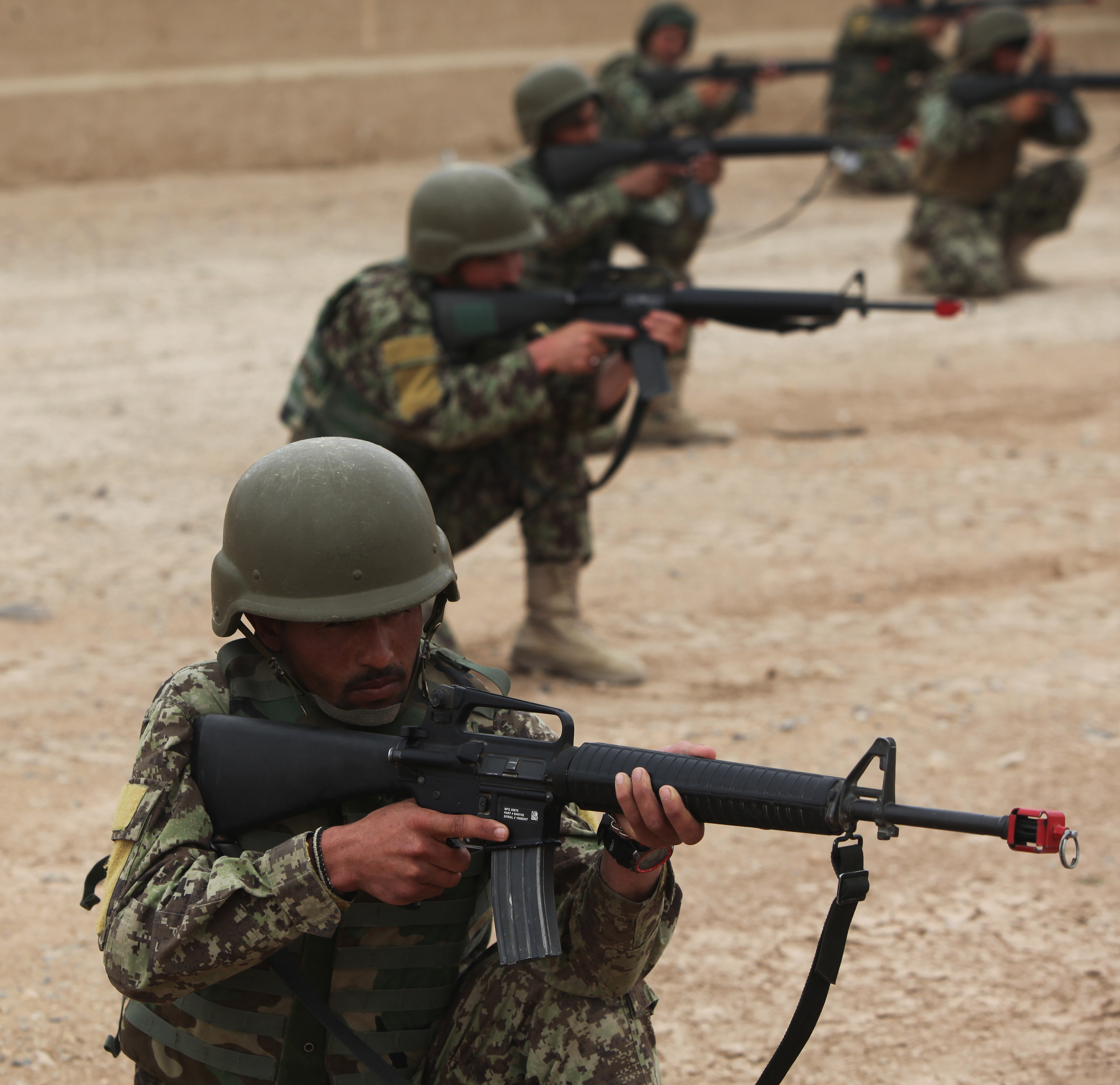
Afghan National Army soldiers with M16A2 rifles

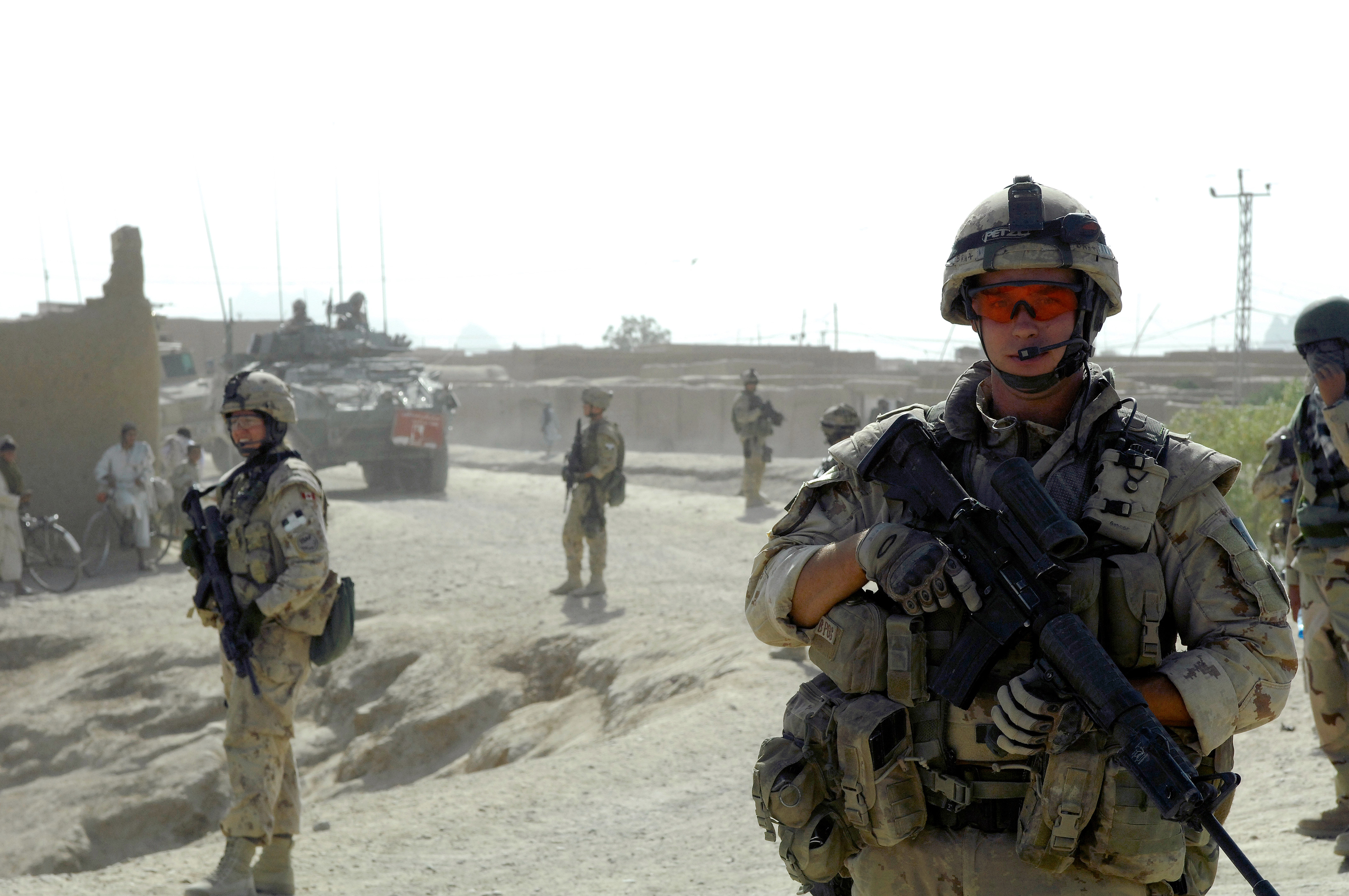
Canadian soldiers patrol Kandahar Afghanistan armed with C7 (M16 type) rifles.

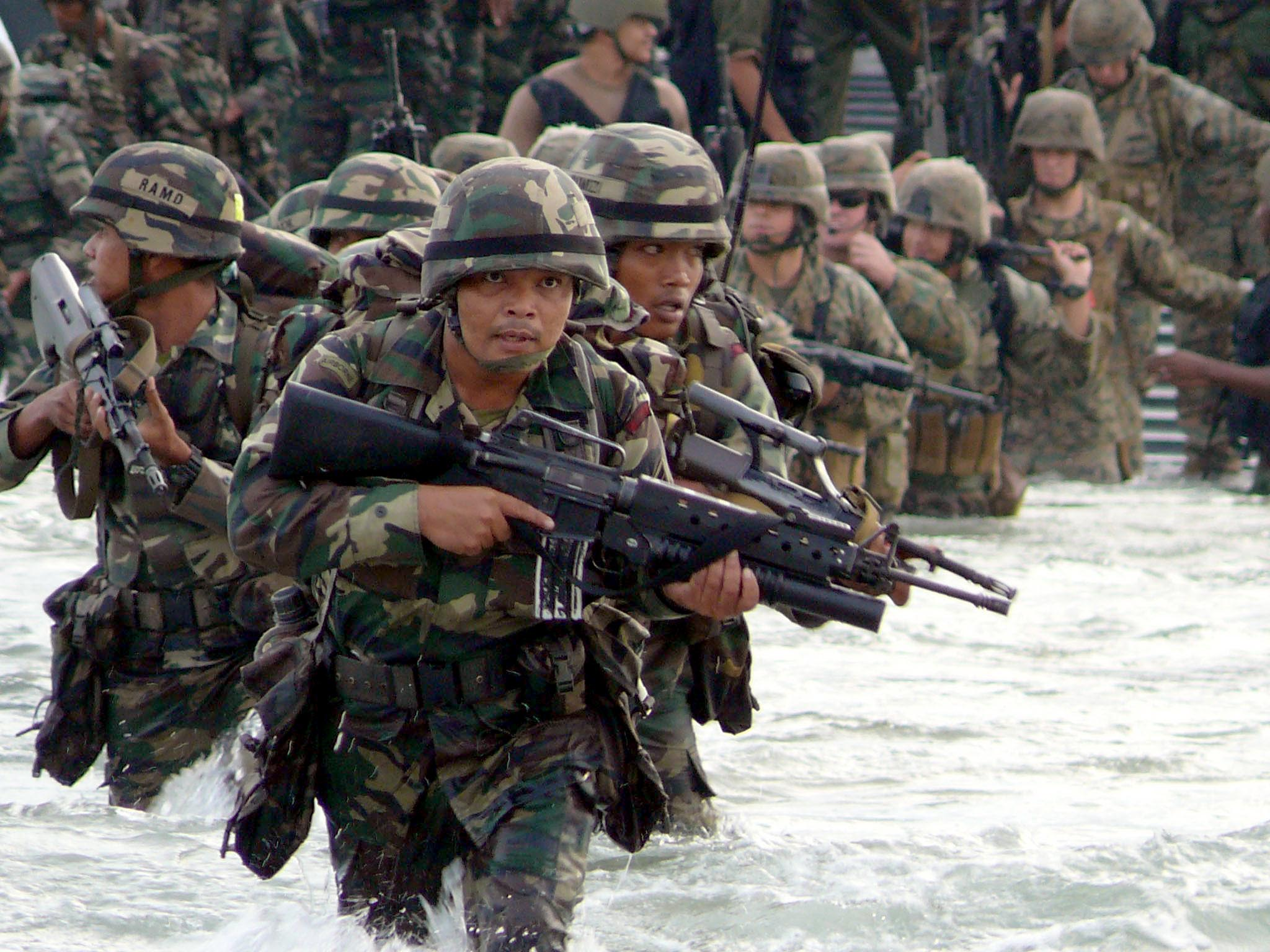
Malaysian Army soldier with an M16A1 equipped with an M203 grenade launcher during a CARAT Malaysia 2008

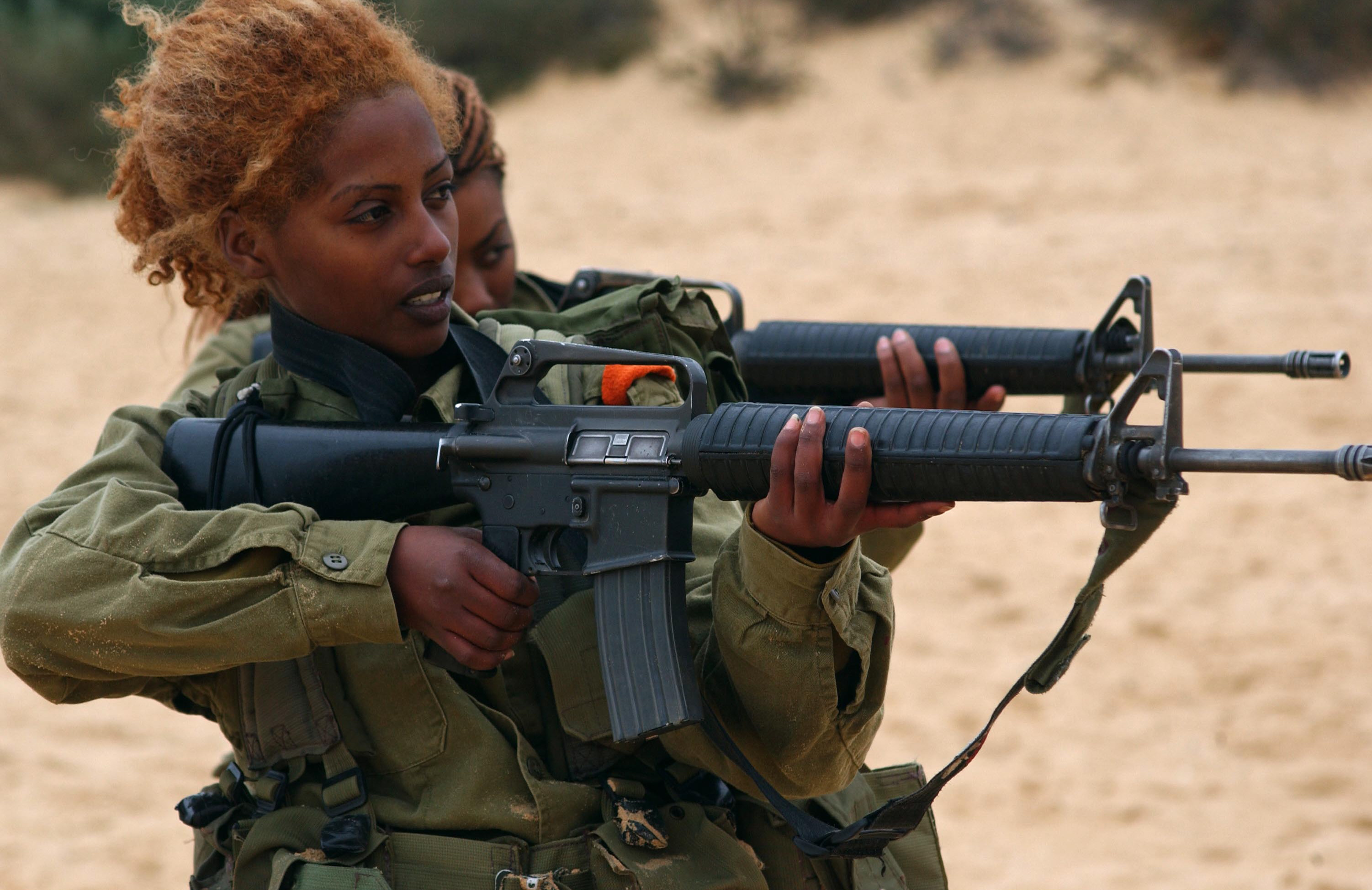
Soldiers of the Israel Defense Forces in training with M16A1 rifles with the A2 style handguard

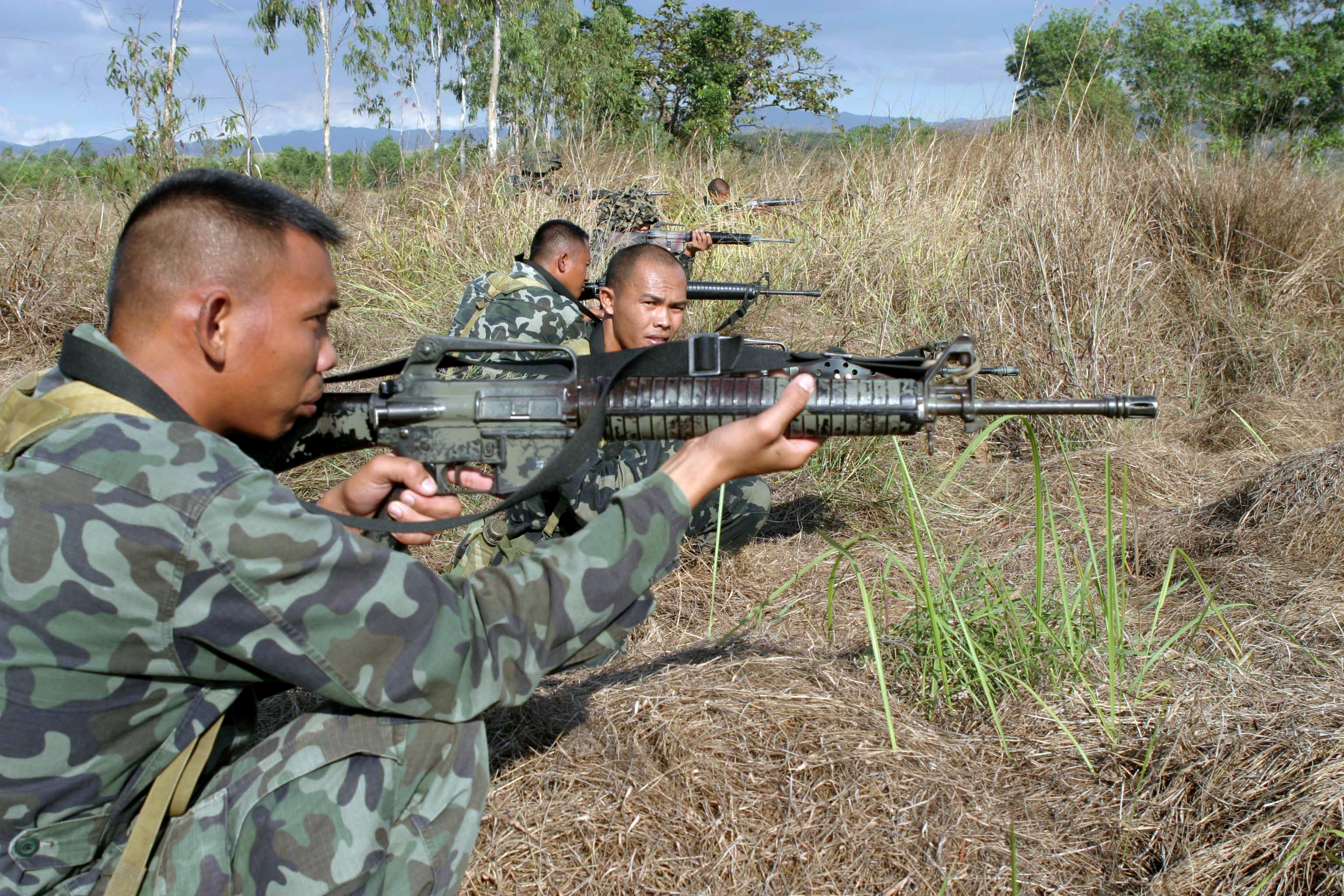
Philippine marines using M16A1 rifles with the A2 style handguard during a military exercise

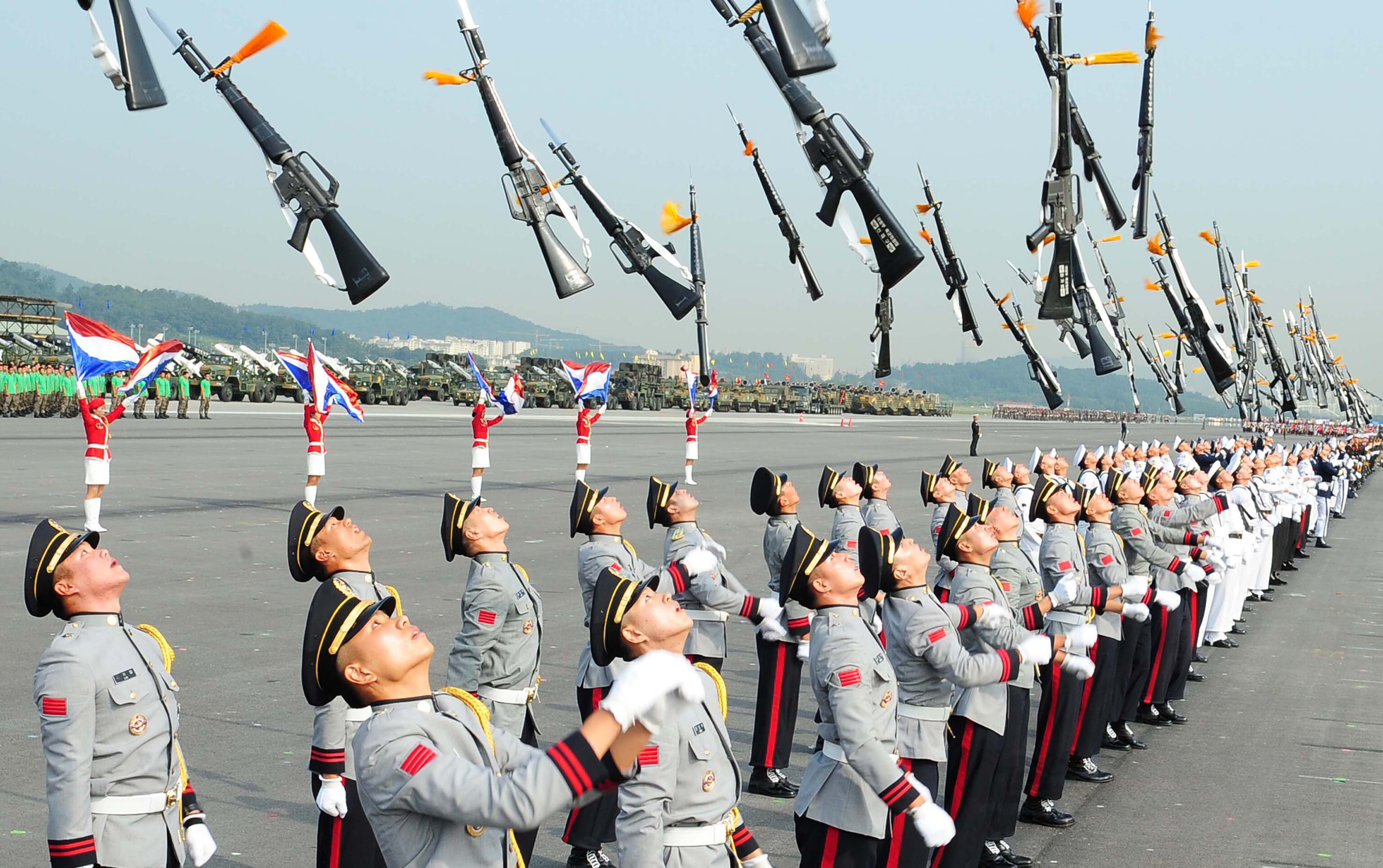
South Korean soldiers toss bayonet mounted M16 rifles into the air at the celebration ceremony for the 65th Anniversary of the South Korean armed forces.

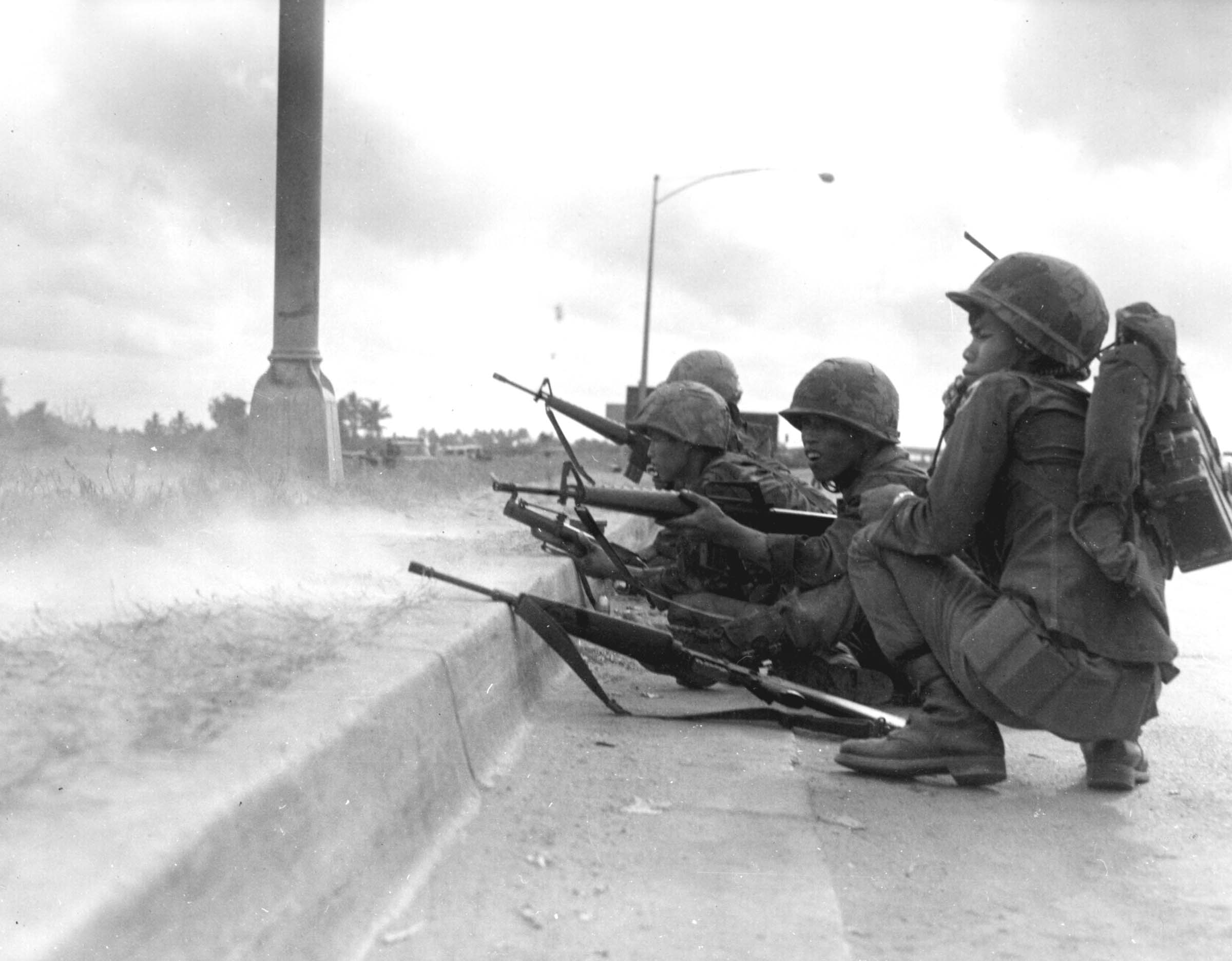
Vietnamese Army (ARVN) Rangers armed with M16s defend Saigon during the Tet Offensive.

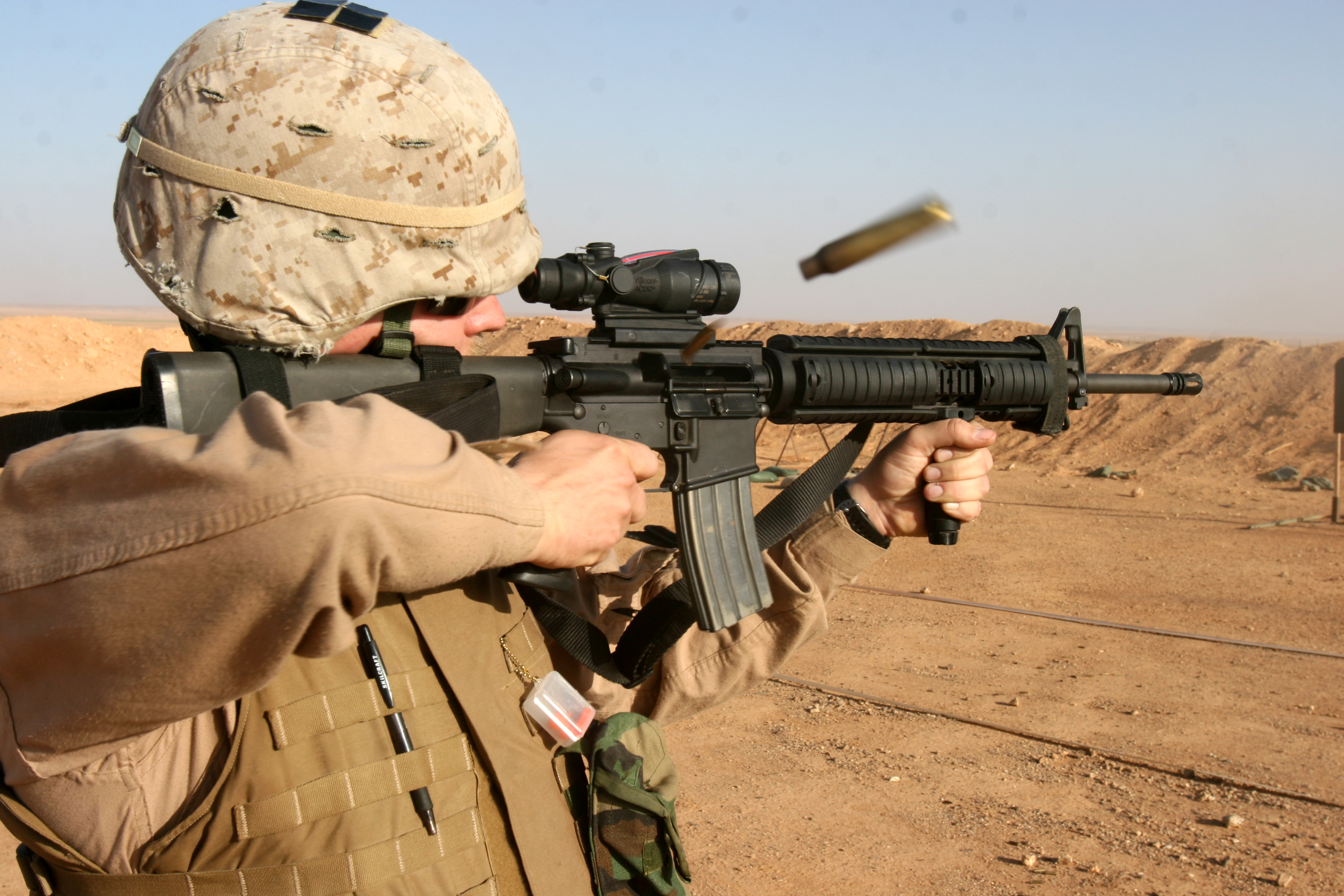
United States Marine firing an M16A4 equipped with an ACOG

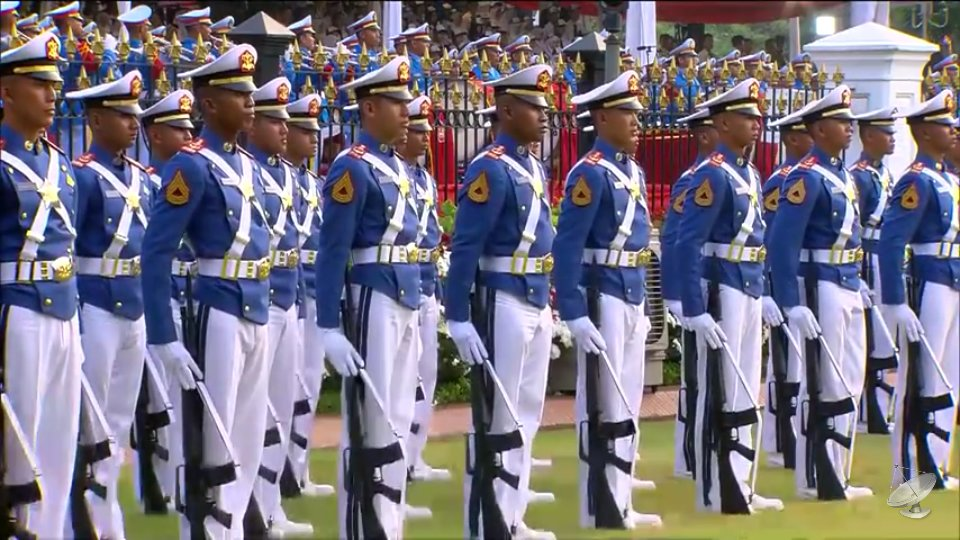
Indonesian Military Academy Cadets seen holding M16A1 rifles with bayonet attached

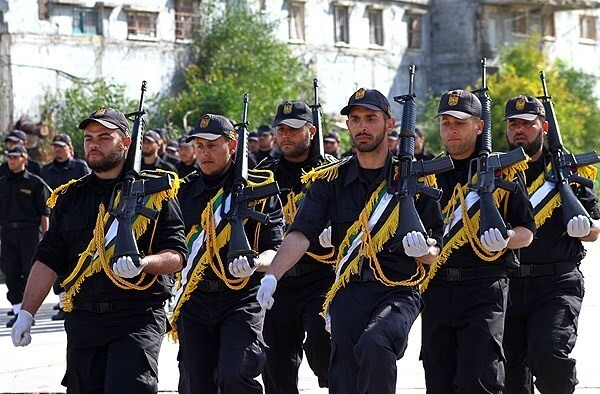
Palestinian Security Forces with an M16A1 & M16A2 rifles during exercise in Gaza, 2012

- Afghanistan: Taliban use M16A2 and M16A4 rifles previously supplied for Afghan National Army. Also in use with the Badri 313 Battalion.
- Albania
- Antigua and Barbuda
- Argentina: Currently use the M16A2 (by all Armed Forces).
- Azerbaijan: M16A4, used by the special forces and State Border Service (DSX).
- Bahrain
- Bangladesh
- Barbados
- Bosnia and Herzegovina: M16A1/A4
- Belize
- Bolivia M16A1/A2
- Brazil: Used by special forces in the final phase of the Araguaia guerrilla war. M16A2s used by Brazilian Marine Corps
- Brunei M16A2 is used by the Royal Brunei Armed Forces as their main service rifle.
- Burundi: Burundian rebels
- Cambodia M16A1
- Cameroon
- Canada: Colt Canada C7 and C8 variants made by Colt Canada are used by the Canadian Forces.
- Central African Republic
- Chile M16A1 used by Chilean Marine Corps
- Colombia
- Congo-Kinshasa M16A1
- Costa Rica
- Czech Republic
- Cyprus: Both M16 and M5 carbine in use. M5 delivered in 2024.
- Denmark: C7A1 variant formerly used by all personnel, but now only serves a role with the Danish royal guards and some volunteers of the Danish home guard.
- Djibouti
- Dominican Republic
- East Timor M16A2
- Ecuador
- Egypt
- El Salvador M16A1/A2/A3/A4
- Estonia Ex-U.S. M16A1s
- Falkland Islands
- Fiji M16A1/A2
- France: Used by counter-terrorism and special operations forces
- Gabon
- Georgia
- Ghana M16A2
- Greece M16A2/A3/A4/M4/A2E M4 is used by the Special Forces of the Hellenic Army, Hellenic Air Force and the Hellenic Navy.
- Grenada
- Guatemala M16A1/M16A2
- Haiti
- Hungary
- Honduras M16A1
- India
- Indonesia M16A1
- Iraq M16A2/A4.
  - Kurdistan M16A4
- Israel M16A1/M16A2E3
- Italy
- Ivory Coast M16A1
- Jamaica M16A1/M16A2
- Japan: M16A1 is used by Western Army Infantry Regiment along with Howa Type 89 rifles.
- Jordan M16A1/A2
- Kenya
- Kuwait M16A1/A2
- Latvia:
- Lebanon M16A1/A2/A4
- Lesotho
- Liberia M16A1/A2
- Lithuania: Lithuanian Armed Forces
- Malaysia Malaysian Armed Forces, Royal Johor Military Force, Royal Malaysia Police, Malaysian Maritime Enforcement Agency and RELA Corps.
- Mauritius
- Mexico: M16A2 is used by the Mexican Marines in the Mexican drug war.
- Monaco: Compagnie des Carabiniers du Prince
- Mongolia
- Morocco M16A1/M16A2/M16A3/M16A4
- Myanmar: M16S1s made by Chartered Industries of Singapore provided secretly in violation of license agreements with Colt.
- Nepal M16A2 and M16A4; captured M16A2 were also used by Maoist rebels of the People's Liberation Army, Nepal during the Nepalese Civil War.
- Netherlands: C7 and C8 variants are used by the Military of the Netherlands and LSW is used by Netherlands Marine Corps.
- Nicaragua: Used by the National Police of Nicaragua and army.
- Nigeria
- North Korea: M16A1 (probably unlicensed copies) used by KPA special forces. Used during the Gangneung incident in 1996.
- Oman M16A1
- Pakistan: M16A1, M16A2.
- Palestinian Authority: Used by Palestinian Security Forces and various local militant forces.
- Panama M16A1.
- Papua New Guinea M16A2
  - Bougainville: Used by Bougainville Revolutionary Army. Captured from Papua New Guinea Defence Force.
- Peru M16A2. M16A1 Used by Navy Special Operation Forces, and by Directorate of Special Operations of the national police.
- Philippines: Armed Forces of the Philippines, Philippine National Police and Bureau of Corrections. Manufactured under license by Elisco Tool and Manufacturing. M16A1s, M653Ps and M16A3 in use. Supplemented in Special Forces by the M4 carbine. Bureau of Jail Management and Penology received 90 units in 2011.
- Portugal: A small number of M16A2s are used by the Special Actions Detachment of the Portuguese Navy.
- Qatar M16A1.
- Romania M16A2
- Senegal: M16A1 and M16A2
- Serbia
- Sierra Leone: 1,000+ M16A1s in use.
- Singapore: Purchased 513 M16s and 25 XM16E1s in 1965–1966. Another purchase of 18,000 M16s and 2,300 civilian variant AR-15s was made in 1967–1968, which ignited controversy in the United States by prioritizing a neutral nation before the U.S. military fighting in Vietnam. Local variant of the M16A1 (M16S1) manufactured under license by ST Kinetics.
- Somalia
- South Africa: Used by Special Forces. Likely received from Moroccan stocks.
- South Korea: Deliveries of XM16E1s began in October 1966 and M16A1s in March 1967 by the United States for the South Korea during the Vietnam War. Also, 1,039,599 M16A1s (Colt Model 603K) were locally produced by Ministry of Defense Arsenal (later privatized to Daewoo Precision Industries and Poongsan Cooperation) at $7 royalty paid per rifle to Colt between 1971 and 1982. (Note: Initial agreement: 600,000; 1st renewal: 900,000; 2nd renewal: 960,000; 3rd renewal: 1,066,000) KATUSA (Korean Augmentation to the U.S. Army) soldiers who serve in the U.S. Army use the M16A2. Retirement from active service began in 2005, and the Reserve Forces alone has 850,000 M16s in possession by the end of 2016.
- Sri Lanka
- Sudan
- Suriname
- Sweden: A small number of M16A2s are used by the Swedish Armed Forces for familiarization training, as well as a similar number of AKMs, but they are not issued to combat units. (Note: Per Svensk: "The foreign weapons kit was purchased in 1986 to give personnel in the Armed Forces the opportunity to get to know the weapons that usually show up in war and crisis situations.") The Automatkarbin 4 and Automatkarbin 5 rifles are used by the Swedish Army.
- Syria: M16A1 and M16A2.
- Taiwan: M16A1, as well as indigenous Type 65/65K1/65K2, Type 86 and Type 91 (with AR-18 style gas piston system).
- Thailand M16A1/A2/A4. A variant of XM177 replica called Type 49 carbine (ปลส.49) Used in South Thailand insurgency.
- Tunisia M16A2/A4
- Turkey M16A1/A2/A4
- Uganda
- Ukraine Multiple M16 variants.
- United Arab Emirates
- United Kingdom: Purchased 100 rifles for troop trials in February 1964 and 5,000 Model 604s in April 1965 for use in tropical conditions. Also issued to special forces and the Royal Marines Mountain and Arctic Warfare Cadre. Later variants in service included the M16A1 and various M16A2 variants. The Colt Canada C8 (L119A1/L119A2) variant is used by Royal Military Police Close Protection Units, the Pathfinder Group, United Kingdom Special Forces and 43 Commando Fleet Protection Group Royal Marines
  - Turks and Caicos Islands: Colt M5 used by Turks and Caicos Islands Regiment.
- United States
  - Baton Rouge Police Department: M16A1
  - Memphis Police Department: M16A1s used by TACT teams during Shannon Street massacre.
  - Minneapolis Police Department: M16A1
  - University of North Florida Police Department
- Uruguay Colt Model 601s.
- Vietnam: Obtained from South Vietnam following Vietnam War Over 946,000 M16s were captured in 1975 alone. XM16E1, M16A1 used.
- Yemen

=== Non-state users ===
- Balochistan Liberation Army
- Democratic Forces for the Liberation of Rwanda
- Free Papua Movement
- Hamas: Used by Hamas militants both in the Gaza Strip and in areas that are under control of the Palestinian Authority.
- ISIL
  - Bangsamoro Islamic Freedom Fighters
  - Maute Group
- Karen National Liberation Army
- Kurdistan Workers' Party
- New People's Army: Captured from AFP and PNP, supplied by sympathizers, or purchased from the black market.
- People's Defence Forces

=== Former users ===
- Used by the Afghan mujahideen during the Soviet–Afghan War.
- Islamic Republic of Afghanistan: Standard issue rifle of the Afghan National Army. Colt Canada C7 variants also saw limited service.
- Australia: M16A1 introduced during the Vietnam War and replaced by the F88 Austeyr in 1989.
- Ba'athist Syria: Captured from rebel groups.
- FARC
- Free Aceh Movement
- British Hong Kong: M16A2 variant. Used by the Royal Hong Kong Regiment.
- Laos: Received from the US government during the Vietnam War and Laotian Civil War.
- New Zealand M16 - replaced in 1988 by Steyr AUG, which was being replaced with a non-Colt M16 variant in 2016.
- Provisional IRA: Received a number of M16s during The Troubles in Northern Ireland.
- Rhodesia: M16A1
- Sandinista National Liberation Front
- South Vietnam: 6,000 M16s in 1966, and 938,000 M16A1s in 1967–1975.
- Soviet Union: Captured Afghan M16A1s used by Spetsnaz GRU.
- Viet Cong: Captured from U.S. and ARVN forces.
- Syrian Democratic Forces
- Syrian opposition
- Zaire

== Conflicts ==
=== 1960s ===
- Vietnam War (1955–1975)
- Laotian Civil War (1959–1975)
- Indonesia–Malaysia confrontation (1963–1966)
- Dominican Civil War (1965)
- The Troubles (late 1960s – 1998)
- Colombian conflict (1964–present)
- Rhodesian Bush War (1964–1979)
- Communist insurgency in Thailand (1965–1983)
- Cambodian Civil War (1968–1975)
- Communist insurgency in Malaysia (1968–1989)
- Moro conflict (1969–2019)
- Communist rebellion in the Philippines (1969–present)

=== 1970s ===
- Araguaia Guerrilla War (1972–1974)
- Armed resistance in Chile (1973–1990)
- Yom Kippur War (1973)
- Lebanese Civil War (1975–1990)
- East Timor conflict (1975–1999)
- Insurgency in Aceh (1976–2005)
- Shaba II (1978)
- Cambodian–Vietnamese War (1978–1989)
- Sino-Vietnamese War (1979)
- Sino-Vietnamese conflicts (1979–1991)
- Salvadoran Civil War (1979–1992)
- Soviet–Afghan War (1979–1989)

=== 1980s ===
- Falklands War (1982)
- Second Sudanese Civil War (1983–2005)
- Sri Lankan Civil War (1983–2009)
- United States invasion of Grenada (1983)
- Thai–Laotian Border War (1987–1988)
- Bougainville conflict (1988–1998)
- Philippine coup attempt (1989)
- First Liberian Civil War (1989–1997)
- United States invasion of Panama (1989–1990)

=== 1990s ===
- Gulf War (1990–1991)
- Somali Civil War (1991–present)
- Yugoslav Wars (1991–2001)
- Sierra Leone Civil War (1991–2002)
- Burundian Civil War (1993–2005)
- Cenepa War (1995)
- Nepalese Civil War (1996–2006)
- First Congo War (1996–1997)
- Second Liberian Civil War (1999–2003)

=== 2000s ===
- War in Afghanistan (2001–2021)
- War in Darfur (2003–2020)
- Iraq War (2003–2011)
- South Thailand insurgency (2004–present)
- Kivu conflict (2004–present)
- Insurgency in Paraguay (2005–present)
- 2006 Lebanon War
- Mexican drug war (2006–present)
- 2007 Lebanon conflict (2007)
- Cambodian–Thai border dispute (2008–2011)

=== 2010s ===
- Militias-Comando Vermelho conflict (2010–present)
- Syrian civil war (2011–2024)
- Infighting in the Gulf Cartel (2011–present)
- Central African Republic Civil War (2012–present)
- 2013 Lahad Datu standoff
- War in Iraq (2013–2017)
- Operation Madago Raya (2016–2022)
- Battle of Marawi (2017)

=== 2020s ===
- Republican insurgency in Afghanistan (2021–present)
- 2021 Beirut clashes (2021)
- Myanmar Civil War (2021–present)
- Russian invasion of Ukraine (2022–present)
- Sudanese civil war (2023–present)
- Gaza war (2023–present)
- 2024 Israeli invasion of Lebanon (1 October 2024 – 27 November 2024)
- 2025 Cambodia‒Thailand conflict (2025)
- 2026 Afghanistan–Pakistan War (2026–present)

== See also ==
- Colt 9mm SMG – Submachine gun manufactured by Colt
- Comparison of the AK-47 and M16 – Comparison of the two most common assault rifles
- List of assault rifles
- List of Colt AR-15 and M16 rifle variants
- List of individual weapons of the U.S. Armed Forces
- Rubber Duck – Training Equipment
- SEAL Recon Rifle – Designated marksman rifle
- Squad Designated Marksman Rifle

Preceded by M14 rifle	United States Army rifle 1967–present	Succeeded by M4 Carbine
