= Parris Manufacturing Company =

American manufacturer of toy guns

The Parris Manufacturing Company of Savannah, Tennessee is an American company that primarily manufactures toy guns.

== History ==
Iowa inventor William G. Dunn (1883–1968) originally owned a hardware business in Clarinda, Iowa. With the start of World War I, Dunn created the Dunn Counterbalance Company that operated out of the hardware store until he built a factory in Clarinda and renamed his company the Dunn Manufacturing Company. Dunn was responsible for 48 patents, 7 to do with wind power. The Dunn Manufacturing Company also built a 3-seat Cruzeaire Monoplane in 1928.

In 1936 Dunn teamed up with Cecil Lewis "Catfish" Parris, a marketing specialist, to form the Parris-Dunn company. The company was formed with Parris as President and Dunn as Vice President to sell a wind driven generator for farms to recharge electrical items. The Dunn Governing Principle was able to use a controllable propeller speed with fewer moving parts than other wind generators. The idea was successful with over 37,000 units created the next year that were sold throughout the USA and foreign countries. Philco Electronics contracted with Parris-Dunn to put their well known name on their "Skychargers" and marketed the items to their customers.

== World War II ==
With surplus American arms sent to England and other countries prior to America's involvement in World War II, the American military suffered a severe shortage of rifles. As the U.S. Government decided that wind generators were not a priority item, Parris-Dunn could only manufacture spare parts for the ones in use. When the company sought some war work the government recommended making dummy training rifles with wood and metal that copied the M1903 Springfield.

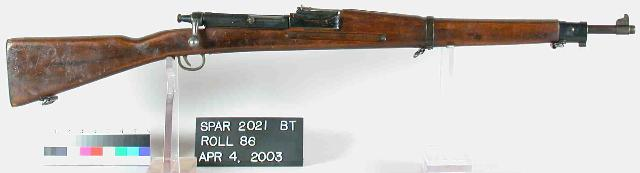
Parris-Dunn U.S. Training Rifle Mk1 Navy

Impressed by the rifles made for the US Army, the US Navy contacted Parris-Dunn in June 1942 to order their own rifles that they insisted have bayonet studs, adjustable rear sights, and working triggers with a clicker mechanism; the weapon becoming the USN MK 1 Dummy Training Rifle. The Navy ordered 190,000 for their first order. A plastic copy of the M1905 bayonet and scabbard was manufactured by the Pro-Phy-Lac-Tic Brush Company who usually manufactured toothbrushes. With walnut in high demand for real rifles, Parris-Dunn used cheaper wood further reducing the cost of the rifles.

Over 500,000 rifles were produced with Parris-Dunn being awarded the Army-Navy ‘E’ Award.

== Postwar ==
With the end of the war, the training rifles were sold as surplus. From 1943, Parris had approached the company's chief engineer, Maurice Greiman with the idea of Parris-Dunn manufacturing toy weapon popguns of a Western style that shot corks for the use of children and traveling carnivals. Parris had Cowboy models called Cowboy Pla Guns, Trainerifles, and Shootrite guns in larger sizes for adults to practice cork gun marksmanship indoors.

Dunn retired in 1949 with Parris moving the company to Savannah, Tennessee where it remains. During the Civil War Centennial the company manufactured replica cork shooting Civil War muskets and pistols.

The company manufactured full size replicas of the M1903 Springfield and smaller sized models for children that featured a working bolt with a dummy bullet, leather sling, the clicker action, and a smaller rubber bayonet similar to the M1 bayonet.

In the 1960s Parris used the cork gun design to make several types of BB guns.

So much of the mail to the Parris Manufacturing Company was missent to Savannah, Georgia that Cecil Parris visited the local post office and had the postmaster add "Catfish Capital of the World" to the postmark.

== Kadets of America ==
In 1953 Parris started the idea of Kadet Military Drill Teams that communities could form. Purchasers of Kadet toy weapons would receive a free comic book drawn by Kurt Schaffenberger for Customs Comics Inc. telling the story of an imaginary boy named Bob Duncan who became a Kadet and advanced to the rank of captain. The comic book featured instructions how to do the American manual of arms and offered the full range of Kadet Trainer Rifles, cork firing weapons, rank insignia, and dress and fatigue uniforms for both girls and boys featuring a white riding helmet. The brochure also featured a Kadet Officer's Training School located on a 200-acre (0.81 km^{2}) farm in Savannah and a Kadet song. From 1953 to around 1970 when the programme ended, the Kadets had over 16,000 members.
