= Uneeda (disambiguation) =

Uneeda was a Nabisco brand from 1898 to 2009.

Uneeda may also refer to:

- Uneeda, West Virginia, United States
- Uneeda, Ontario, a community of Mississippi Mills, Ontario
- Uneeda Doll Company, purveyors of Dollikins and of Wish-nik troll dolls knockoffs
- Uneeda Comix, a 1970 work by Robert Crumb
