= Action Girl =

Action Girl may refer to:

- Dollikins, the UK name for the toy doll line
- Action Girl Comics, a feminist comic book edited by Sarah Dyer
- A counterpart to Action Man made by Mattel in the 60's
