= Johnny Seven =

Johnny Seven may refer to:

- "Johnny 7", a 1986 single by Twenty Flight Rockers
- Johnny Seven (actor) (1926–2010), American actor
- Johnny Seven OMA, a toy weapon
