= Zoomorph (disambiguation) =

Zoomorph is an example of Zoomorphism, the shaping of something in animal form or terms

Zoomorph may also refer to:

- Zoomorphs, a line of educational toys by River Dolphin Toys

== See also ==
- Zoomorphic palette, an ancient Egyptian animal-shaped palette
- Animal style
