= Crescent Toys =

British toy company

Crescent Toys was a British toy manufacturing company in operation from 1922 to 1980.

== Overview ==
Crescent Toys manufactured lead [hollow-cast] figures and animals, die cast metal vehicles, toy guns, hollow cast and later plastic figures and toy soldiers of various historical periods. The firm was founded by Henry Eagles and Arthur Schneider and was located at 67, DeBeauvoir Crescent, Kingston Road, London. Henry George Eagles was one of seven children born of William Eagles, a lifebelt maker, and his wife Emily. At some point in the 1930s, one of Henry's brothers, Arthur, joined the Company under the name of Mr. Harvey (to avoid suspicion of nepotism) and worked as a foreman in the lead casting shop. It was understood that during the early part of the Second World War, Arthur Schneider went to America because of the connotation with Germany that his surname gave. Henry's health deteriorated and Arthur (Harvey) carried more of the responsibility of running the factory aided by Doris Eagles, one of Henry's four children. Henry, known to most of us as 'Harry', died in 1942 and his brother, my father, known as Mr. Harvey, continued to manage the business, which by now was manufacturing munitions' parts. At the end of the war, Henry's two sons, Harry and Ernie, who had served in the armed forces, joined Crescent along with their younger brother Frank and they together with their sister Doris, the Company Secretary, held the controlling interest.

== History ==
Mr. Harvey was given 1,000 shares in Crescent Toy for his caretaker role and purchased a house of some standing in Potter Street, Essex. Die Cast Machine Tools, a small company in Green Lanes, Palmers Green had supplied Crescent with Die Casting Machines and took on casting work subcontracted from them. They soon realised that there was more to be made from selling the finished product than just the parts. In consequence, they used what knowledge they had gained to become fierce competitors in every field that they could.

Meanwhile, with an eye to the development grants then available for industry to move to Wales, Crescent decided to open a factory and my father spent over two years travelling to, and working in, Cwmcarn until the factory was opened in 1949. His co-directors, my cousins, loved Wales and all decided to shut the Tottenham factory and move there. Having spent two years in an area where he said the rain came at you horizontally, dad said he wouldn't move but would continue in Tottenham and supply Crescent with toys cheaper than they would be able to make them in Wales.

Discord between the families got rather bitter and 'Mr. Harvey' set up The Harvey Toy Company in Commerce Road, Wood Green, in the name given to him by his brother many years before. He then sought an alliance with the old enemy - Die Casting Machine Tools - who by then were Trading as Lone Star Products, Californian Screen Blocks, A.G.M. Industries, and several other names. His House in Potter Street had to go and we moved to Abbey Road in Bush Hill Park. Of his three children, Ronald, the youngest, worked in Lone Star's Tool Room alongside 'Smith & Odell' (later of 'Matchbox' fame) my Brother Anthony eventually went into the 'Church', and I ran a Rotational Moulding and Vacuum Forming Company and in more recent years developed a plastics assembly process marketed as PHASA.

The Toy Soldier and Toy Gun Markets seemed as though they were really killed off in America as a consequence of the Vietnam War

Prior to the war, Crescent acquired moulds and stock from C.W. Baker which traded as Reka. Crescent manufactured a series of dioramas depicting various shops and a classroom from 1950s Britain. The company also manufactured Dan Dare sets of figures and Thunderbirds toys.

== See also ==
- Hollow casting
- Toy soldier
