= Dollikins =

Doll brand

Dollikins were dolls manufactured by Uneeda Doll Company, a company founded in 1917 by the Sklarsky family in Brooklyn, New York. Dollikins were marketed as "The World's Most Posable Doll". The dolls were manufactured from 1957 to 1980. Originally, Dollikins were designed to compete with similar 18–21 inch sized dolls that were popular through the 1950s and 1960s, such as Madame Alexander's "Cissy", Ideal's "Revlon", American Character's "Toni", Deluxe Reading's "Candy", Horseman's "Sindy" and "Wonderkin", and Valentine's "Mannikin". The dolls started at 19-20" tall and featured sleepy eyes, although later versions were 12" and 6" without sleepy eyes due to the popularity of the Mattel Barbie Doll, which is 11.5 inches, and the Topper Dawn doll, which was 6 inches.

== Name ==
The Dollikins name was probably inspired by the Miss Dollikins series of books by Anne Jane Cupples, which chronicled a doll's adventures, and were published from 1870 by Thomas Nelson & Sons. The books featured woodcut plate illustrations by R. Patterson and others, and the series was known as The Dollikins Library and The Story of Miss Dollikins. The first four volumes were titled:

1. Her Outset in the World, Her Illness, and Recovery
2. Her Visit to the Seaside and What Came of It
3. Returns from the Seaside to Her Old Life in the Nursery
4. Showing How She Learned to Become a Young Lady

== History ==
Uneeda's original Dollikins doll was 20" tall and had sixteen points of articulation. The doll was advertised as the "Fabulous, Educational Dollikin - The Original Doll Mannikin - A Miracle of Flexibility. Sixteen flexible joints, virtually duplicating all positions of the human body!" and was jointed at the wrists, elbows, biceps, shoulders, waist, hips, knees, and ankles. The bodies were made of hard plastic and the heads were made of vinyl with rooted hair in a variety of colors and styles. They also had 'sleep eyes' that opened and closed. There is no information available to indicate what year each of the different versions of the 20" Dollikin were marketed.

Uneeda used the same head mold, marked "Uneeda 2s", on their non-articulated, 18" fashion dolls as well. A number of hair colors and styles and face paint that were not available on the 20" Dollikin body can be found on the fashion dolls bearing the same head molds. It is not known what years or for how long these straight-legged, hard plastic fashion dolls were produced.

Dollikins were also produced in hard vinyl in a smaller, 15" size. This version of the Dollikins is rare and advertisements of the time indicate that they were only produced for one year, most likely 1957. The 20" and 15" Dollikins were manufactured in Uneeda's factory in Brooklyn, New York.

The original outfits on all these dolls were sophisticated and the packaging was attractive. Original Uneeda Dollikin clothing can be identified by the large, donut-shaped snaps which are marked with the letters "SK LIKITS RAU". Unlike manufacturers of many of the popular, similar-sized fashion dolls of that era, Uneeda did not produce additional outfits to be purchased separately for the dolls.

From 1969 through the early 1980s, Uneeda produced several versions of the Dollikins as an 11 inch, multi-jointed, fashion doll. The dolls came dressed in brightly colored, one-piece bodysuits with multi-colored flowered sashes and plastic boots.

In the UK, the eleven-inch dolls were issued as "Action Girl", "Action Dollikins" or "Action Donna", which were very similar to the US-issued dolls except that on some versions of the doll the eyes were side-glancing and their hair was styled differently. The US dolls had long, straight hair with piece of hair on either side of the face pulled up into a bow on top of the head. The Action Girl dolls had straight hair with no bows, or a curly, side-ponytail. Uneeda marketed a line of clothing to be purchased separately for both the 11-inch Dollikins, available in the US, and for the "Action Dolls" distributed in the UK.

In the late 1950s, Uneeda also sold a "Baby Dollikins", a 21" tall baby doll with eleven points of articulation. It was an infant doll with the same intricate construction as the fashion dolls. Uneeda used the same head mold for this doll as was used on their "Dewdrop" or "Sweetums" doll, and that was also later used on a number of other generic baby dolls of that time period. The doll came with either rooted hair in brown, blonde or red, or molded hair, and was dressed in a one or two-piece pajama set.

Uneeda Doll Company also came out with a 6½" version of the Dollikin fashion doll, similar to Topper's "Dawn" doll called "Little Miss Dollikin" or "Triki Miki". These doll moved the same way as the Larger Action Dollikin doll moved. They came dressed in one piece jumpsuits.

Information is scarce on these dolls as the Uneeda Doll Company changed hands and moved its production overseas.
