= Suzy Homemaker =

Line of toy household appliances produced by Topper Toys

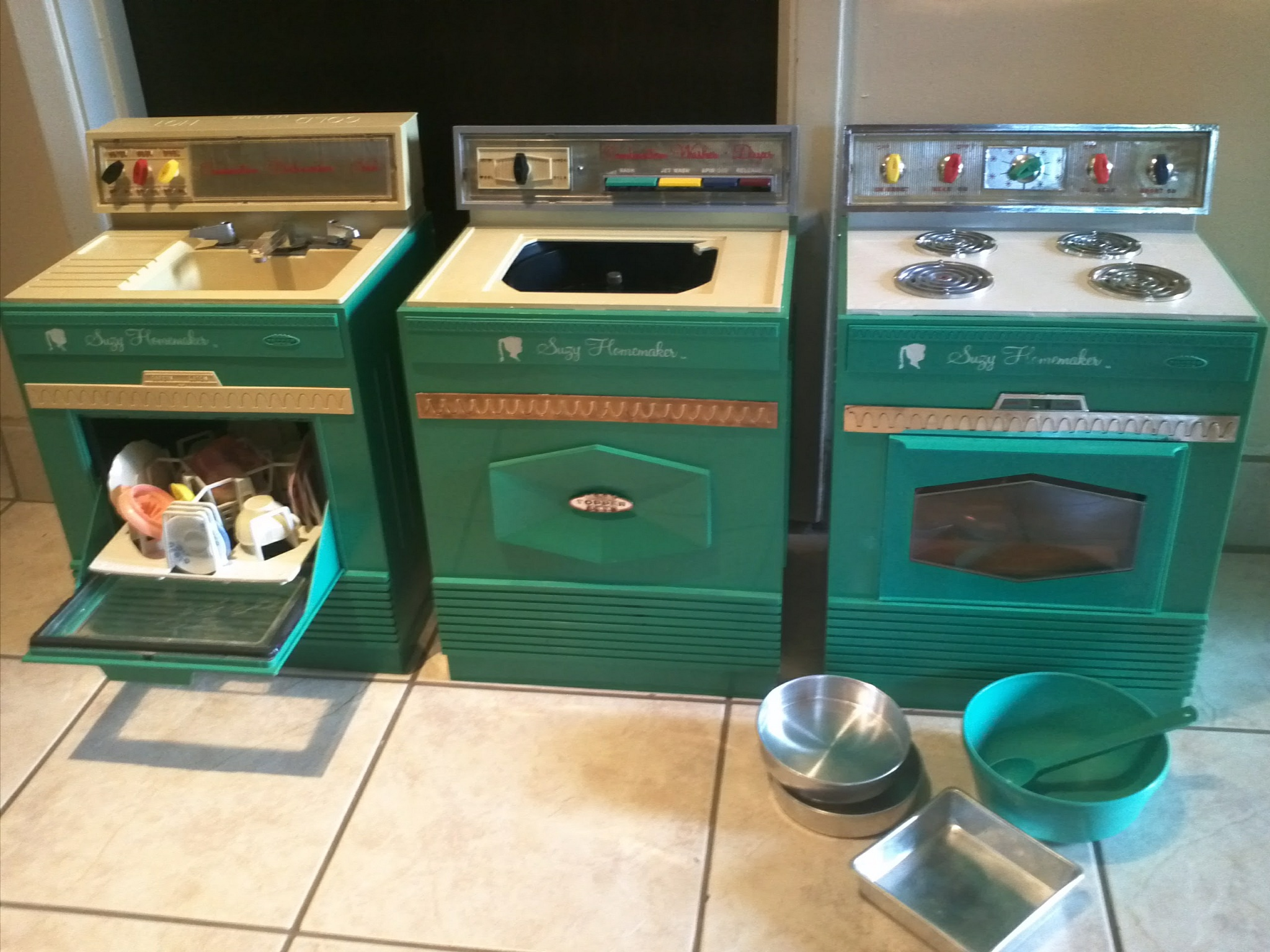
Suzy Homemaker toy appliances

Suzy Homemaker was a line of miniature functional toy household appliances produced by Topper Toys and launched in 1966. Topper Toys created a line of accessory toys to be bought separately, which included items such as a small working oven, a vacuum cleaner, and several other items in addition to a Suzy Homemaker doll introduced later. The term "Suzy Homemaker" has since become a common phrase in American English.

== Doll and accessories ==
Topper Toys introduced the Suzy Homemaker toys in 1966 when the toy market was becoming more diversified by modern manufacturing and marketing. Suzy Homemaker toys became popular, ultimately reaching iconic status in the United States. The doll and toys typified the American suburban housewife and her regular chores, representing a domestic ideal to girls in an era when most women were still homemakers after marriage.

The accessory line by Topper Toys consisted of toy appliances that functioned using batteries or electrical plugs for power. The accessories included: a Budget Blender, Deluxe Grill, Dishwasher-Sink, Hair Dryer, High Speed Mixer, Ice Cream Maker, Ice Delight Maker, Jet Spray Iron, Juicer, Popcorn Popper, Refrigerator, Super Oven, Soda Fountain, Taffy Puller, and Washing Machine.

Suzy Homemaker products were marketed to girls ages 4 to 12. The Suzy Homemaker doll became the second-most popular doll in the United States after the Barbie doll.

One of Suzy Homemaker's competitors was the Easy-Bake Oven line of products.

== Current products ==
Suzy Homemaker products are today being produced and sold as nostalgia items. There are products for adults based on Suzy Homemaker, but given some contemporary humor. The trademark for Suzy Homemaker is owned by J. Lloyd International, Inc.

== Cultural impact ==
The toy appliances and doll became much desired toys among girls from the mid-1960s to the early 1970s. As this generation grew up, "Suzy Homemaker" eventually became an insult directed at women judged as excessively domestic. It was used in this context by feminists initially, to imply that a woman was reactionary and overly conservative in her habits. In this sense, the "Suzy Homemaker" term meant any woman who embodied conventional social expectations without questioning them.

In 1981, Newsweek magazine ran an article on the Future Homemakers of America titled "So long, Suzy Homemaker". Social conservatives have been critical of what they see as a derogatory stereotype.
