= Zoomorphs =

Line of educational toys by River Dolphin Toys

Zoomorphs is a line of educational building toys made by River Dolphin Toys, a Brooklyn-based company. Each set of Zoomorphs contains between 30 and 100 plastic animal pieces that can be snapped together to form actual creatures, such as a cat or dinosaur, or rearranged to create fantasy creatures, such as a dino-cat-horse-bird. Each set's pieces are interchangeable with the pieces of all the other sets. As of late 2006, Zoomorphs were available in nearly 1,100 specialty toy stores.

== Toy Sets ==
There are currently eleven sets of Zoomorphs. There are nine sets based on real animals and two sets of Mythmorphs, which were released in early 2008. The sets are:

- Nightmorphs, which contains a fruit bat, a cat, a desert lizard, a lantern fish, a firefly, and a snake.
- MountainMorphs, which contains a Bluebird, a Bighorn, a Grizzly, and a Mountain King Snake.
- Dinomorphs, which contains a stegosaur, a T-Rex, a duckbill, and a pteranodon.
- Runners, which contains a gazelle, a velociraptor, a beetle, and a cassowary.
- Pets, which contains a pony, a husky, a goldfish, and a lovebird.
- Insects, which contains a red ant, a cave bug, a wasp, and a monarch.
- Rain Forest, which contains a conure, a panther, a crocodile, and a tropical frog.
- Safarimorphs, which contains a lizard, a parrot, a leopard, an elephant, a zebra, and a butterfly.
- Mythmorphs Gold, which contains a unicorn, the Loch Ness Monster, a sea dragon, and a griffon.
- Fossil Morphs, which contains a woolly mammoth, a Brontosaurus, a sea scorpion, and an ancient amphibian.
- Mythmorphs Silver, which contains a phoenix, a pegasus, a wyvern, a golden boar, a capricorn, and a dragon.

== Awards ==
- Zoomorphs received TDmonthly's Top Seller 2007 Award.
- The discontinued Fliers set was nominated for the Family Fun Toy of the Year Award in 2005.
- Zoomorphs was named Best Toy of 2008 in the Construction/Building Category by Leapin' Lizards Toy Co.

== See also ==
- Wooly Willy
- Crescent Toys
