= Crusader 101 =

Electrically-operated toy car

The Crusader 101 was an electrically-operated toy car introduced in 1964 by Deluxe Reading of Elizabeth, New Jersey and produced through 1964. Intended for sale in discount and grocery stores, the Crusader 101 was easily among the largest and most detailed toy cars on the market.

== Description ==
The toy did not represent any specific car. The front featured stacked, forward-sweeping headlights and slightly pointed hood reminiscent of Pontiacs of the period while the inwardly dished grille and crossbar resembled those used on early 1960s Mercurys. The taillights strongly resembled those on 1948-1956 Cadillacs while the rear end and overall styling suggested the 1961 Lincoln Continental convertible rendered in molded red plastic. The highly detailed interior featured white bucket seats with black inserts both front and rear, matching door panels, black "carpeting" and a chrome-plated dashboard and console with legible gauges and radio dial resembling those in the Mercury Monterey. The chrome-plated windshield frame surrounded a green-tinted windshield and was topped by working sun visors.

The Crusader 101 had the additional benefit of size. It measured about three feet in length - or just under one meter - which allowed for some elaborate detail hitherto unseen in a toy car. The trunk had storage space for a spare tire, jack and lug wrench which could be used to actually change a wheel. Twin radio aerials on either rear fender could be raised or lowered by hand. Not only were the sun visors adjustable, the turn signal lever, steering wheel and gear selector could be moved as well. A male driver figure was included with the car - in a relaxed pose at the wheel and was just as detailed as the car itself. He was unpainted beige plastic. A remote control and battery holder shaped like an automatic transmission selector allowed the car to be "driven" per the promise on the box of "YOU DRIVE IT - YOU PARK IT."

Despite its size and level of detail unusual for a toy car, the Crusader 101 was, first and foremost, a toy. The front steering knuckles were prone to breaking, especially if one got a bit too eager with the lug wrench. Electrical problems were common usually manifesting themselves in failed steering control. The windshield frame often warped with age as did the body - though to a much lesser degree - while the vacuum-plated chrome plastic parts tended to turn black. Regardless of its problems, the Crusader 101 is one of the most collectible toy cars of the postwar era. Originally priced at around US$13, prime, mint-with-box examples can easily fetch upwards of $300. The Crusader 101's size has always made it particularly desirable to Barbie collectors since it is well-proportioned to the fashion doll and will easily seat four of them. Deluxe Reading manufactured a "Dream Kitchen" playset during that period that was scaled to Barbie and similar dolls. As such, the Crusader 101 was the subject of the cover story of the December, 2002 edition of Barbie Bazaar magazine.

== See also ==
- Model car
