= The Tigers (action figures) =

Series of military action figures

- Type: Action figures
- Invented by: Topper Toys
- Company: Topper Toys
- Country: United States
- Availability: 1966–1966
- Materials: Plastic
- Features: Soldiers

The Tigers manufactured by Topper Toys were a 1966 short lived series of military action figures. A television commercial advertised the names and functions of the Tigers to the tune of The Washington Post March. Similar to Sgt. Fury and his Howling Commandos, the Sergeant smokes a cigar.

== Description ==
The Tigers were slightly over half the size of the popular G.I. Joe, at 6 1/2 inches (165.1 millimeters) made of a flexible rubber body on a wire frame. Similar to the A. C. Gilbert Company James Bond action figure, each Tiger's right arm was spring loaded hard plastic. When their commander pulled the arm back until it locked, the commander could activate the arm by pressing a hidden button on the back of the figure.

Each Tiger had a cloth uniform of olive green or leopard spot camouflage with a green plastic netted M1 helmet and brown jump boots. Extra uniforms and accessory packs were sold. The figures did not have pistol or cartridge belts or field packs.

== The Tigers and their functions ==
- Sarge - raises a M1911A1 pistol
- Machine Gun Mike - raises a Thompson submachine gun
- Tex - raises an M1 carbine
- Big Ears - raises a walkie-talkie
- Bugle Ben - raises a bugle to his lips
- Combat Kid - throws a Molotov cocktail
- The Rock - throws a hand grenade
- Pretty Boy - salutes

== Accessories ==
- Tiger cannon (fires projectiles) with exploding wall
- Tiger tank (remote controlled and fires projectiles, when hit in a certain location with a projectile, the tank stops and a figure comes out a hatch with his hands up to surrender)
- Barracks
