= Tracer gun =

Type of toy gun

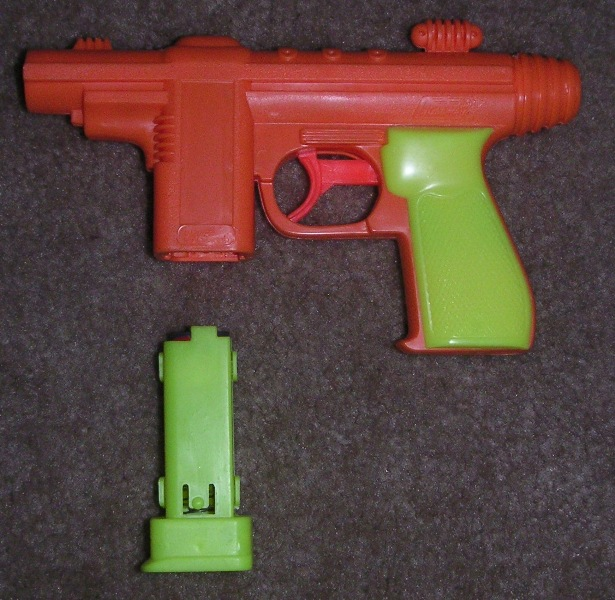
RFDS3816 with removable magazine

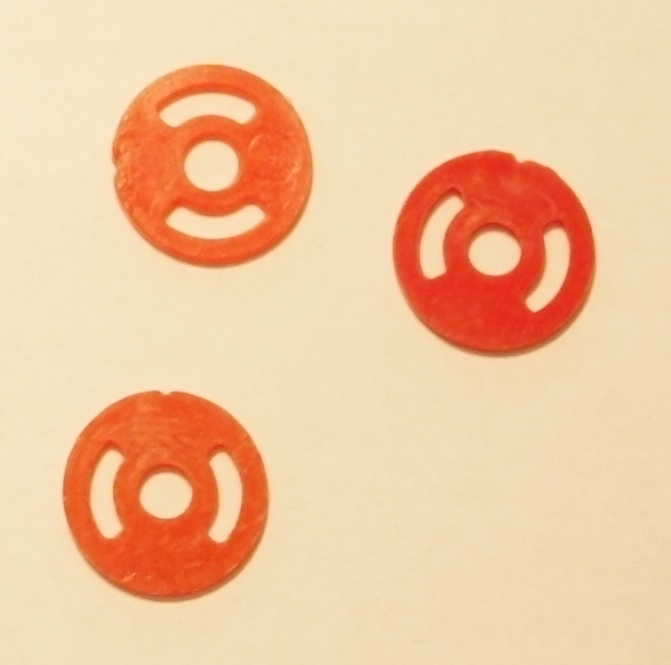
Discs commonly called "tracers" that were shot from tracer guns.

A tracer gun, sometimes known as a disc gun, is a plastic toy gun that shoots lightweight plastic discs roughly the size of a penny. Kids discovered it would also shoot U.S. pennies over a shorter distance. The discs used as ammunition for these guns are often sold with the label "Jet Discs." The firing mechanism is a spring, The magazine holds 20 discs. Range is about 30 feet, and even then, accuracy is far from dependable. The trigger requires some force. The firing sound is a loud, low, and distinctive "snap!".

== Early models ==
The gun was manufactured starting in the 1960s, at which time it was called the "Rapid-Fire Tracer Gun". It was available in greenish bronze or bluish silver. Many of these older guns were made by Ray Plastics Inc. in the United States under the brand name "Rayline". A rifle version of the tracer gun was also made, called the "Jet Disc Tracer-Scope". There was even a collectible Star Trek version, called the "Star Trek Tracer Gun" and "Star Trek Tracer-Scope", first made in 1966 and one of the earliest Star Trek licensed products. All versions, including the rifle, held 20 jet discs in an integrated spring-driven magazine.

The toy, including the Star Trek version, was sold in Canada under the "Grand Toys" brand.

== Later models ==
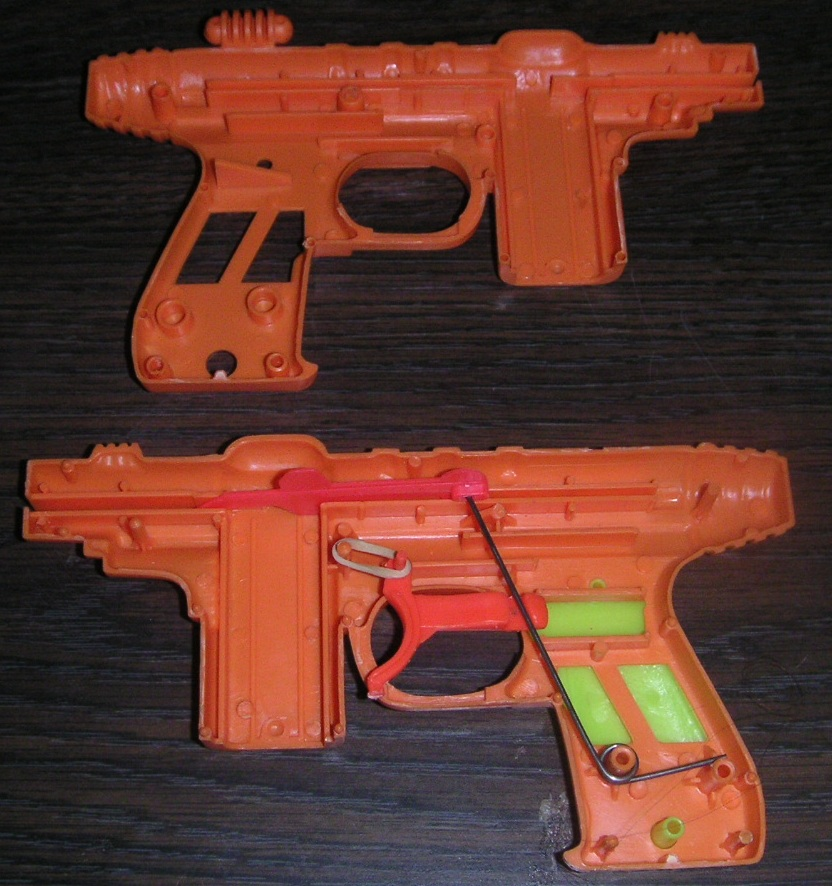
RFDS3816 interior

In the 1990s, Chinese manufacturers produced a new batch of tracer guns based on the original models. Some simply had bright new colors and new names (e.g. "HIT THE TARGET"), but others sported new features. For example, the RFDS3816 "Rapid Fire Disc Shooter", distributed by MAGIC, had removable magazines; the DS3823 "Disc Shooter", by the same company, loaded from the left side instead of the right.

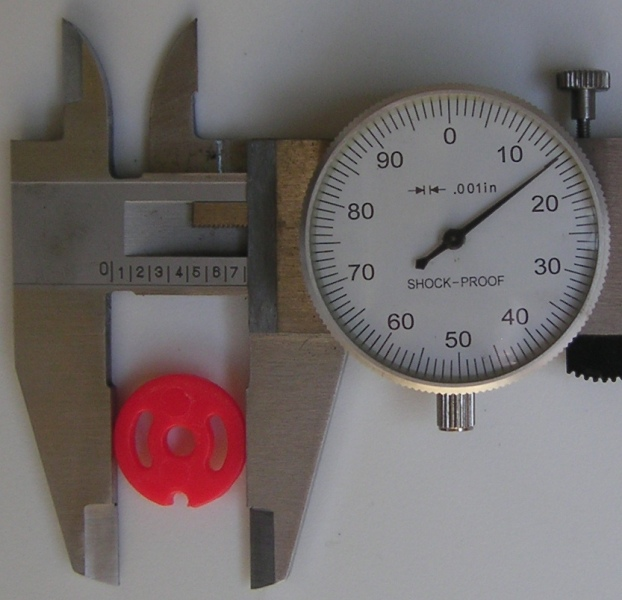
0.815" (smallest) jet disc

The jet discs themselves also varied slightly in size, from as small as 0.815" to as large as the original 0.856".

== Use in the game Assassin ==
Tracer guns have often been used to play a game popular at high schools and colleges known as "Killer," "Killer Tag" or "Killer Assassination" that involves trying to "assassinate" the other players with toy weaponry. Tracer guns suit this kind of game well because they are cheap and easily obtainable, and their bright colors and low firing power (often, a target does not even know a shot has hit) help to address safety issues.
