= Henry Orenstein =

Polish-American toymaker, poker player, and entrepreneur (1923–2021)

- Born: Henryk Orenstein; October 13, 1923; Hrubieszów, Poland
- Died: December 14, 2021 (aged 98); Livingston, New Jersey, U.S.

World Series of Poker
- Bracelet: 1
- Money finishes: 4
- Highest WSOP Main Event finish: 8th, 1995

Henry Orenstein (/ˈɔːrənstiːn/; born Henryk Orenstein; October 13, 1923 – December 14, 2021) was a Polish-born American toymaker, professional poker player, and entrepreneur who resided in Verona, New Jersey.

A Holocaust survivor who spent time in five Nazi concentration camps, he immigrated to the United States as a refugee after the war, and later held more than 100 patents, including for the Transformers toyline. He made his fortune as a toy designer and manufacturer, and was inducted into the New Jersey Inventors Hall of Fame. His family includes his niece Lili Bosse, noted philanthropist and mayor of Beverly Hills, California.

Orenstein played poker professionally in the U.S., and was inducted into the Poker Hall of Fame in 2008. He was also inducted into the New Jersey Inventors Hall of Fame.

== Early life ==
Henryk Orenstein was born in Hrubieszów, Poland; his father was a grain exporter and mother a homemaker. Because he was Jewish, he was deported from his town to Nazi concentration camps, surviving five of them. After the war, he immigrated to the United States.

Orenstein, along with his three brothers and father, had initially fled to Olyka in the then Soviet Union (today in Western Ukraine) after the German army entered Hrubieszów in September 1939. The Orensteins lived in Olyka for two years before returning to their mother and sister in Hrubieszów. Orenstein explained during interviews that his family had built secret hiding spots between double walls, where they evaded authorities. Finally, having exhausted food and water supplies, they turned themselves in.

His parents were loaded onto trucks with other Jews and taken to a cemetery to be shot to death and buried. He and his siblings Felix, Fred, Sam, and Hanka were transported to the Budzyń concentration camp in southeastern General Government (occupied Poland), which was eventually incorporated as a sub-camp into Majdanek concentration camp. Orenstein and his three brothers were also held at Kraków-Płaszów concentration camp in southwestern General Government under the infamous commandant Amon Göth. Orenstein and his brothers were later transferred to Ravensbrück concentration camp in Germany.

While at Budzyń, Orenstein had heard an announcement over the loudspeaker one day that any scientists should register with the office. Figuring this would be a chance for survival, Orenstein signed up his brother and him, although neither had scientific training. By personal account, Orenstein has said that the Nazi German commanders figured out that some who had registered were not scientists, but went along with the ruse to allow them to remain in so-called "research positions" rather than be drafted into the Nazi German infantry.

Orenstein's brother Felix, and sister Hanka, died during their final days of captivity in separate concentration camps at the end of the war. He immigrated to the United States aboard the SS Marine Flasher, a Type C4-class ship used to transport refugees. He joined an uncle on the Upper West Side of Manhattan.

== Business career ==
Orenstein initially found work with the Libby's canned food company. One day he noticed a bride doll in a department store window display, on sale for $29.95 (the equivalent of $362 in 2024). He decided that he could make one that was more affordable and he became a toy manufacturer. After gaining success with his first dolls, he earned his first million dollars and founded Deluxe Reading. Later and better known as Topper Toys, it produced such well-known toys as the "Suzy Homemaker" line of kitchen toys and the Johnny Lightning line of model cars.

Orenstein is credited by former Hasbro CEO Alan Hassenfeld as "the catalyst" for the existence of Transformers: the man who convinced Hasbro to buy the Diaclone and Micro Change toys and repackage them as Transformers. He held more than 100 other patents. Aside from Transformers, the best-known of these inventions is U.S. Patent 5,451,054: a device to detect and display hole cards in poker games.

== Poker ==
In a bid to make televised poker championships more interesting for the audience, Orenstein devised a way in which the players' face-down cards could be seen by the audience: by cutting a window into the tables at each player and having a piece of glass with a camera under it, the audience would be able to better appreciate the game play, while not disturbing the setting for the players. NBC Sports President of Programming Jon Miller said that Orenstein is "single handedly responsible for the success of poker today."

Orenstein was the creator and an executive producer of the Poker Superstars Invitational Tournament on FSN. He also produced the popular TV Show High Stakes Poker, which ran from 2006 to 2007 and 2009 to 2011; old episodes can be seen in the United States on GSN.

He won the $5,000 Seven-card stud tournament at the 1996 World Series of Poker (WSOP), earning $130,000 by defeating fourth-place T. J. Cloutier, third-place Cyndy Violette and runner-up Humberto Brenes. Orenstein twice had finished in the money in the $10,000 WSOP no limit Texas hold 'em Main Event: 12th in 1993 and eighth in 1995.

Orenstein came in seventh in the $2,500 Seven Card Stud event at the 2005 United States Poker Championship. Despite being the oldest competitor (at age 80), he won his first round of NBC's National Heads-Up Poker Championship against one of the best cash-game players in the world, Chip Reese. Orenstein lost in the second round to John Hennigan.

As of 2009, Orenstein's live poker tournament winnings exceeded $200,000. He was a 2008 inductee into the Poker Hall of Fame.

== Death ==
Orenstein died from COVID-19 at a hospital in Livingston, New Jersey, on December 14, 2021, during the COVID-19 pandemic in New Jersey. He was 98 years old.

== Books ==
- I Shall Live: Surviving Against All Odds 1939-1945 (1987), a memoir of his experiences during the Nazi Holocaust and his survival in five concentration camps.
- Abram: The Life of an Israeli Patriot, a biography of Abram Silberstein, who immigrated to Palestine in 1934. He enlisted in the British Army in 1939, rising from the rank of private to major. He was a great help to Ben Gurion.
