= Lone Star Toys =

British toy company

Lone Star Products Ltd. was the brand name used by the British company Die Cast Machine Tools Ltd (DCMT) for its toy products. DCMT was based in Welham Green, Hertfordshire, north of London.

== Company history ==
Starting as early as 1939, DCMT manufactured die cast toys for children. The 'Lone Star' name was chosen because of a demand at the time for toy guns and rifles popular in the Western films in cinemas all over Britain. Eventually, the company also made tie-in toy guns licensed from the James Bond films and The Man From U.N.C.L.E. TV series.

== Toy soldiers ==
Harry Eagles, one of the sons of Henry George Eagles who co-founded Crescent Toys had been known by the nickname of Harvey. When Crescent moved to South Wales in 1949, Eagles remained in London where he started the Harvey Toy Company, producing figures in hollowcast metal. Eagles sold his trade name and designs to Lone Star where a variety of plastic soldiers were sold from 1955 to 1976,

== Vehicles ==
=== Competition with Dinky and Corgi ===
Interpreting the base of a Lone Star vehicle can be difficult. Some of Impy Toys read: "Lone Star Road-Master Impy Super Cars".

To keep up with competitors such as Corgi and Dinky, Lone Star began producing Corgi-sized diecast toy vehicles in 1956 with its Road-Master series (later spelled without the hyphen). Castings on the earlier vehicles, though handsome, were a bit cruder than the competition. For example, the double-deck bus had its casting line, for its two halves, right down the centre of the roof. Also, most earlier Lone Stars have simpler bumper, grille and body detail than Corgi or Dinky.

=== The Impy Series ===
Much changed with the introduction of the Impy line in 1966. Bright new packaging was introduced while the older, larger, Road-Master series was discontinued (though the name "Roadmaster" was still used). The new cars were a smaller three and a half inch size, similar to Mini-Dinkys, and were advertised as the "cars with everything". For example, the 1963 Chrysler Imperial was not offered by any other diecast maker and featured opening doors, hood, trunk, working steering and jewelled headlights. The Impy Jaguar Mark X outshone the spartan Matchbox version with four jewelled headlights and opening 'everything'. Having so many features on a smaller diecast car could be unsightly, however, as cut door lines broke the smooth sides of the car on the Imperial, and other vehicles. On the FIAT 2300S Ghia coupe the cast line was rough and uneven from fender through door to fender again.

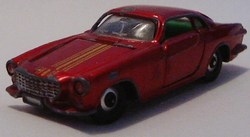
Volvo 1800 coupe. Sometimes door matches were not the best on Lonestar cars - they were a step below Corgi or Dinky in accuracy.

Lone Star was the first toy producer to respond to Hot Wheels' hit of low-friction wheels. In 1968, less than a year after the introduction of Hot Wheels, Impys were refitted with sporty fast wheels which Lone Star now called its "Flyer" series. The first Flyers' wheels were simple shiny silver wheels with black hubs, rather reminiscent of Corgi's first low-friction gold wheels with red hubs. Eventually cars were given a five-spoke wheel By contrast, Topper's Johnny Lightning and Aurora's Cigarbox cars did not change wheel styles until about 1969, nearly two years after Mattel's premier. Similar to Majorette and others, Lone Star also offered gift sets of cars with trailers into the early 1980s, like the Range Rover pulling a zodiac-style inflatable boat.

Earlier Lone Star packaging was coloured similar to Corgi and especially Dinky, with red and yellow box panels. Later packaging was bright - almost luminescent - and Impy boxes were among the first to feature plastic windows, while Matchbox still had closed boxes.

=== Tuf Tots ===
About 1968 or 1969, Lone Star introduced a smaller, approximately two inch long vehicles of varied scales, called "Tuf-Tots", that were simply cast vehicles without opening parts similar in concept to the small Tootsietoys. There were four cars, sixteen trucks, and a couple of other vehicles offered. Cars were a Citroen DS convertible, a '68 Dodge Dart, a Corvette Stingray, and a Mercedes-Benz 280 SL. The first series were all convertibles with plastic drivers in different colours. The second series had no driver and a plastic black roof. Some vehicles of the series were re-released in the mid-1980s as brightly coloured "Zippy Zoomers" and others, like the DS convertible were used by Microlink Industries of Wales in a series named "Mokes" which were tied to a comic book storyline.

== Trains ==
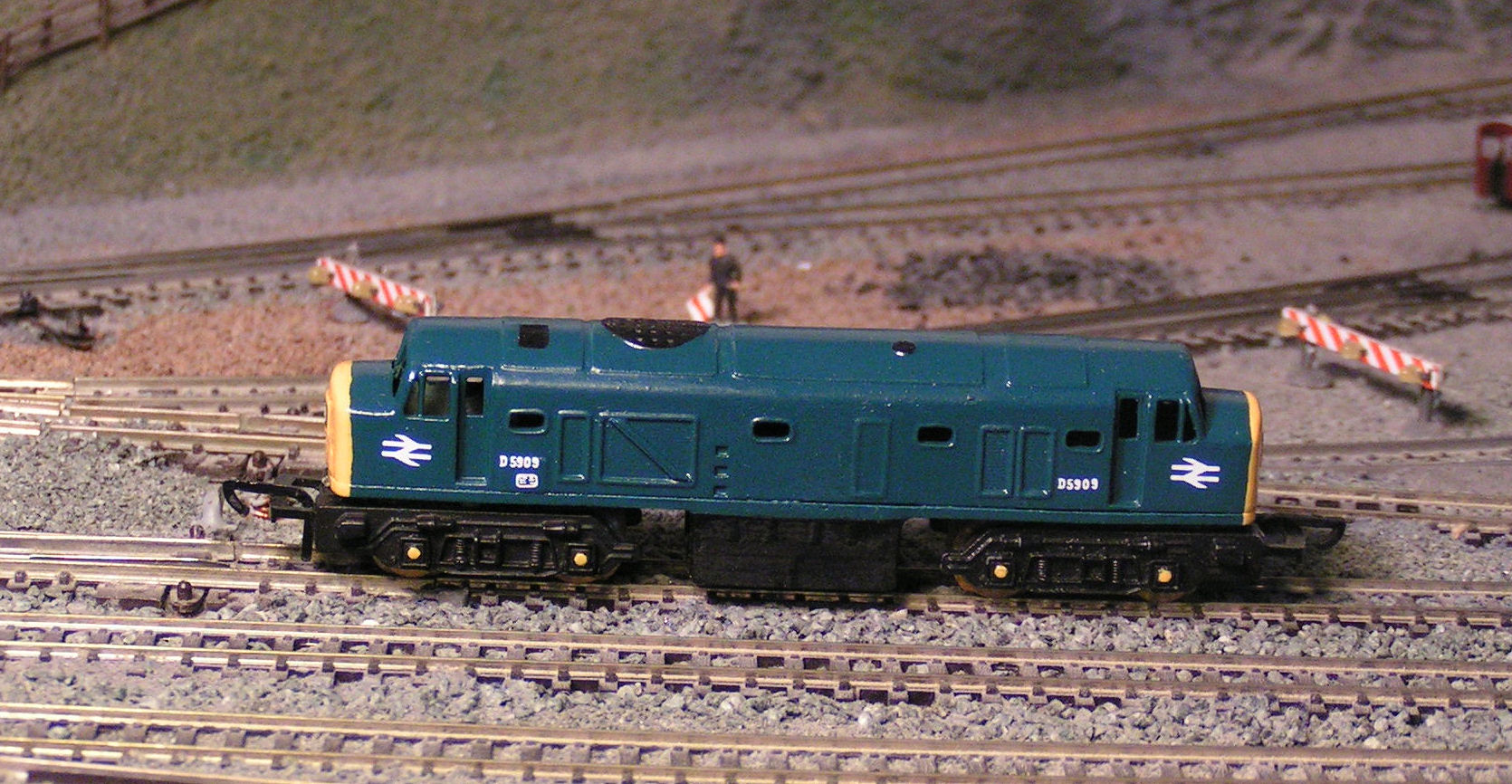
A class 23 "Baby Deltic" Treble-O-Lectric series engine from about 1960.

The company started producing (OOO scale), 2mm to the foot, British and American outline model push-along-trains in 1957. These used 8.25mm gauge metal track and a range of diecast station buildings. This line was designed by long term Lone Star employee Stuart Goss, and followed in 1960 by "Treble-0-Lectric" electrically powered working models of two British diesel locomotives: The Class 24 Sulzer Type 2 diesel, the Class 23 Napier Type 2 "Baby Deltic" diesel, an American Baldwin 0-8-0 Steam Locomotive and an F7 US Diesel Electric which was available in both US and Canadian liveries. These were accompanied by track, British & Continental outline rolling stock, scenic items and other accessories, such as the "Gulliver County" range of rubber moulded buildings in 2mm scale. Vacuum-formed bases were available to form "instant" scenic layouts and these could be purchased separately or in sets.

== Legacy ==
Intellectual property of the 'Lone Star' name is owned by the Heinrich Bauer group and toy guns are still sold under the Sohni-Wicke Armforces und Spielwarenfabrik division of the company.

== Additional resources ==
- Ambridge, Geoffrey S. (July 2002). The Bumper Book of 'Lone Star' Diecast Models and Toys 1948-88. Nielsen BookNet TeleOrdering Service. ISBN 978-0-9539058-0-5.
- Ambridge, Geoffrey S. (March 2011). Toys that time forgot. Nielsen BookNet TeleOrdering Service. ISBN 978-0-9539058-1-2.
- Hammond, Pat, ed. (2008). Ramsey's British Model Trains (6th ed.). Warners Publications plc.
- Johnson, Dana (1998). Collector's Guide to Diecast Toys and Scale Models (2nd ed.). Collector Books, a Division of Schroeder Publishing.
- Ragan, Mac (2000). Diecast Toys of the 1960s. Osceola, Wisconsin: MBI Publishing Company, Enthusiast Color Series.
- Rixon, Peter (2005). Miller's Collecting Diecast Vehicles. London: Miller's, a division of Mitchell Beazley.
