= Pro-Phy-Lac-Tic Brush Company =

- Formerly: Florence Manufacturing Company (1866–1924)
- Company type: Private
- Industry: Health care products
- Founded: 1866
- Founder: George A. Burr; S.L. Hinckley; D.G. Littlefield; I.S. Parsons; George A. Scott
- Fate: Acquired
- Headquarters: Florence, Massachusetts, United States
- Products: Toothbrushes, toilet brushes, mirrors, aluminum goods
- Owner: Lambert Pharmaceutical Company (from 1930)

Pro-Phy-Lac-Tic Brush Company was a health care business established in 1866 in Florence, Massachusetts.

== History ==
The Florence Manufacturing Company was founded in 1866 by George A. Burr, S.L. Hinckley, D.G. Littlefield, I.S. Parsons, and George A. Scott. In its early years, the company produced lockets, mirrors, and toilet brushes. By the late 1890s, they were making toothbrushes, aluminum goods, toilet items made from wood, composition brushes, and mirrors. The company changed its name to Pro-Phy-Lac-Tic Brush Company in 1924.

The Wall Street Journal reported the company was the largest producer of toothbrushes in the United States in 1924. The company opened a factory in Shanghai, China, with 600 workers in the early 20th century to manufacture brush bristles to send to the Florence location for final production. Makers of a highly advertised Pro-phy-lac-tic toothbrush, the company was acquired by the Lambert Pharmaceutical Co. on February 19, 1930, the then-owners of Listerine. From 1887–1924, the corporation paid a regular dividend on its common stock.

During World War II, the company manufactured dummy plastic bayonets for the USN Mk 1 Dummy Training Rifle for the U.S. Navy.
