= Deluxe Reading =

American Toy Company

- Formerly: Deluxe Toy Creations (1953), Deluxe Reading Toys; Deluxe Topper Toys
- Founded: 1951
- Founder: Henry Orenstein
- Fate: Went into bankruptcy in 1973, followed by liquidation in the late 1970s
- Headquarters: Elizabeth, NJ, United States
- Products: Scale model cars, toy weapons, dolls, toy robots, action figures, board games,
- Brands: Johnny Lightning (1969–71); Johnny Seven OMA; Dawn doll; Suzy Homemaker

Deluxe Reading was a United States toy and board game manufacturer based in Elizabeth, New Jersey. The company was founded in 1951 as "Deluxe Toy Creations" by Henry Orenstein, and was bought and sold (and renamed) numerous times before running into financial difficulties in the early 1970s. After a failed 1971 attempt to take the company public, Topper Toys struggled, and was forced into bankruptcy in 1973 when its subsidiary Educational Toys, Inc., lost its contract to produce Sesame Street-themed toys. Its final assets were ultimately finally liquidated in the late 1970s.

The company produced toys under several brand names including: Johnny Lightning (scale model cars, released in 1969), Johnny Seven OMA (toy weapon), Dawn doll, and Suzy Homemaker. It is best known for its own brand name in the 1960s, "Topper"

Other products manufactured and commercialized by Deluxe Reading included toy robots, board games, and action figures.

== Overview ==
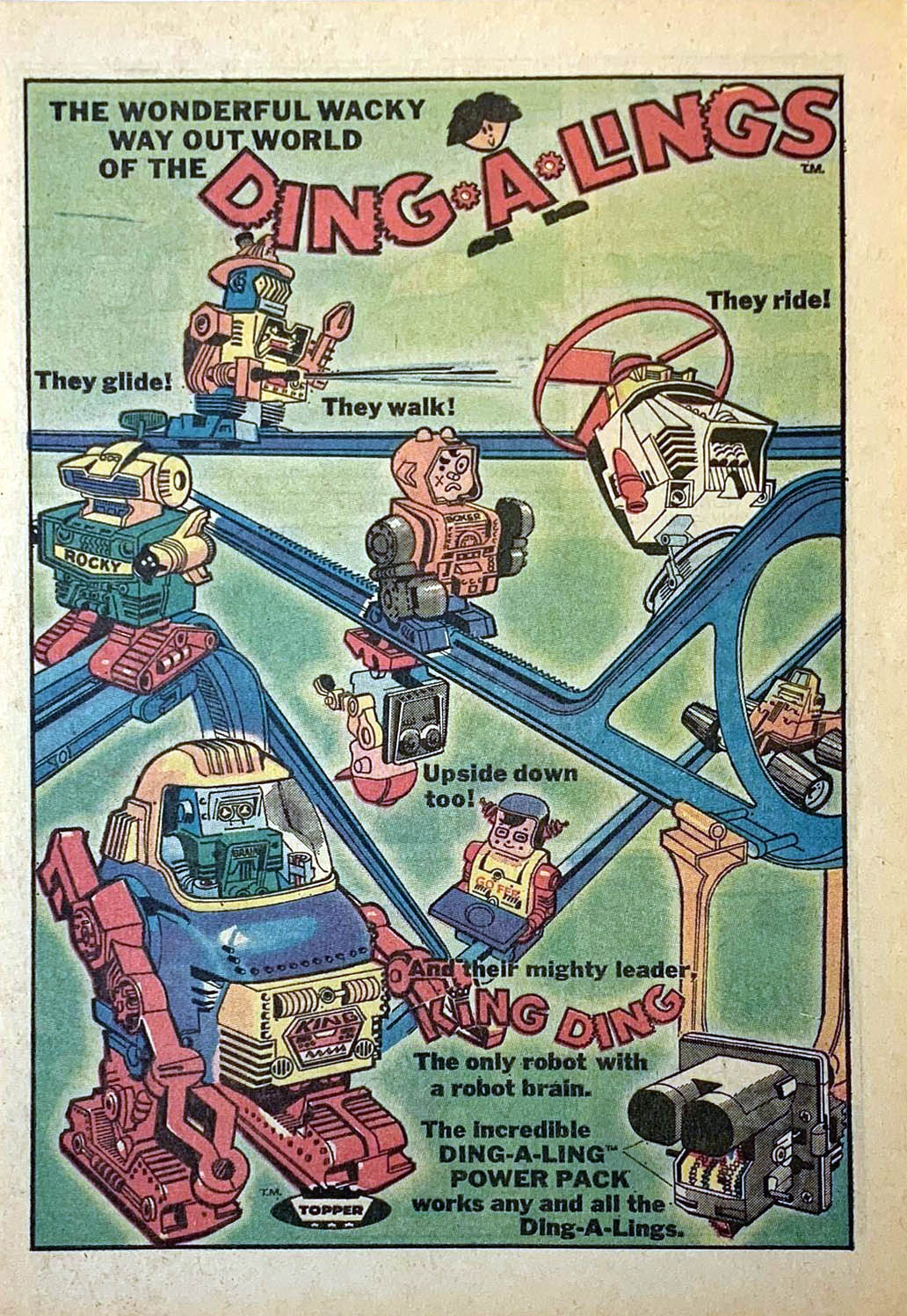
Illustrated ad for the Ding-A-Ling toy robot line, 1971

The company was established by Henry Orenstein as "Deluxe Toy Creations" in 1951. In late 1950s, Orenstein sold the company for $2 million (although he continued in charge of the business), and the name was changed to "Deluxe Reading Toys". Orenstein would buy back the company in 1966 for $49 million, naming it the "Deluxe Topper Toys" name.

For boys, the Johnny Seven O.M.A (launched in 1964) and Johnny Lightning (launched in 1969) toys were the most popular; for girls, the Dawn Doll. Deluxe Reading dolls were sold in the 1950s–1970s through supermarkets and are often referred to as Grocery Store Dolls. They were an inexpensive alternative to department store dolls, although of similar quality. Another successful toy for girls was the "Dream Kitchen" (circa 1961) which consisted of four 12-inch-tall colorful kitchen appliances, a kitchen table and four chairs. This toy was unique in that the sink worked with water, the oven contained batteries which revolved a plastic turkey on a spit inside the oven, the refrigerator had pull-out shelves, and the dishwasher also worked with water.

Also included were scores of food boxes, cleaning supplies, food replica items, plates, utensils and more. The box proclaimed that it held "176 pieces." The size of the set perfectly matched the size of Barbie, a toy doll which was wildly popular at that time. As of 2014, this kitchen toy set can be seen on sale (used) for up to $400.

The toys were packaged in large, colorful boxes that could be easily seen atop grocery store shelves. The top shelf is typically unusable for typical grocery items and this sales gimmick was used by Deluxe Reading as a selling point to retail store owners. The large, electrically operated Crusader 101 toy car is an example of the marketing concept.

The company was the first to manufacture Sesame Street dolls officially licensed by Children's Television Workshop and Henson Associates, until its financial problems caused CTW and Henson to terminate the contract with then Topper Corporation subsidiary Educational Toys Inc., in January 1973. The cancellation forced Topper Corporation into Chapter IX bankruptcy in Manhattan Federal District Court. At the time, it listed liabilities of $32,795,000 and assets of $14,152,000, with $14,244,000 owed to banks. According to company president Henry D. Clarke Jr., these figures (through November 30, 1972) did not include those for Educational Toys, Inc., which only produced the Sesame Street toy line.

The Topper Toys trademark and assets were liquidated in the late 1970s, with the marks and toy molds purchased by Jay Horowitz of American Plastic Equipment, who later transferred all rights to American Plastic Equipment's subsidiary, American Classic Toys.

== Notable toys ==
=== Board games ===
- Charley n' Me (Note: Included a toy robot that connected to the board.)
- Fat Sam
- Fingers Harry
- Silly Safari

=== Dolls ===
- Baby Magic (doll)
- Candy Fashion (doll)
- Dawn Doll
- The Go-Go's
- Lil Miss Fussy
- Lillie Doll
- Penny Brite Doll (1963)
- Sesame Street (1970–73) (Note: Under license.)
- Suzy Cute Doll (Topper Toys 1964)

=== Vehicles ===
- Battlewagon (ship)
- Crusader 101 (car)
- Johnny Express (truck)
- Johnny Lightning (cars)
- Johnny Speed (construction kit)
- Johnny Toymaker (various)
- Tiger Joe (tank)

=== Weapons ===
- Defender Dan (machine gun)
- Johnny Eagle
- Johnny Seven OMA (rifle, 1964)
- Multi-Pistol 09 (1965)
- Secret Sam (spy kit) (Note: It consisted of a From Russia with Love type briefcase that contained several toys, including guns and working camera using 127 film.)
- Secret Sam Pipe Shooter
- Secret Sam Spy Accessories
- Sixfinger (plastic finger)

=== Toys ===
- The Chief (firetruck and figures)
- Clock-A-Word
- Ding-A-Ling (toy robot)
- Dream Kitchen (c. 1961)
- Funny Face
- Jimmy Jet (military aircraft)
- Johnny Astro
- Johnny Spacemobile X-7
- Johnny Service (repair shop) (Note: Included a model car)
- Motorized Monster Maker (kit)
- Mr Pierre
- Operation X-500 (rocket launcher with base, 1960)
- Playmobile Dashboard (1961)
- The Tigers (military action figures, 1966)
- Super Helmet (1966)
- Suzy Homemaker Oven
