= Toy gun =

Imitation weapons made for playing

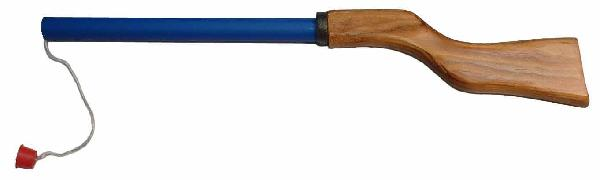
Pop Gun, 2009

Toy guns are toys which imitate real guns, but are designed for recreational sport or casual play by children. From hand-carved wooden replicas to factory-produced pop guns and cap guns, toy guns come in all sizes, prices and materials such as wood, metal, plastic or any combination thereof. Many newer toy guns are brightly colored and oddly shaped to prevent them from being mistaken for real firearms.

== Types ==
=== Wooden guns ===
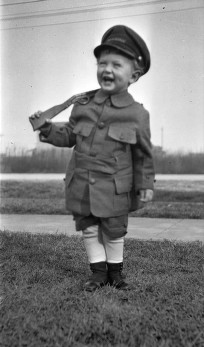
Boy with wooden toy gun, 1920s

Wooden guns are made to resemble real guns. Often handmade, these toys may or may not have metal parts and are made with various levels of detail.

=== Suction cup darts ===
Suction cup dart toy pistols are made to resemble real pistols, used to fire one suction cup dart.

=== Rubber band guns ===
Rubber band guns are toy guns used to fire one or more rubber bands (or "elastic bands"). Rubber band guns are often used in live-action games such as Assassins, in which they are common and popular toy weapons. They are also common in offices and classrooms. Rubber band guns have been popular toys that date back to the invention of rubber bands, which were patented in England on March 17, 1845, by Stephen Perry.

=== Cap guns ===
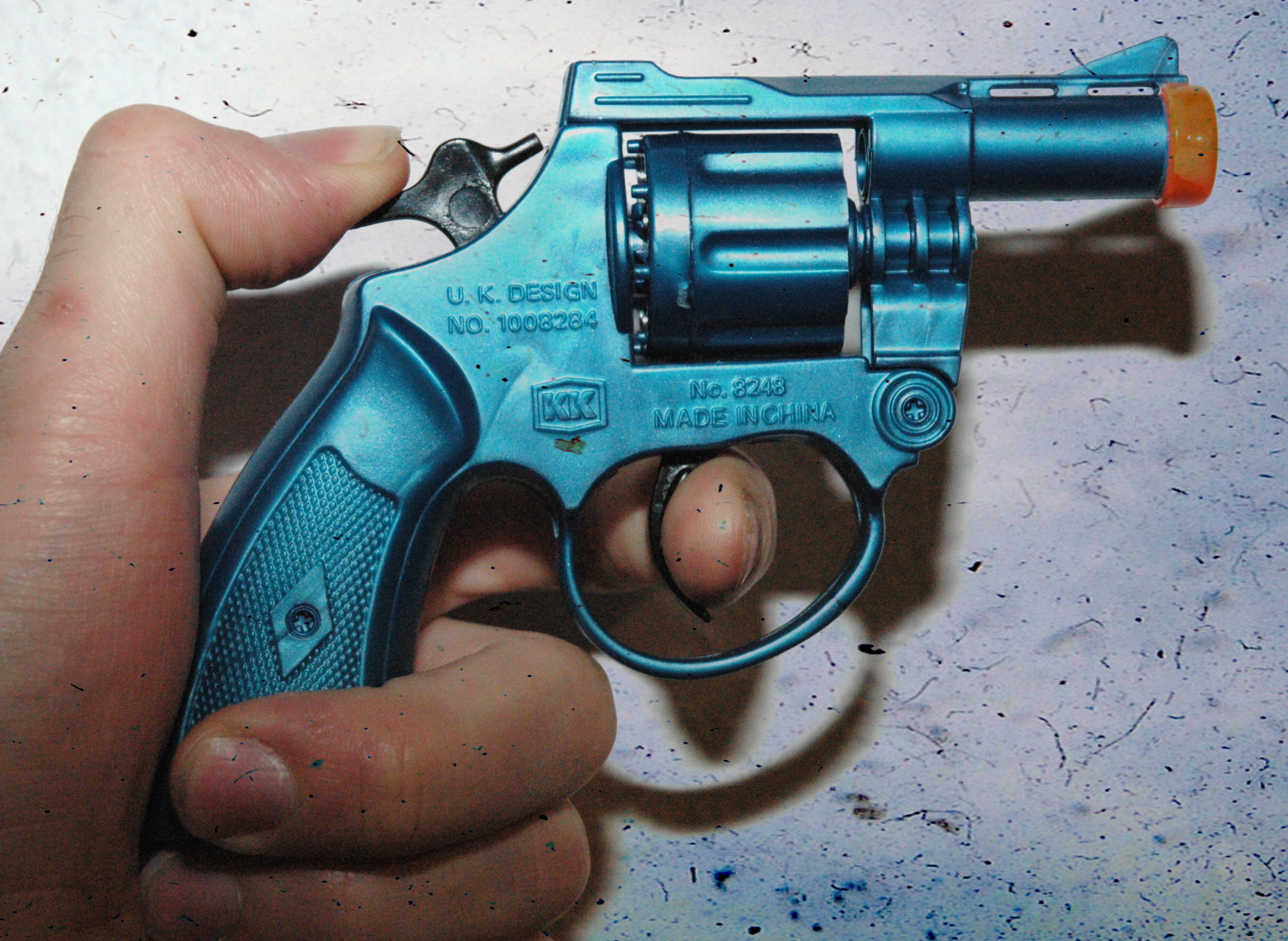
An orange-tipped cap gun with its hammer drawn back, 2008

Cap guns, cap pistols, or cap rifles are toy guns that create a loud sound simulating a gunshot and a puff of smoke when a small percussion cap is exploded. Cap guns were originally made of cast iron, but after World War II were made of zinc alloy, and most newer models are made of plastic.

=== Model guns ===
Model guns are Japanese full-size toy guns that highly replicate the appearance, design, and operation of the real ones but cannot shoot any projectile. It comes as either ignition models (a very sophisticated type of cap guns) or non-ignition dummy models. Both are subject to the strict Japanese Gun Control Law for identification and to prevent possible modification.

=== Theatrical prop guns ===
Prop guns are toy guns that have to look like real guns. They are commonly used in movies, TV shows, and other theatrical performances.

=== Spud guns ===
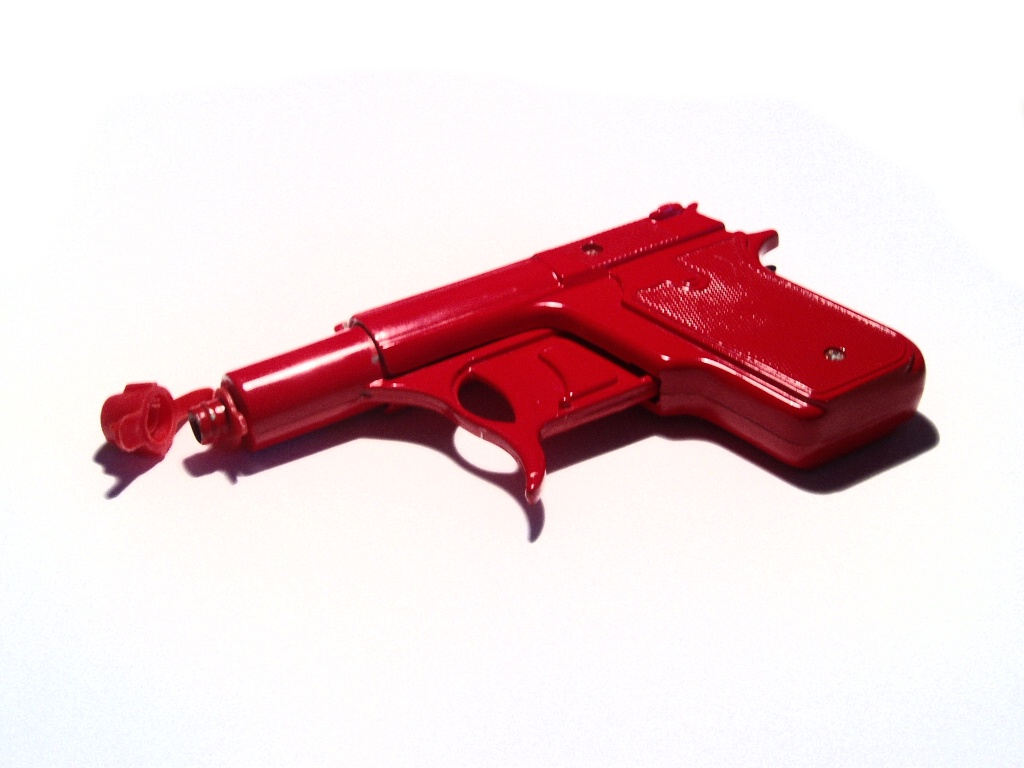
A typical factory-made toy die-cast spud gun. The cap attached to the muzzle converts it into a water pistol, 2007.

Spud guns are small toy guns used to fire a fragment of potato. To operate, one punctures the surface of a potato with the gun's hollow tip and pries out a small pellet which fits snugly in the muzzle. Squeezing the trigger causes a small build-up of air pressure inside the toy which propels the projectile. The devices are usually short-range and low-powered.

=== Water guns ===
Cross section of a typical water gun, 2006

Water guns are a type of toy gun that uses a variety of methods to spray jets of water. Many early small water guns used the same trigger based pumping mechanism used for spray bottles. In this type of device, the trigger actuates a positive displacement pump shaft. With the aid of two check valves, often using small balls, fluid is drawn into the pump from a reservoir, then forced out the nozzle upon squeezing the trigger.

The simplicity of the spraying mechanism allowed these toys to be manufactured cheaply and allowed the majority of the body to be used as the reservoir. The primary limitation of this design is the volume of water that can be effectively moved per pump. Increasing pump volume would require more user effort to push the fluid out, making larger designs impractical. However, this technology remains widely used today both in spray bottles as well as small water guns that can be found in a wide variety of shapes and colors.

=== Pop guns ===
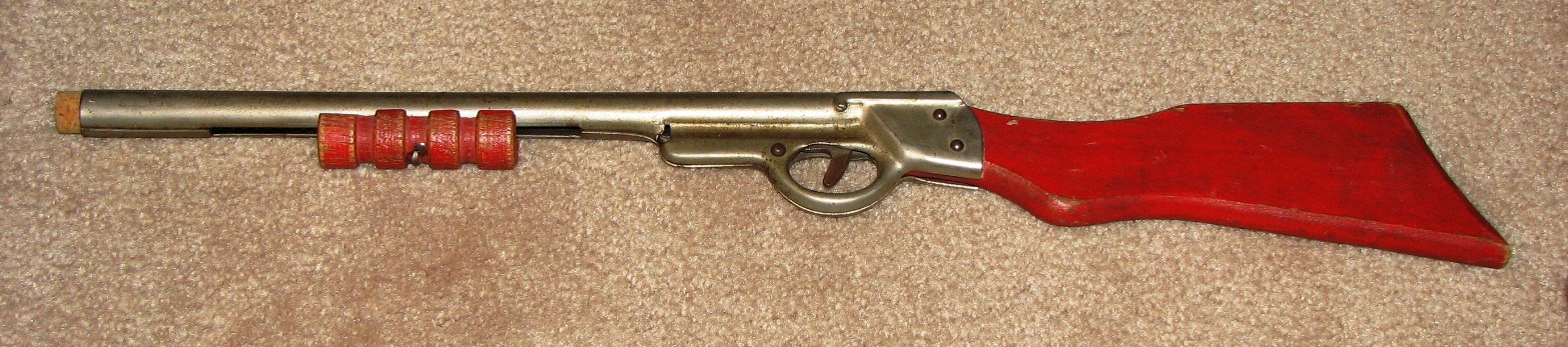
Vintage 1950s Toy Cork Rifle ("Pop Gun") by All Metal Products, 2013

The pop gun is a toy gun that was made by American inventor Edward Lewis and uses air pressure to fire a small tethered or untethered projectile (such as cork or foam) out of a barrel, most often via piston action though sometimes via spring pressure. Other variants do not launch the obstruction, but simply create a loud noise. This mechanism consists of a hollow cylindrical barrel which is sealed at one end with the projectile and at the other with a long-handled plunger. In this type, the plunger is rapidly forced down the barrel, building up internal air pressure until the projectile is forced out with the "pop" sound that lends the toy its name.

=== Ray guns ===
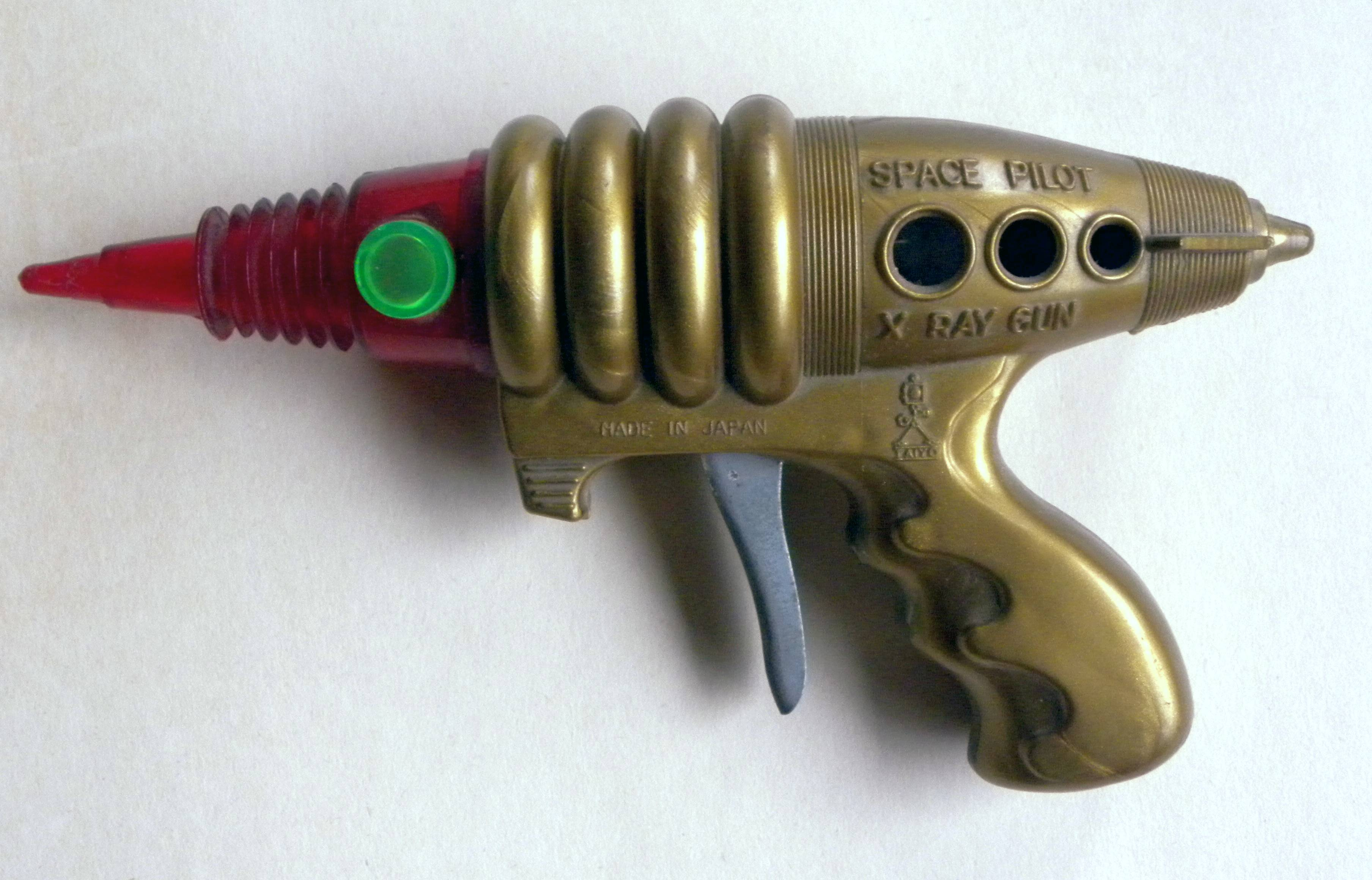
Space Pilot X Ray Gun, 2009

In fiction, ray guns are a science fiction particle-beam weapon that fires what is usually destructive energy. In most stories, when activated, a raygun emits a ray, typically visible, usually lethal if it hits a human target, often destructive if it hits mechanical objects, with properties and other effects unspecified or varying.

Toy ray guns often have a mechanical component that sparks, light-up and make a sound effect.

=== Tracer guns ===
Tracer guns, sometimes known as disc guns, are a kind of toy gun made of durable plastic. The toy shoots lightweight plastic discs roughly the size of a penny. The discs used as ammunition for these guns are often sold with the label "Jet Discs." The firing mechanism is a spring. The magazine typically holds around 20 "discs." The range is about 10 feet, and accuracy is far from dependable. The trigger requires some force. The firing sound is loud, low, and distinctive. Oftentimes the trigger will become loose and will take multiple attempts to shoot.

=== Foam dart blasters ===
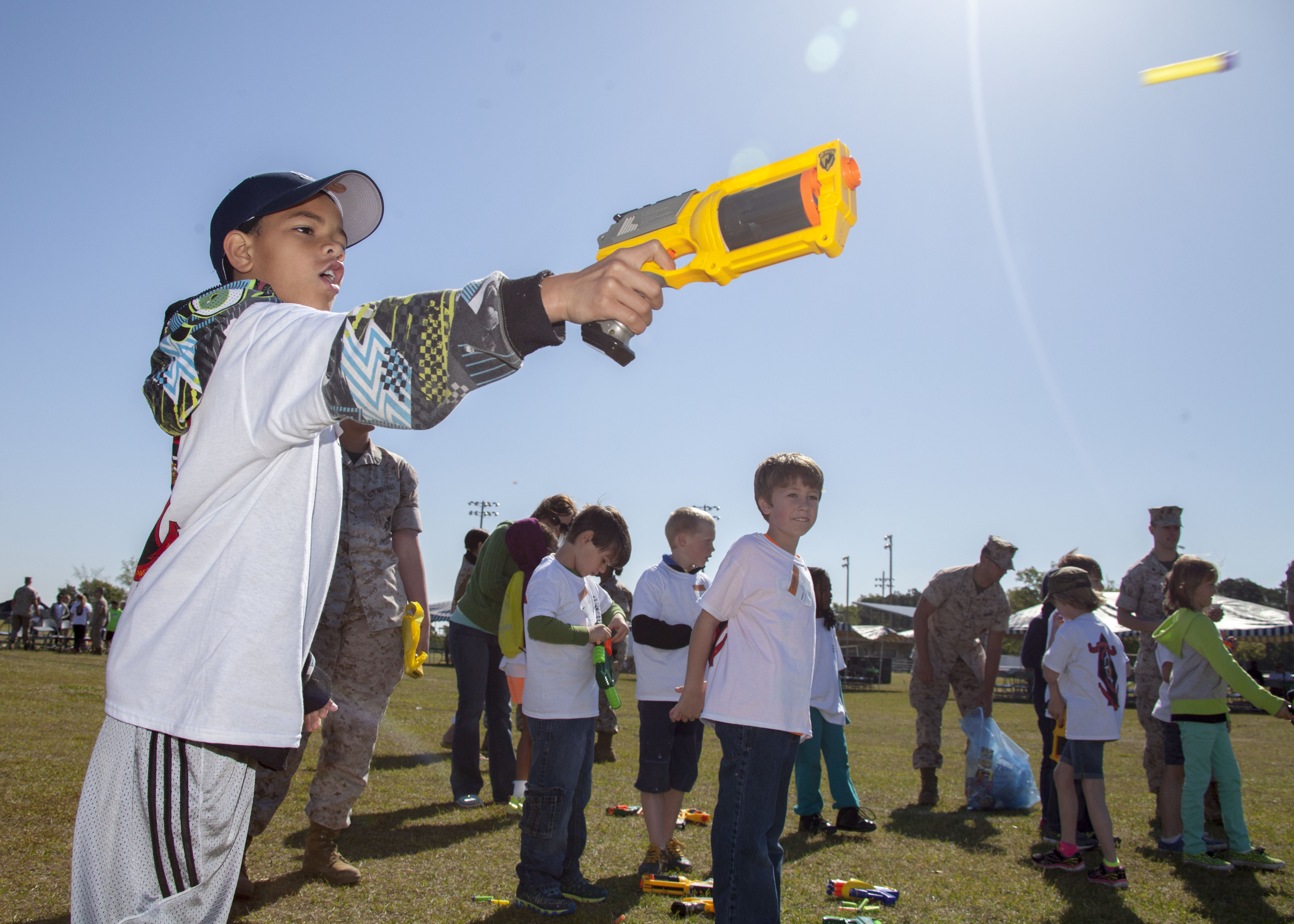
Children firing Nerf blasters at a mock shooting range

Foam dart blasters are toy guns that fire foam darts, discs, or foam balls. The term "Nerf blaster", referring to blasters made by Hasbro, is often used as a blanket term for any foam dart blaster, regardless of whether or not it has the Nerf brand name. Foam dart blasters are manufactured in multiple forms, including pistols, rifles, and light machine guns.

The first Nerf blasters emerged in the late 1980s with the release of the Nerf Blast-a-Ball and the Arrowstorm.

=== Airsoft guns ===
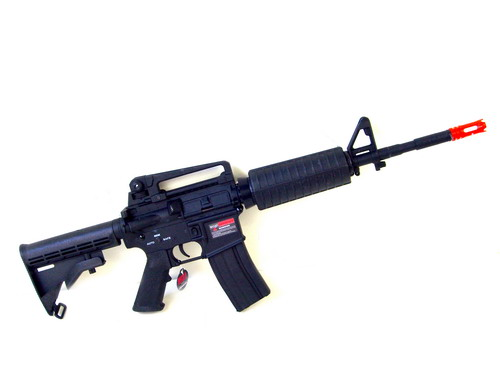
Airsoft M4A1 replica, 2007

Airsoft guns are replica toy guns used in airsoft sports. They are essentially a special type of very low-power smoothbore air guns designed to shoot non-metallic spherical projectiles often colloquially (and incorrectly) referred to as "BBs", which are typically made of (but not limited to) plastic or biodegradable resin materials. Airsoft gun powerplants are designed to have low muzzle energy ratings (generally less than 1.5 J or 1.1 ft⋅lbf) and the polymer pellets have significantly less penetrative and stopping powers than conventional air guns, and are generally quite safe for competitive sporting and recreational purposes if proper protective gear is worn.

MilSim is a major element of appeal for airsoft guns, and airsoft games rely heavily on an honor system, where a player has the ethical obligation to call himself out of play when hit.

=== Gel blasters ===
Gel blasters are replica toy guns similar in design to airsoft guns but much less powerful, and shoot superabsorbent polymer (most commonly sodium polyacrylate) water beads (often sold commercially as garden moisture retainers) which are hydrated into 6–8 mm (0.24–0.31 in)-diameter projectiles colloquially called gel beads or gel balls.

Gel blasters are invented as a replacement toy for regions with airsoft-unfriendly laws (e.g. China, Australia, Malaysia and Vietnam), and are often played in CQB-style shooting skirmishes similar to paintball, but follows an airsoft-like honor-based gameplay umpiring system.

=== Paintball gun ===
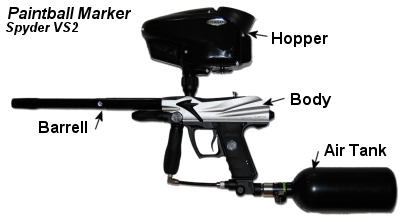
Spyder VS2 Paintball Marker Gun, 2008

Paintball gun, paint gun, or marker gun, is the main piece of paintball equipment in the sport of paintball. Markers use an expanding gas, such as carbon dioxide (CO_{2}) or compressed air, to propel paintballs through the barrel and quickly strike a target. The term "marker" is derived from its original use as a means for forestry personnel to mark trees and ranchers to mark wandering cattle.

=== Light guns ===
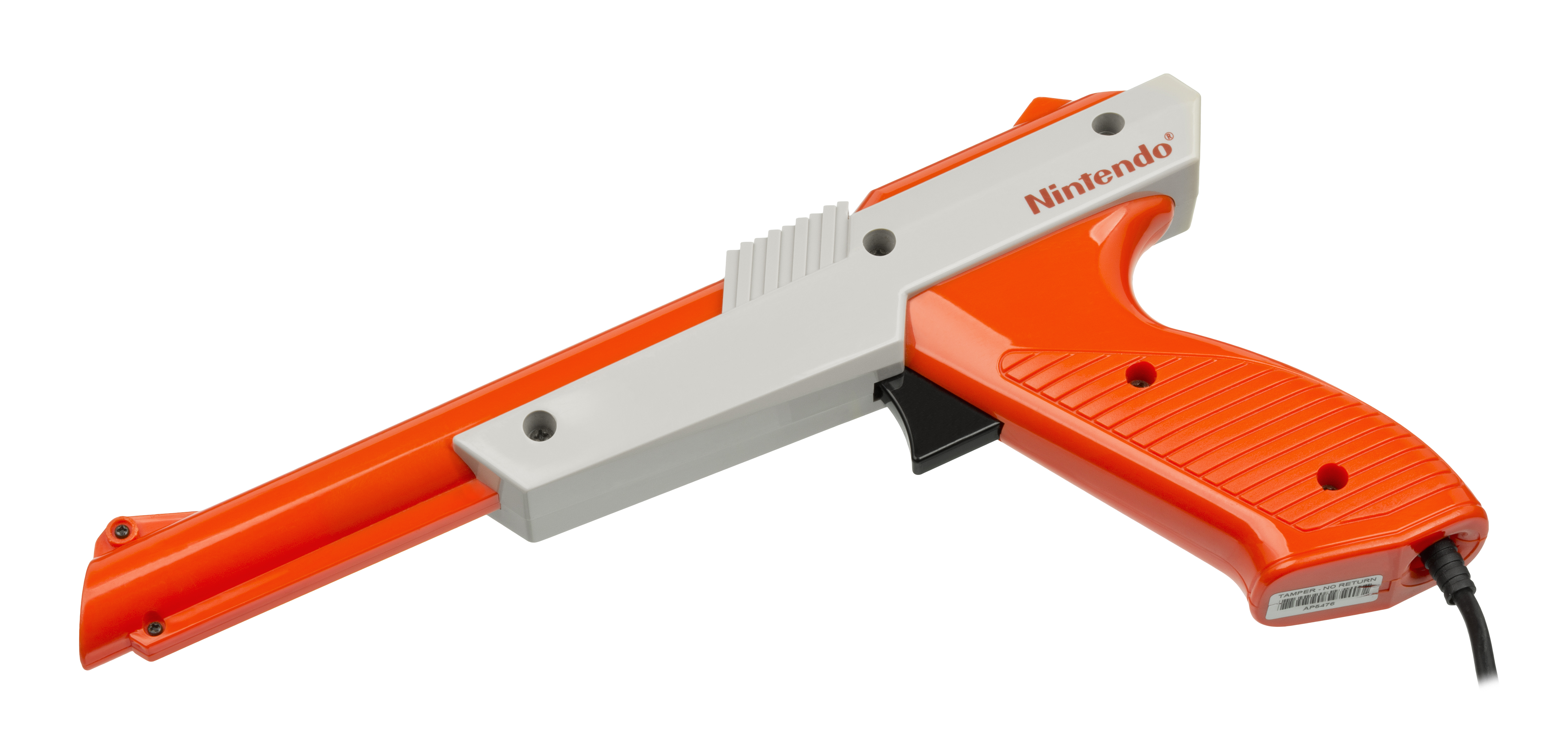
The NES Zapper, Nintendo's early light gun, 1989

Light guns are pointing devices for computers and a control device for arcade and video games, typically shaped to resemble a pistol. Modern screen-based light guns work by building an optical sensor into the gun, which receives its input from the light emitted by on-screen target(s). The first device of this type, the light pen, was used on the MIT Whirlwind computer. Modern starting pistols in athletics use similar devices that emit a sound and flash a light.

=== Laser tag gun ===
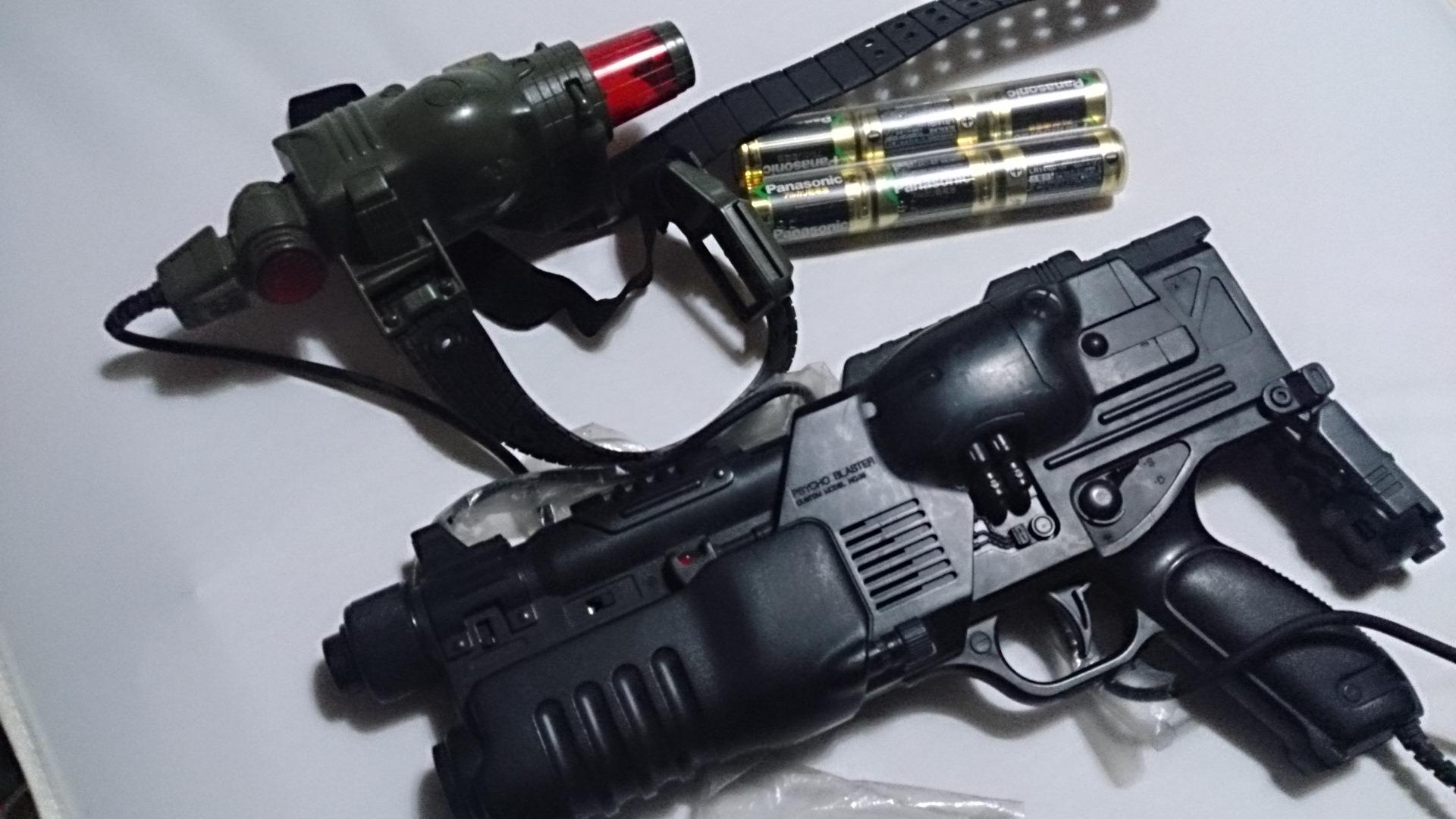
Laser tag gun and sensor, 2014

Laser tag gun is a tag game played with toy guns which fire infrared beams. Infrared-sensitive targets are commonly worn by each player and are sometimes integrated within the arena in which the game is played.

Since its birth in 1979, with the release of the Star Trek Electronic Phasers toy manufactured by the South Bend Electronics brand of Milton Bradley, laser tag has evolved into both indoor and outdoor styles of play, and may include simulations of combat, role play-style games, or competitive sporting events including tactical configurations and precise game goals.

Laser tag is popular with a wide range of ages. When compared to paintball, laser tag is painless because it uses no physical projectiles, and indoor versions may be considered less physically demanding because most indoor venues prohibit running or roughhousing.

=== Dummy guns ===
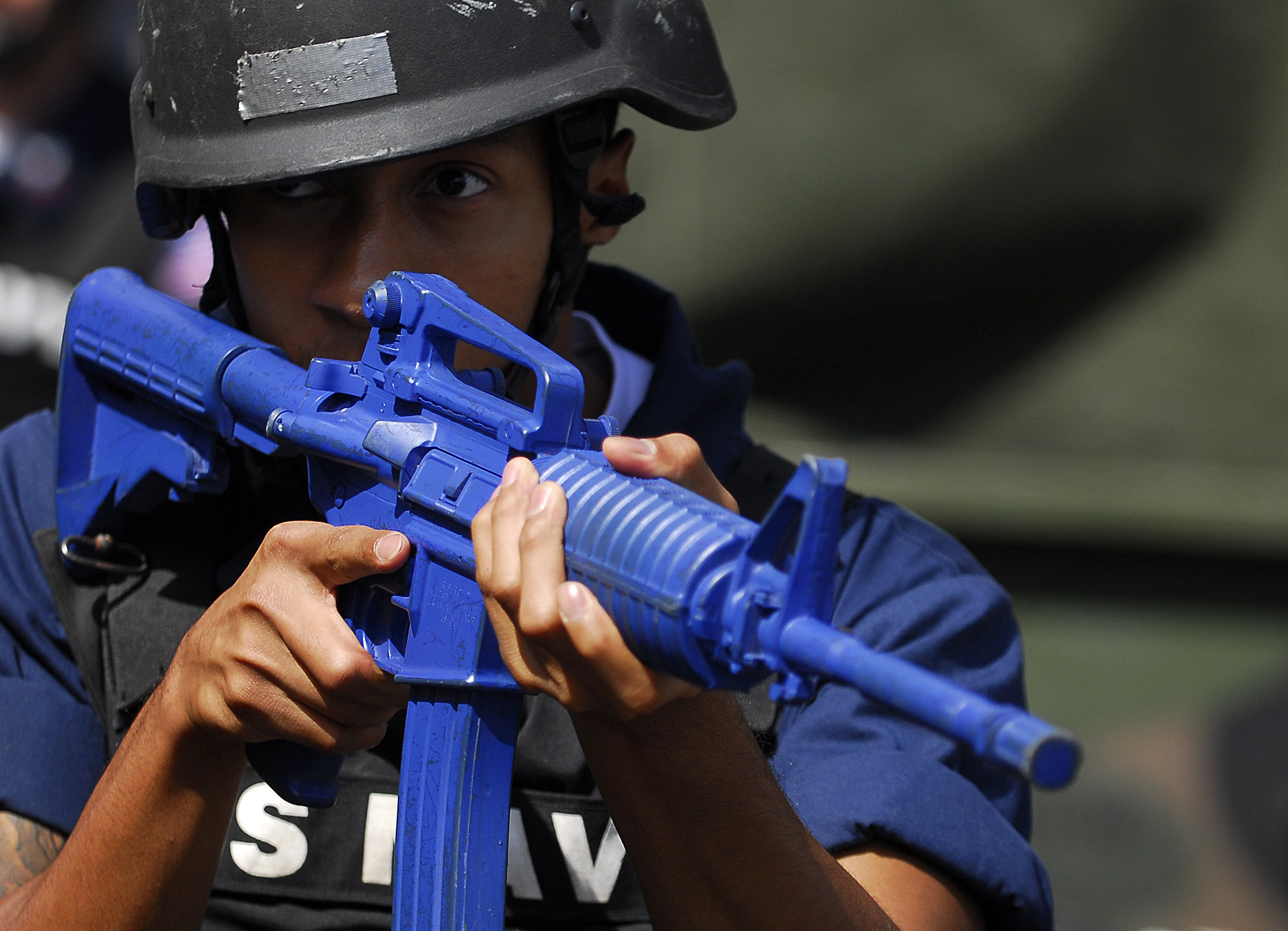
U.S. Navy sailor training with an M4 "blue gun". USS Harpers Ferry, Subic Bay, Philippines, 2009

Dummy guns have been historically used by police and military organizations for training purposes. During World War II, Parris Manufacturing Company provided over 2 million accurate copies of the M1903 Springfield rifles, the MK 1 USN Dummy Training Rifle to the U.S. armed forces. After the war they continued to manufacture and sell their replicas as toy guns. As well as smaller sized models for children that featured a working bolt with a dummy bullet, leather sling, the clicker action, and a smaller rubber bayonet similar to the M1 bayonet.

Today, the United States military, calls these dummy training guns "rubber ducks" or "blue guns", usually resembling an M16 type rifle. Trainees are issued rubber ducks before they have been properly trained to use actual rifles, in order to become familiar with the care, responsible handling, and added weight of an M16 during various activities, such as bayonet drills, water survival, and marches. They are also used to train soldiers in various ceremonial practices that differ when soldiers are armed. For example, standing at attention requires a different stance and set of movements when the soldier has a rifle in-hand.

== Popularity and proliferation ==
Handmade toy rubber-band gun, 2019

Imitations from real-life objects are a part of most modern childhoods. Hand-carved wooden replica or factory-produced pop guns and cap guns are commonly used among children of various ages and social background, with prices ranging from cheap to expensive toy guns.

With the influence of Hollywood and comic strips, tie-ins could make an ordinary toy gun a major bestseller. In the 1930s Daisy Outdoor Products came out with a Buck Rogers Rocket Pistol (1933), Disintegrator Pistol (1934), and Liquid Helium Pistol (1935) that sold in record numbers.

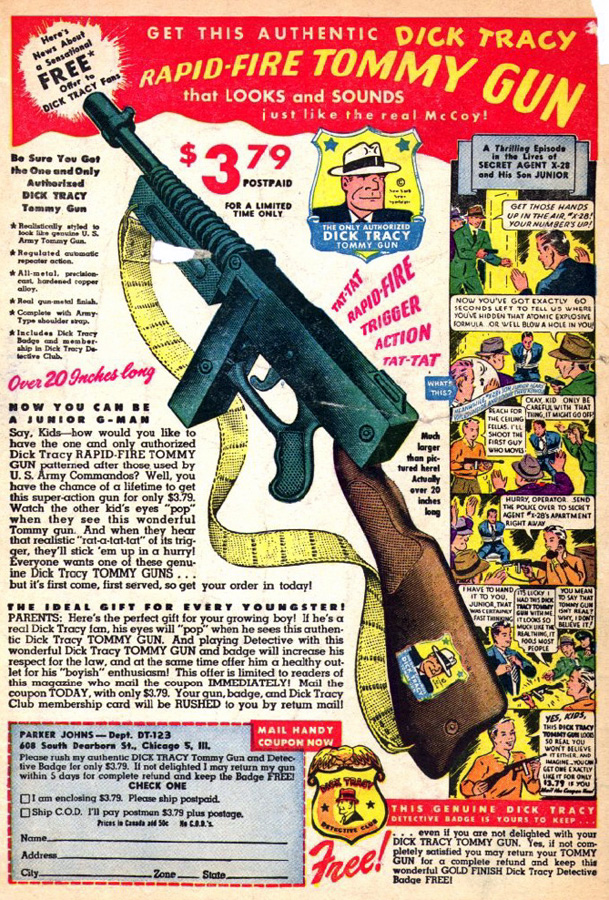
Advertisement for Dick Tracy Rapid-Fire Tommy Gun, 1947

Mattel had used television advertising to sell their "burp gun" on The Mickey Mouse Club in the mid-1950s to great effect. In 1959 Mattel sponsored their own television show Matty's Funday Funnies with their trademark little boy "Matty" showing cartoons and advertising their products. Mattel toys came out with Dick Tracy weapons in 1960 that were state of the art. Not only could the "Dick Tracy Crimestoppers" have a realistic snubnosed revolver in a shoulder holster, but Mattel also boosted junior law enforcement firepower with a Dick Tracy cap firing tommy gun that fired a burst of 6 caps automatically when the M-1 Thompson-style bolt was pulled back. One commercial featured Billy Mumy demonstrating the weapons to his father prior to watching Dick Tracy on TV. Mattel also came up with a "Dick Tracy Water Jet Gun" that was a miniature replica of a police pump action shotgun that fired caps when one pulled the trigger and squirted water when one pumped the slide. When the Dick Tracy craze faded the same two weapons were reissued in military camouflage as Green Beret "Guerrilla Fighter" weapons. (see United States Army Special Forces in popular culture). Mattel later issued the same tommy gun in its original colours as a Planet of the Apes tie-in complete with ape mask.

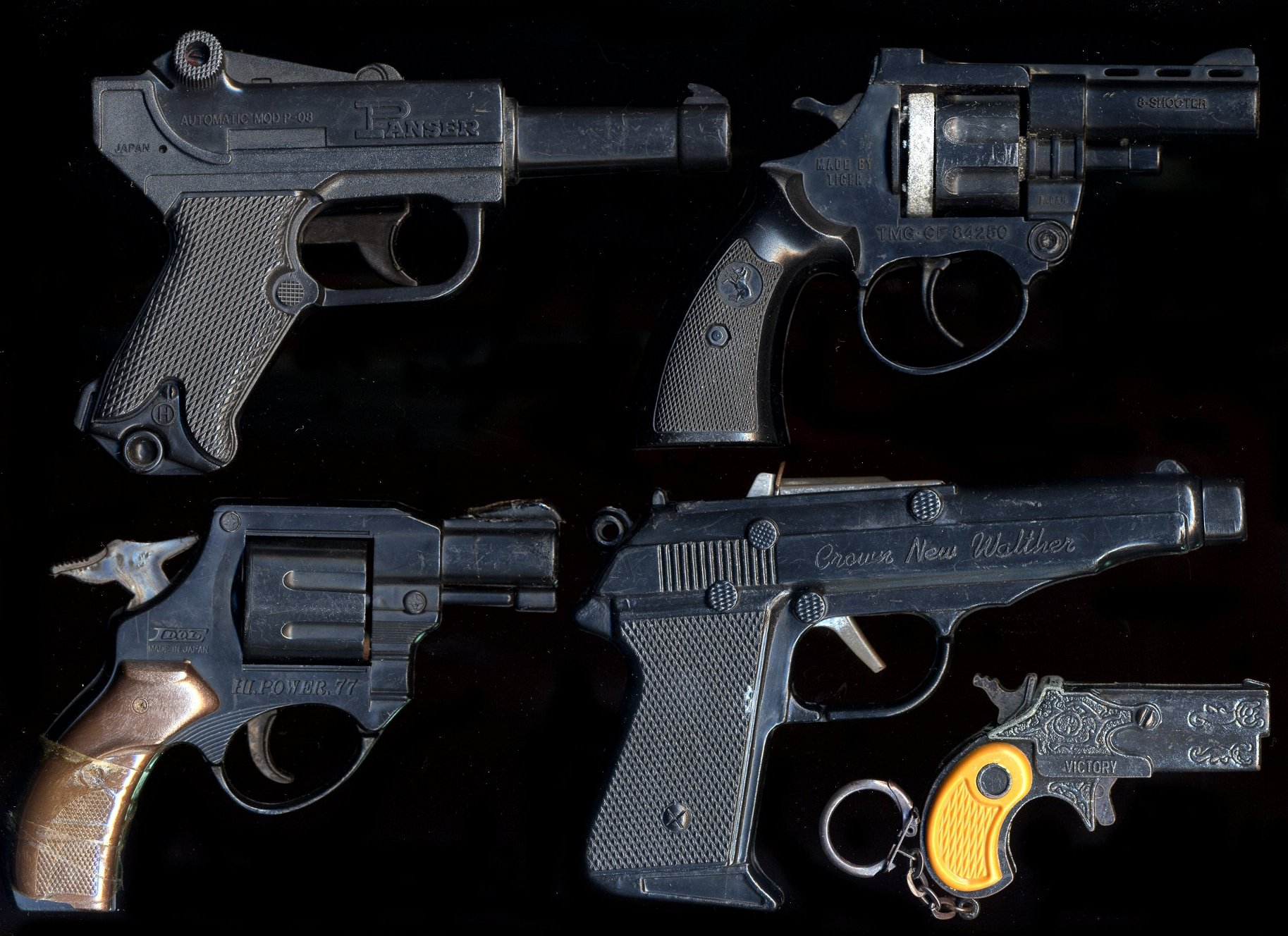
Cap guns, 2005

In the mid-1960s, Multiple Toymakers/Multiple Plastics Corporation (MPC) came out with James Bond's attaché case from From Russia with Love. Topper Toys replied with a copy called "Secret Sam" that featured a toy gun that fired plastic bullets through the attaché case and had a working camera that outsold 007's kit. MPC toys replied with a "B.A.R.K" - "Bond Assault and Raider Kit" an attaché case that opened up to display a firing mortar and a rocket shooting pistol. MPC also provided a "Bond-O-Matic" water pistol. Bond's television competition The Man From U.N.C.L.E. had their pistol with attachments that turned it into a rifle made by both the Ideal Toy Company in the US and the Lone Star Toys company in the United Kingdom. Mattel came out with a series of "Zero-M" secret-agent weapons such as a camera turning into a pistol and a radio turning into a rifle demonstrated by a juvenile Agent Zero M played by Kurt Russell.

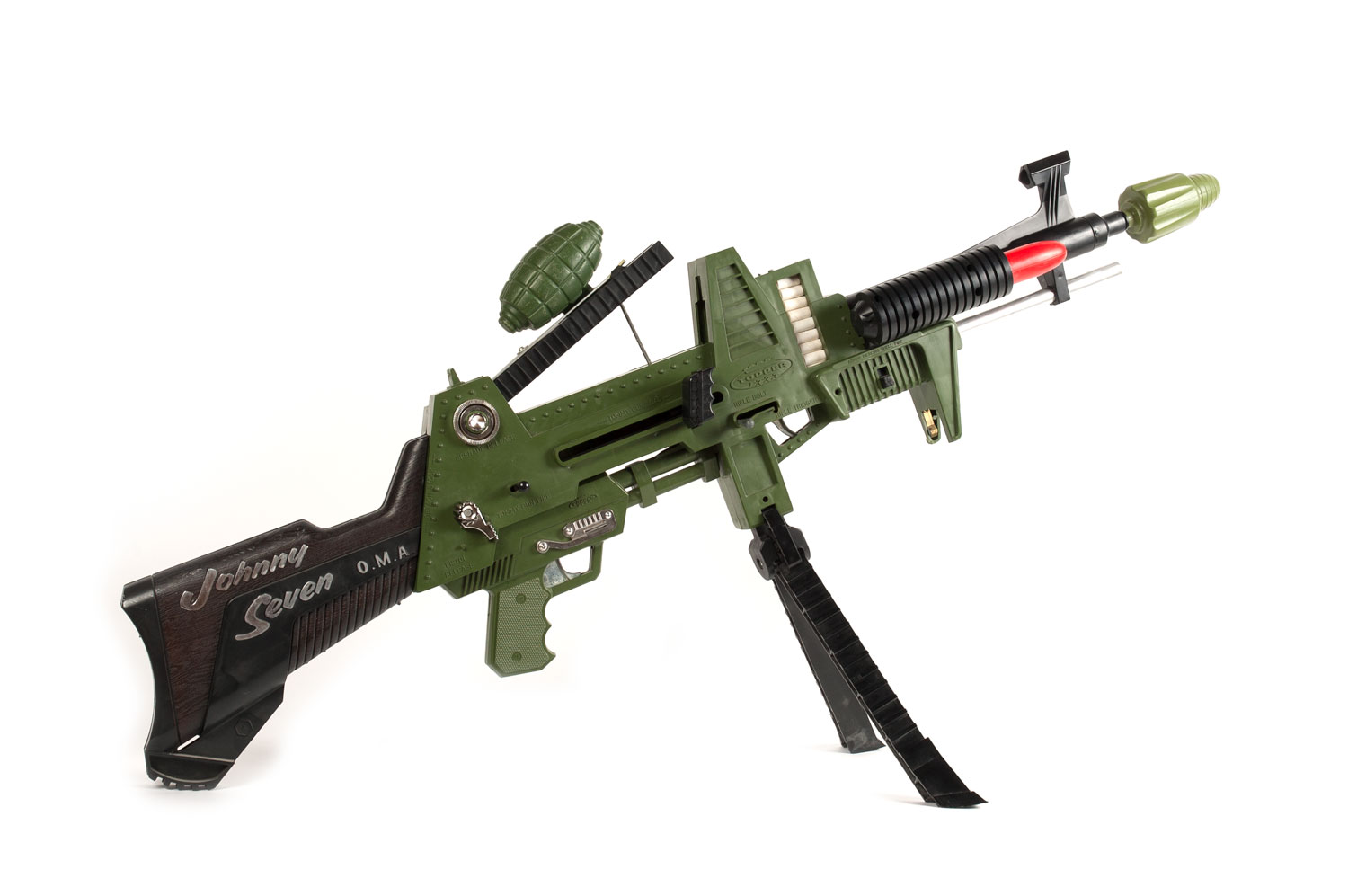
The Johnny Seven OMA, set up and ready for action, 2006

Perhaps the ultimate toy weapon was the 1964 Topper Toys Johnny Seven OMA (One Man Army) where an exciting television commercial showed one little boy using each of the seven weapons of the gun to wipe out a neighborhood full of children armed only with ordinary toy guns. Though an amazing seller, the Captain Kangaroo television program refused to air the advertisement. The proliferation of toy weapons was satirized in the "Our Man in Toyland" episode of Get Smart.

In the 1970s, the Star Wars media franchise provided new laser blaster and lightsabers produced by Kenner Toys.

== Toy gun control ==
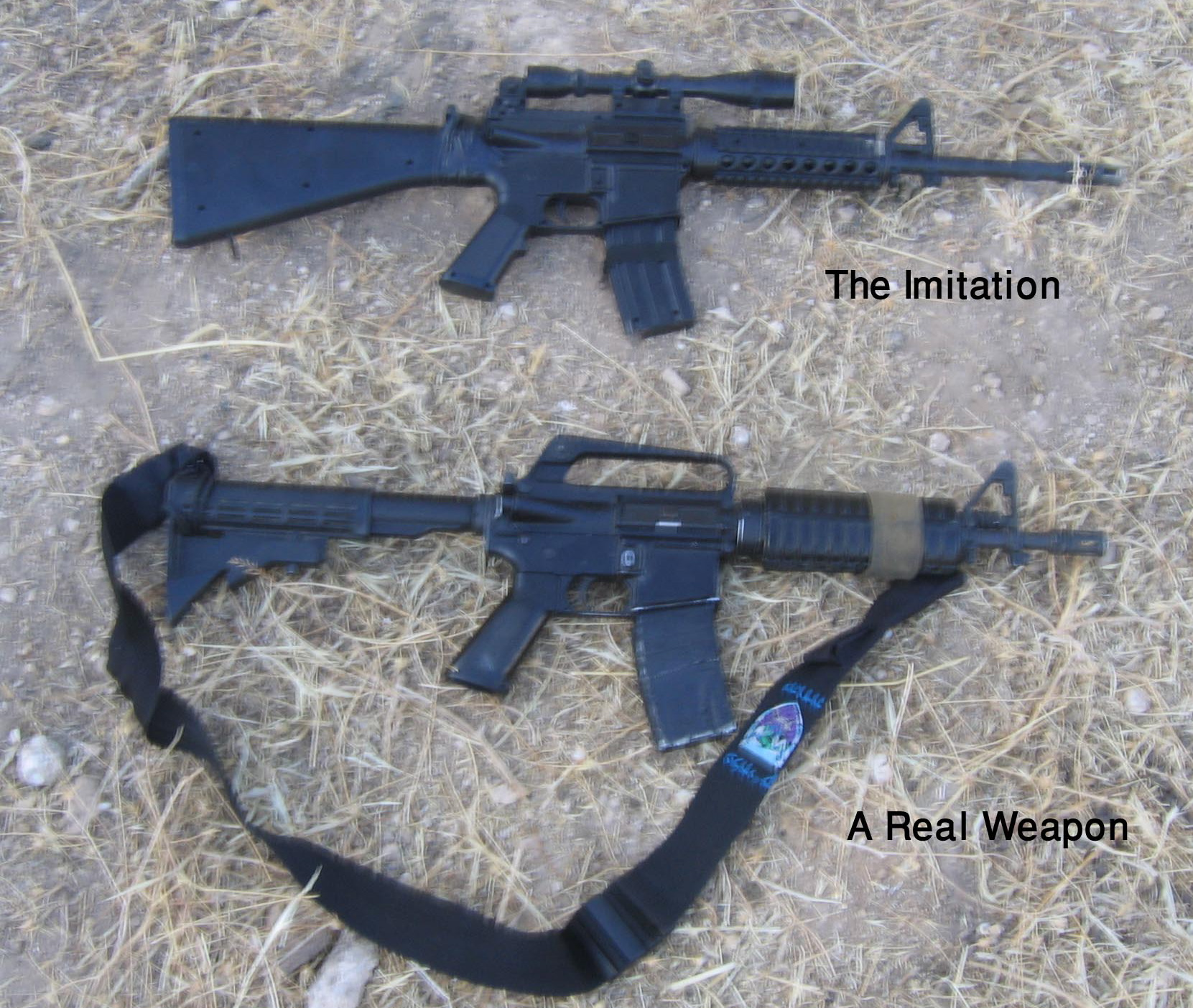
The imitation on top, real gun below, 2007

Toy guns can cause harm like many objects not under proper supervision. Unlike most other toys though, much of the danger of these toys is related to mistaking a toy gun for a real gun or vice versa. For example:

- a robber or other criminals might threaten people with a toy gun.
- people might call the police, flee, panic, or attempt to overpower someone carrying a toy gun.
- police officers and armed citizens might mistake someone carrying a toy gun for a killer carrying a real gun, and shoot them.
- a child might play with and fire a real gun confusing it for a toy gun.

=== United States ===
Toy guns were temporarily removed from the Sears Roebuck 1968 Christmas catalog after the April assassination of Martin Luther King Jr. and the June assassination of Robert F. Kennedy. However, they returned to the Sears catalog the following year.

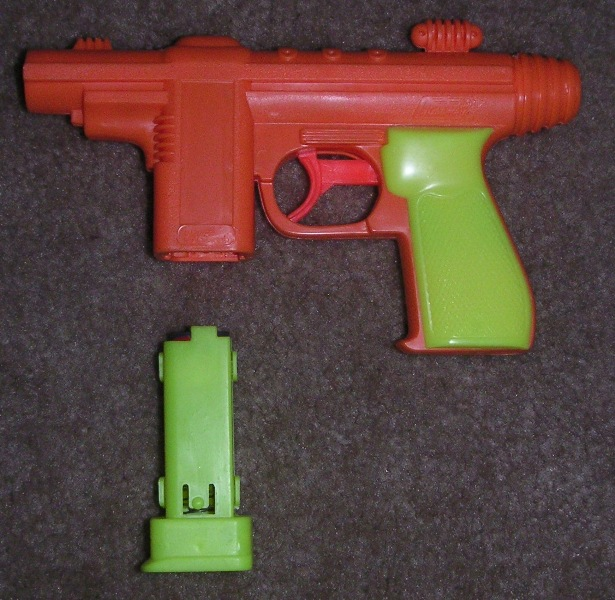
Brightly colored Jet Disc Tracer Gun, 2005

Beginning in the 1970s, American gun control advocates called for federal government to regulate and/or ban the manufacture and sale of toy guns. These calls were countered by toy industry groups, who preferred to set their own standards. In 1973, the newly formed U.S. Consumer Product Safety Commission received petitions and letters from consumers, asking the commission to institute mandatory safety standards for the design of toy weapons. These calls for action were repeated in 1975. However, the trade association representing the toy weapon manufacturers also contacted the CPSC, asking them to delay until the industry developed their own set of voluntary standards. The voluntary guidelines that were published over the next few years emphasized the use of warning labels on packaging and instructions, rather than mandating safety standards for the design of projectile toys. The Consumer Product Safety Commission rejected further petitions to regulate toy weapon manufacture in 1981 and 1985. In 1992, the Department of Commerce prohibited the manufacture, sale, or shipping of toy guns unless they have an orange tip or are entirely brightly colored. The regulation does not prohibit end-users from modifying the toys.

In March 2018, Walmart (the largest single retailer in the United States) announced that they would stop selling certain types of toy guns. “We are also removing items from our website resembling assault-style rifles, including nonlethal airsoft guns and toys,” the company said in a statement.

==== Laws ====
In the United States, federal law and regulations indicate that all toy guns transported or imported into the country must have a 6mm-wide blaze orange tip or a blaze orange stripe 1-inch (2.54 centimeters) thick on both sides of the barrel. However, this is not required by federal law for airsoft and paintball. Part 272 of Title 15 of the Code of Federal Regulations on foreign commerce and trade (15 CFR 272) states that "no person shall manufacture, enter into commerce, ship, transport, or receive any toy, look-alike, or imitation firearm" without approved markings; these may include an orange tip, orange barrel plug, brightly colored (safety orange) exterior of the whole toy, or transparent construction.

New York City, Washington, D.C., Chicago, and parts of Michigan have completely banned airsoft guns.. In New York City, as of 2003, the sale of replica toy guns was punishable with one year's jail term plus $1,000. Chicago goes even further with their mandates. It is considered a crime to wield a look-alike or replica gun (e.g., toy gun, airsoft gun) in public. If a toy gun or replica gun is used to commit a crime in Chicago, then that person is treated as though they had actually used a real firearm. However, state laws relating to the regulation of toy, look-alike, or imitation firearms, or purporting to ban the sale or manufacture of bb guns, paintball guns, or airsoft guns are preempted by federal law.

=== United Kingdom ===
There is a controversy as to whether or not toy guns are appropriate for children to play with. Some people believe they can encourage violence. In 2007, the British Department for Children, Schools and Families (which existed between 2007 and 2010) has advised young boys be encouraged to play with toy guns, as it will encourage them to learn and foster their development. However, the National Union of Teachers in England has criticised this advice, arguing that toy guns "symbolise aggression" and that encouraging boys to play with them fosters gender stereotypes.

=== Pakistan ===
In 2016, Shafeeq Gigyani, who is a peace activist in Pakistan, started a campaign against toy guns.

=== Brazil ===
On 3 October 2025, the Brazilian state of Rio de Janeiro prohibited the manufacture, sale, marketing, transportation and distribution of gel guns throughout the state. The measure was prompted by a series of incidents involving injuries caused by these weapons. The new legislation amends Law No. 2,403/95, which already prohibited toys and replicas of firearms that could be mistaken for real models.

== See also ==
- BB gun
- Ceremonial weapon
- Drill purpose rifle
- Lego gun
- Rubber band gun
- Rubber duck (military)
- Shooting of Tamir Rice
