= Popgun =

Toy gun which uses compressed air to fire a projectile

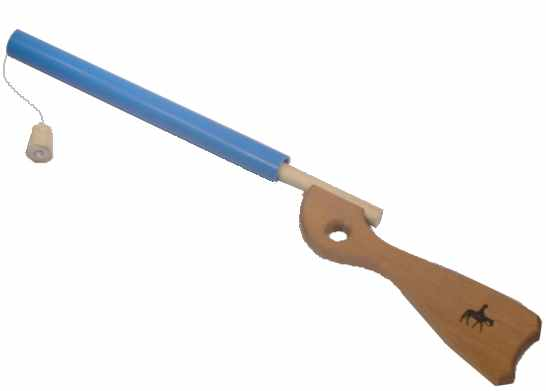
- A popgun
- Type: Toy weapon
- Availability: 17th century (documented)–present
- Materials: Wood, metal, plastic
- Features: Pneumatic (compressed air)

A popgun (also spelled pop gun or pop-gun) is a simple pneumatic toy weapon that uses compressed air (usually via piston action, though sometimes via spring pressure) to expel a lightweight projectile, typically a small tethered or untethered object, producing a distinctive popping sound. Popguns are among the earliest known mechanical toys based on air pressure and have been documented in Europe since at least the 17th century. Unlike pneumatic air rifles intended for target shooting, popguns are designed for low-velocity play, emphasising mechanical feedback and acoustics.

Although primarily associated with children's play, the popgun has also been used to demonstrate pneumatic principles, and appears in figurative language to describe something weak or ineffective.

== Etymology ==
The word popgun is a compound of pop, an imitative explosive sound, and gun. Its earliest English usage is recorded in the 1620s.

== Description ==
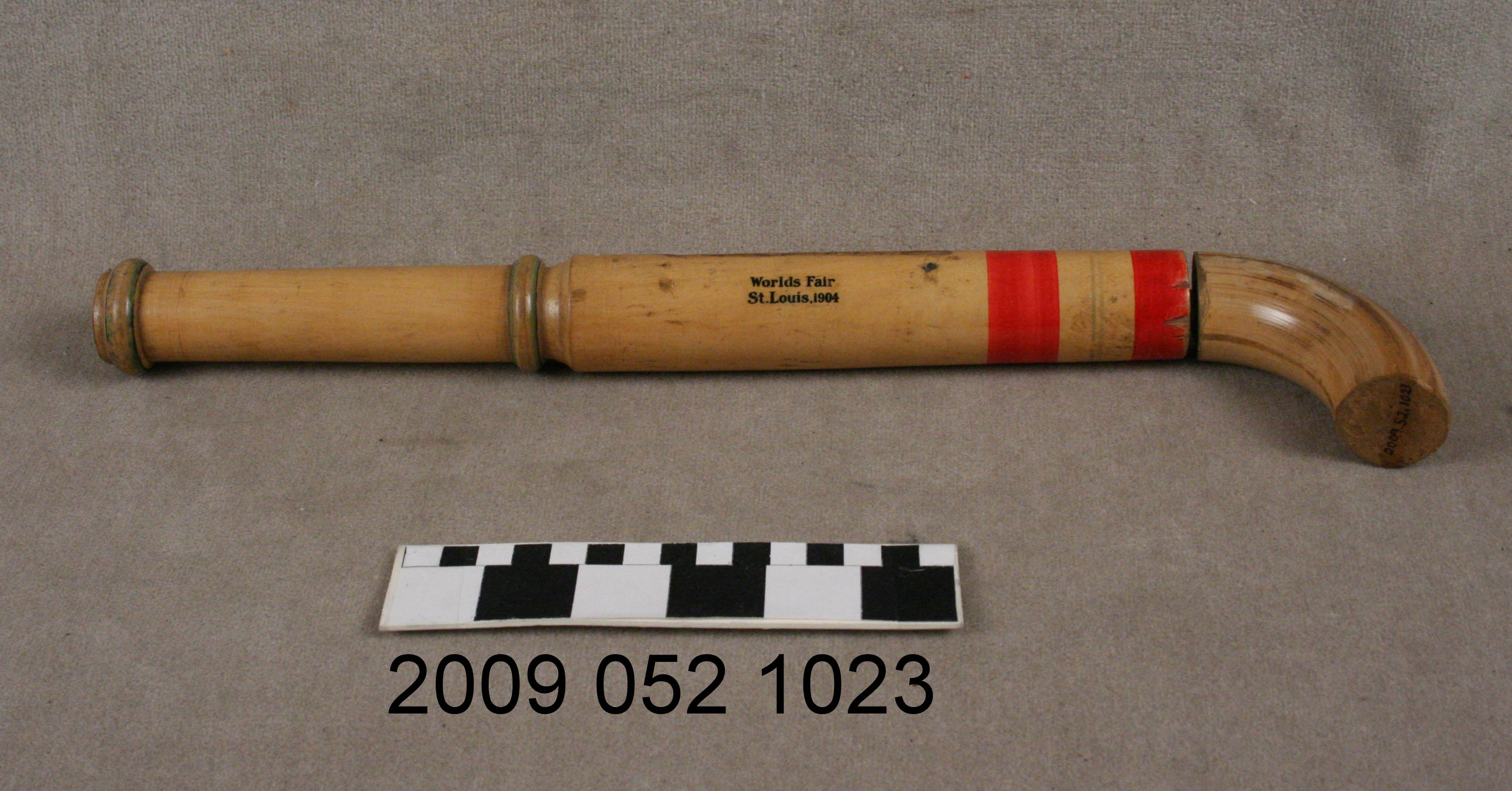
Wooden popgun from the 1904 World's Fair

A popgun typically consists of a tubular barrel and a closely fitting piston or plunger that compresses air behind a projectile. When actuated, the compressed air forces the projectile, commonly a cork, foam or paper wad, or soft rubber plug, out of the barrel with an audible "pop". Other variants do not launch the obstruction, but simply create a loud noise. This mechanism consists of a hollow cylindrical barrel which is sealed at one end with the projectile and at the other with a long-handled plunger.

=== Design ===
Popguns operate through basic pneumatic compression. A typical design includes:

- A cylindrical barrel
- A piston or plunger with an airtight seal
- One or more soft projectiles

When the plunger is pushed into the barrel, the air pressure behind the projectile increases until it is expelled. The sudden release of pressure produces the characteristic "popping" sound.

In some designs, two plugs are used in sequence, creating alternating compression and vacuum effects that amplify the sound.

=== Physics and mechanism ===
The fundamental operation of a popgun is that reducing the volume V of a gas increases its pressure P. For a popgun, since it is operated fast enough movement, adiabatic compression applies: part of the energy is turned into heat, so the increase in pressure is not as great as the reduction in volume. For air:

$P \propto \frac{1}{V^\frac{7}{5}}$	eg: a tenfold increase in pressure requires volume reduced to 1/25 of what it was.

where P is the pressure of the gas, V is the volume of the gas.

The process follows the mechanical sequence:

- Sealing: The projectile is firmly seated in the muzzle, creating an airtight seal.
- Compression: The user rapidly advances the plunger. This reduces the volume of the air trapped between the plunger head and the plug.
- Threshold: As the volume decreases, the internal pressure rises.
- Ejection: Once the force exceeds the static friction holding the plug in the barrel, the plug is launched. The rapid expansion of air and the subsequent vibration of the barrel walls produce the signature "pop".

== History ==
Popguns were historically constructed from natural materials such as hollow plant stems, especially elder (Sambucus nigra), and fitted with carved wooden plungers. Children commonly used berries, peas, or damp paper as ammunition. Such devices were widespread in rural Europe and North America and were often described in 18th- and 19th-century instructional literature for children.

Various types of popguns have been described, such as popguns made of a hollowed-out alder, willow, or elder branch in Texas and in Appalachia in the early 1900s, used to fire a wad of paper. Similarly an 1864 American children's book advises using a piece of elder with an iron rod as the piston, shooting pieces of "moistened tow". a similar anecdote from Alabama in the early 20th century used an elder tube, oak piston, and fired peas or chinaberries. Similar tube-and-plunger toys, firing small stones, were used by the Plains Indians and Native Americans of the Pacific Northwest, though these may post-date European contact. Similar toys were found in other American Indian cultures.

The popgun evolved from a primitive folk toy into a mass-produced consumer product. By the mid-19th century, popguns began to be manufactured commercially, often from turned wood with leather-sealed pistons. American companies like Upton & Co. and later Daisy Manufacturing began producing lithographed tin and steel popguns. These often featured "break-action" loading mechanisms similar to real shotguns to appeal to the "Wild West" cultural trends of the time.

In the 20th century, metal and plastic versions became common as industrial toy production expanded. During the Second World War, shortages of metal led to increased production of wooden toys, including popguns, as substitutes for more complex items.

== Derivatives ==
=== Spud gun ===
A popular variation of the popgun is the "spud gun" or "potato gun". Rather than a permanent cork, the user pushes the muzzle into a raw potato, carving out a small plug that serves as the projectile.

=== Vacuum popgun ===
Some modern designs use a "reverse" action. Instead of compressing air to push a plug out, the plunger creates a partial vacuum that, when released, causes the plug to snap back against the barrel, creating the noise through impact and rapid air displacement rather than projectile flight.

== Cultural significance ==
Popguns are frequently associated with childhood play and ingenuity and appear in memoirs and folklore as symbols of informal entertainment, for example, "while on the desk before him might be seen sundry contraband articles and prohibited weapons, detected upon the persons of idle urchins, such as half-munched apples, popguns, whirligigs, fly-cages, and whole legions of rampant little paper game-cocks" (The Legend of Sleepy Hollow, 1820, Washington Irving).

The term has also entered figurative usage. In political, military, and sporting contexts, "popgun" describes something that appears threatening but lacks real power, for example, "Then, to my horror, he coolly stooped, placing candle and chair on the leads, and his hands in his pockets, as though it were but a popgun that covered him" (To Catch a Thief, 1901, E. W. Hornung).

A notable historical reference is the Popgun Plot, an alleged conspiracy to assassinate King George III, using an air-gun rather than a popgun.

== Safety standards ==
Popguns are strictly regulated to prevent ocular or other injuries. Under European Standard EN 71 safety standard for toys, they must limit projectile energy, avoid hazardous projectiles, and pass impact testing. Under USA ASTM F963 safety standards, they must use soft, lightweight projectiles, meet kinetic energy limits, and avoid sharp points or rigid materials.

== See also ==
- Air gun
- Gun, a weapon that shoots bullets at high-speed.
- Pneumatics
- Popgun Plot, an alleged 1794 conspiracy to assassinate George III using a poisoned dart fired by an airgun
- Spud gun
- Toy weapon
