= Johnny Seven OMA =

1964 toy gun

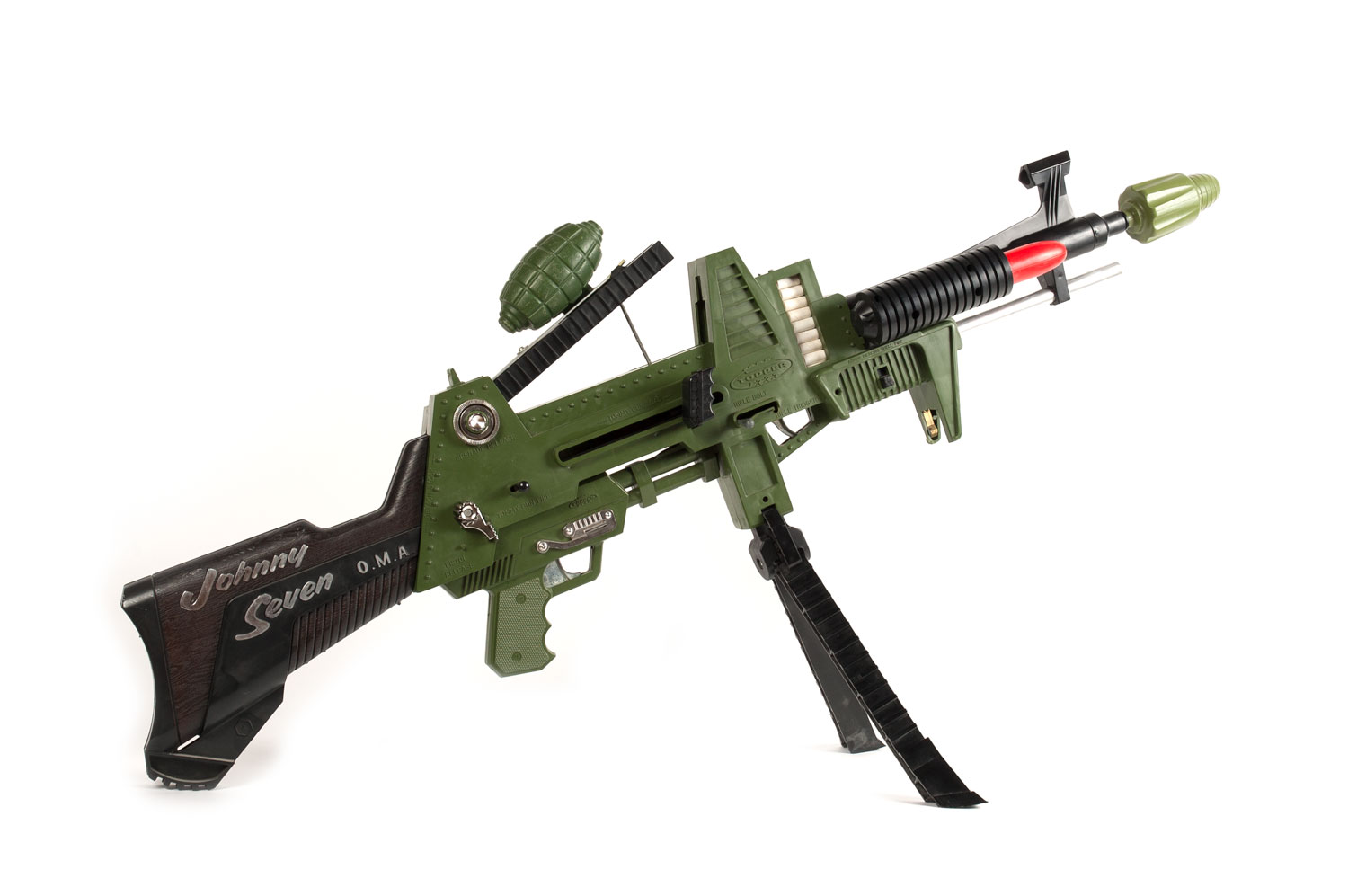
Johnny Seven OMA

Johnny Seven O.M.A. (One Man Army) is a multi-function toy weapon produced by Deluxe Reading under their Topper Toys toyline and released in 1964. Johnny Seven O.M.A. was the best selling boys' toy of 1964, and was marketed on children's television. It has a unique number of features, including seven actions (thus the "Seven" in the name). The toy is no longer made, and has become a collector's item.

== Functions ==
All of the firing mechanisms are attached to the main rifle assembly, the pistol inserts from the bottom to provide the rifle grip (the pistol also holds caps for authentic firing sounds). The "Rifle" function shot twelve white bullets one at a time via a bolt action spring mechanism through the silver barrel. Three different "rockets" fired via spring action on the main barrel. The Grenade Launcher was on top of the gun.

Johnny Seven also featured a bipod that provided stability for the various rockets and grenade. The stock could be removed to shorten the weapon while in the "Machine Gun" mode. The toy when fully assembled was over three feet long, and weighed about four pounds.

=== Grenade launcher ===
A grenade launcher is located on top of the main body, above the pistol grip. The launcher extends upwards, and the spring loaded grenade is launched by depressing a button on the side of the rifle.

=== Anti-tank rocket ===
The red "Armor Piercing" missile is fired from a launcher located on the right of the body of the gun. The firing button is placed underneath the launcher.

=== Armor-piercing shell/anti-bunker missile ===
The two large green shells were fired from the front of the rifle directly above the Rifle barrel. The firing button is on the left side of the rifle.

=== Repeating rifle ===
Twelve white bullets are fired from a fixed magazine on the rifle. The bullets are fed into the chamber by a spring-loaded bolt, one at a time.

=== Machine gun ===
Pull the lever back towards the stock, press the release button and you get a "rat-a-tat" machine gun noise.

=== Automatic pistol ===
The cap firing pistol could be removed from the gun.

== Accessories ==
To replace lost components, Topper also marketed an additional spare ammunition pack that comprised a complete set of four grenade/missiles and twelve bullets. Additional toy accessories were marketed under the "Johnny Seven" banner including a helmet and walkie-talkies. Deluxe Reading used the Topper Toys brand to add a modern flair to their new product lines.

Deluxe Reading was famous for creating huge package playsets that could be seen by children when viewing the top, unusable shelf in grocery store chains. By creating large, colorful boxes, the space could be used to market to the children that always accompanied parents while food shopping, an unusual marketing "trick" that worked well for Deluxe Reading and later copycat toy companies, such as Remco.

The "Johnny Seven" box came in two variations, one a standard box showing a boy looking through the sights of the gun, and the second (rare now for collectors) showed a "battle field" scenario behind the mounted gun with a see through plastic lid. The Johnny Seven gun was manufactured in four countries, and in order of rarity for collectors purposes, they were Australia, the United Kingdom, Canada (in a dual-language box) and the American version.

== Deluxe Reading ==
Deluxe Reading produced many memorable toys including the Johnny Lightning cars (similar to Mattel's Hot Wheels), the Crime Buster Gun (similar to the O.M.A, only geared towards kids play-acting cops and robbers), the Operation X 500 Space Base and others.

Toy weapons technology continued at a rapid pace, with the next year bringing a Multi Pistol 09, a James Bond type pistol in carrying case with nine different functions.

== In popular culture ==
- On his show Captain Kangaroo, Bob Keeshan refused to allow adverts for Johnny Seven OMA to be shown.
- The toy was mentioned by Myron Larabee (played by Sinbad) in the holiday comedy film Jingle All the Way (1996). It was mentioned again, as the Turbo Man was the most popular toy since the O.M.A.
- Featured on Law and Order: Criminal Intent. Detective Robert Goren finds one in a toy store, and demonstrates all seven firing modes (Episode: Law & Order: Criminal Intent: Collective) June 2006.
- In an episode of the British comic strip Alex, the title character had owned a Johnny Seven as a child, which had allowed him to live out one of his dearest fantasies, as shown in flashback: boasting to his friends that he had bought it with his own money.
- The toy was mentioned on Heart Like a Wheel, by British electro pop group The Human League.
- Lyrics of the song "What's With Terry", by Derry punk rock group The Undertones, include, "Then came the day Terry always did dread Christmas had come a present lay on his bed/A Johnny Seven or a cuddly toy?."
- In the British sitcom Men Behaving Badly (1992), Series 1, Episode 6 ("My Brilliant Career"), Dermot (played by Harry Enfield) picks up a Johnny 7, saying "I've always wanted a Johnny 7, let's play war!"
- An episode of The Smell of Reeves and Mortimer features an interview with "Lovejoy" (Bob Mortimer) portrayed as a Native American, describing a ritual hunt on which he carried a Johnny Seven as weaponry.
- British rock band Twenty Flight Rockers' second single was entitled Johnny 7 although the lyrics of the song make no reference to the toy itself.
- Irish punk band Stiff Little Fingers album of 1991, Flags and Emblems, contains a track named Johnny 7. This song refers to childhood and the security felt with the subjects Johnny 7 toy.
- Achmed the Dead Terrorist brandishes the gun in a short by Jeff Dunham from 2016, while he and the other dummies say that they aren't afraid to make jokes about Hillary Clinton. Dunham later did an unboxing video for the gun.
- Roman Kemp mentioned on I'm a Celebrity...Get Me Out of Here! that he purchased one for his father Martin Kemp for Christmas after spotting one for sale on eBay. The gift moved his father to tears because, as a child, his parents could not afford to buy one for him.
- The toy makes a fleeting appearance in Jean-Luc Godard's 1967 film La Chinoise held by a character in a tiger mask.
- In the virtual world of Gun Gale Online volume 10, Pitohui comes across a fully-functional Johnny Seven and is elated, stating that she always wanted one as a kid. Llenn tries using it but remarks that it's impossible to use the sights because the grenade is in the way.
- Irish comedian Brendan O'Carroll owned one as a kid as a result of nicking it from a crate after a fire at a warehouse.
