= Dawn doll =

Fashion doll by Topper

Dawn dolls are small fashion dolls that were made by Topper Toys between 1970 and 1973. They measure 6.5 inches in height and have painted eyes and lips. The girl dolls feature rooted hair and eyelashes. The boy dolls have molded hair.

The dolls were quite popular and they topped sales of Barbie for a while, but were discontinued when Topper went out of business in 1973. The dolls were reissued in 2000 by Checkerboard as a 30-year commemoration of the first Dawn dolls made by Topper, and then again in 2004 by Toy O Rama. However, neither company was able to sustain reissues and shut off production shortly afterwards. Mattel's Rockflowers, produced in 1971, were in direct competition with Dawn. In England, Palitoy had a doll of similar size known as Pippa. Although no longer manufactured, Dawn dolls are quite popular as collector's items.

== Story ==
Dawn is the owner and top model of the Dawn Model Agency. All of her best friends are models for her company too. Angie, Jessica, Dale, Glori, and Longlocks are all Dawn's best friends. Gary, Ron, and Van are the handsome boyfriends who come see the girls in their fashion shows.

== Characteristics ==
The basic Dawn dolls were made of vinyl with hard torsos, softer arms, and bendable legs. The dolls' feet feature holes in the bottoms, which could be inserted onto pegs on their plastic doll stands, and other various accessories. However, Topper did not use exactly the same body mold for each doll, because a number of variations can be observed from doll to doll. Some dolls are slightly heavier in build with thicker thighs. Others have visible collar bones, navels, The dolls' hands vary slightly in size and detail. In addition, some dolls seem to have more rows of hair plugs than others. These dolls tend to have a coarser hair texture than ones with less hair.

Dawn dolls knees are known to take on a greenish tinge over time due to the copper inside their joints. The copper wire inside the knees is what allows the joints to "click" into place and hold various positions. The dolls with the green knee problems tend to be the ones with the slightly heavier builds.

Authentic Dawn dolls are marked ©1970 // TOPPER CORP // HONG KONG// have a stamped model number on the back of their heads. This number is usually a letter followed by two numbers (Ex. F45).

== History ==
The first set of Dawn dolls were released by Topper Toys in 1970. They included Dawn, Angie, Glori, and Dale. The second set of Dawn dolls added Jessica, Longlocks, Gary, Ron, and Van to the bunch. This second set also introduced the "Head to Toe", "Dancing", and "Flower Fantasy" themes. The first set of dolls was also released under these themes. The last wave of dolls came out under the "Model Agency" and "Majorette" themes. The “Model Agency” theme introduced new dolls, Dinah, Denise, Melanie, Daphne, and Maureen. The "Majorette" theme brought in Connie, April, and Kip. The Dawn dolls provided a good amount of competition for the more expensive Mattel Barbie doll. Due to the lower price of Dawn dolls, it was easy for consumers to amass a relatively large portion of the collection for little money.

However, Topper Toys went bankrupt in 1973 and Dawn dolls were discontinued. Although the dolls achieved a huge amount of initial success, it was difficult to maintain. The small size of the doll made it hard for the manufacturers to get enough detailing onto the clothing to substantially innovate the styles.

After Topper shut down in the spring of 1973, dolls were packaged to be sold from the scraps of the leftover inventory. Thus, a doll might be packaged in outfits and/or boxes made for another doll character. For example, a Dale doll might come in Angie's "Model Agency" outfit in a box printed with Longlocks' name. Dolls were also manufactured from leftover parts, so a buyer might get Dawn with Jessica's hair.

Checkerboard Toys then took over the Dawn doll market and began making reproductions of Dawn, Glori, Angie, and Dale as a 30th anniversary commemoration to the first Topper Dawn dolls. Checkerboard also released four new dolls, Shannon, Macy, Maura, and Denise. However, the new dolls never really caught on and Checkerboard made its last Dawn dolls in 2003. In 2004, Toy O Rama rereleased a line of Dawn dolls, but met with little success and shortly discontinued manufacturing.

Theme	Description
"Head To Toe"	Short hair with three interchangeable wigs
"Dancing"	Legs move when you move the arms
"Flower Fantasies"	Doll comes standing among plastic flowers in flower pot
"Majorette"	In marching band uniform with glow in the dark baton
"Model Agencies"	More elaborate and formal outfits with a wide range of names such as "Buttercups 'n' Moonbeams, Dance 'Till Dawn, Gold Go Round, Silvery Pompoms, etc"

== Accessories ==
Dawn and her friends enjoyed a wide range of cool accessories. The Dawn Fashion Show was a revolving stage where the girls could practice modeling the latest fashions. The Dawn Beauty Pageant was a similar item that allowed the dolls to walk the runway, turn, and walk back along the other side. The Dawn's Disco was a psychedelic revolving dance floor where exclusive doll characters, Fancy Feet and her dreamy boyfriend Kevin, could dance the night away. Dawn's Beauty Parlor and Dawn's Dress shop let the girls try out the latest looks in the three-way mirror and actual working sink. They could drive there in Dawn's Action Car, a flashy blue convertible.
