= Silly Bandz =

Shaped rubber bands

- Founded: 2008; 18 years ago
- Products: Silicone bracelets

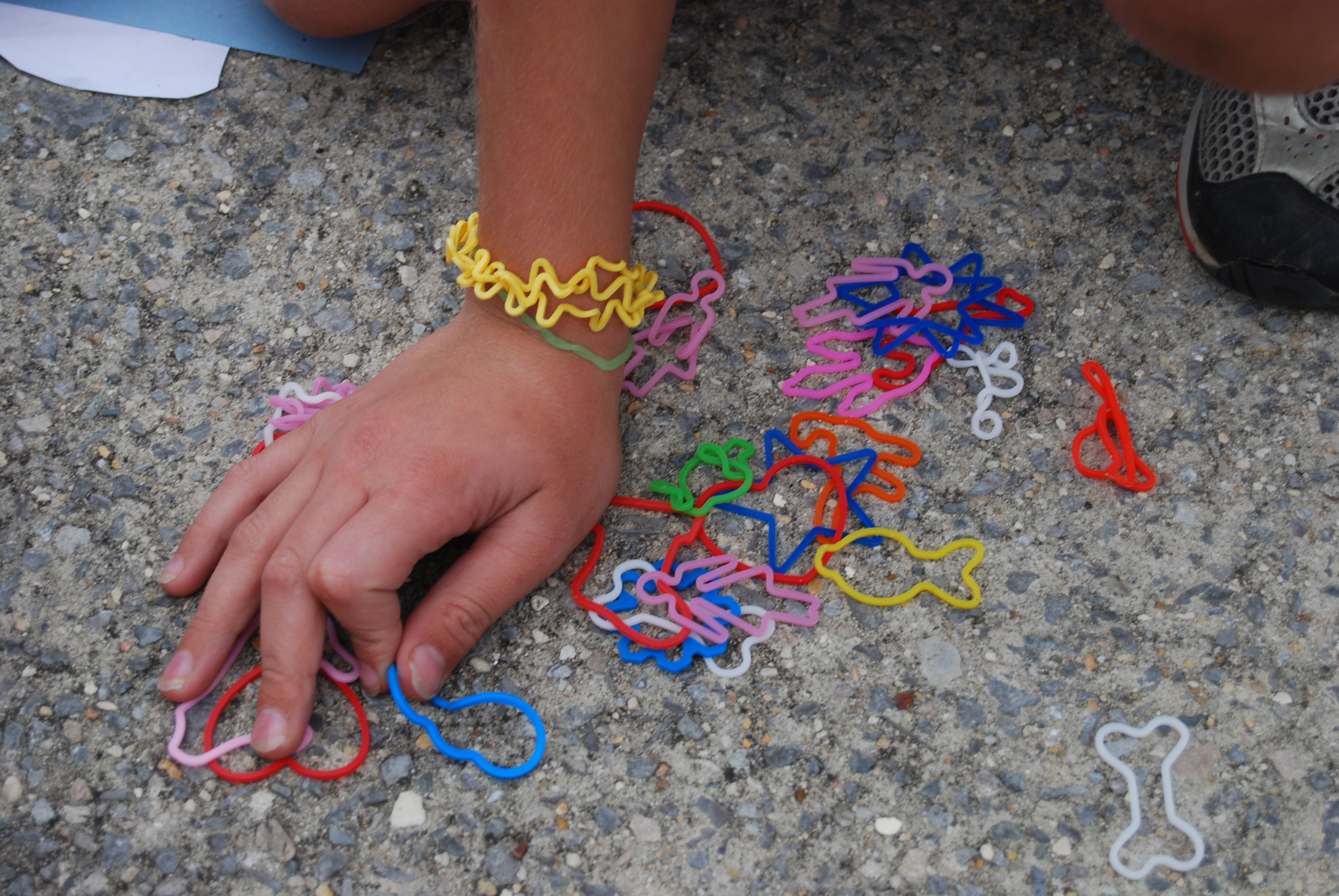
Child playing with Silly Bandz wristbands

Silly Bandz are rubber bands made of silicone rubber formed into shapes including animals, objects, numbers, and letters. They are normally worn as bracelets. Silly Bandz retail in packages with select themes, such as princesses or animals, and fashion accessories. Similarly shaped silicone bands are also available under other brand names from a variety of companies. Silly Bandz were especially popular in the early 2010s.

== Origin and concept ==
Silly Bandz come in a variety of shapes and colors. On a wrist, they function like a regular bracelet, and when taken off they revert to their original shape. They are often worn many at a time and are traded like other collectibles. They can also be used for their original intent—as a regular rubber band.

The original shaped silicone rubber bands were created in 2002 by the Japanese design team Passkey Design, Yumiko Ohashi, and Masonar Haneda. They made the bands in cute animal shapes to encourage sustainability by discouraging people from treating the rubber bands as disposable. Sold under the brand name Animal Rubber Bands, they won the Best Design award at the 2003 Japanese National Competition. These bands were not widely distributed in the United States, but in 2005 they were local hits in Guilford, Connecticut and at the Design Store at the New York City Museum of Modern Art.

Robert Croak, owner of Toledo, Ohio-based BCP Imports (known for distributing the Livestrong wristbands), encountered the bands on a business trip and decided to re-purpose them as a toy by making them larger and thicker, and marketing them as a kids' fashion accessory.

== Distribution and reception ==
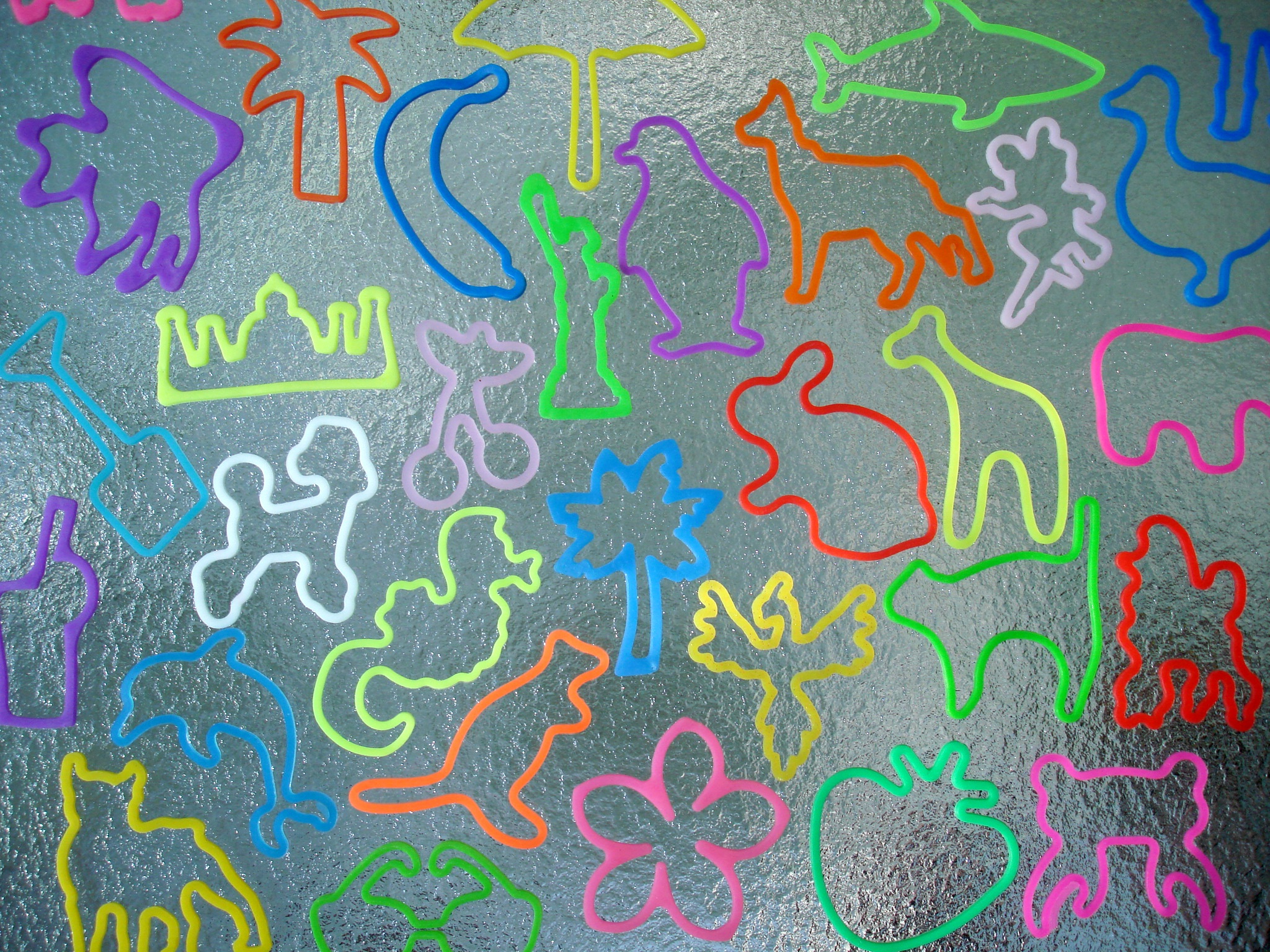
Several different brands of Silly Bandz type shaped silicone bands

The first Silly Bandz sets were sold online in November 2008. In early 2009, Learning Express in Birmingham, Alabama became the first retail store to stock Silly Bandz. By fall they were a strong seller, and became widespread across the Southern United States. Popularity began to move up the East coast of the United States, reaching New Jersey, Long Island, and Staten Island in November the same year.

Silly Bandz are sold in packages with different themes, including princesses and animals. In August 2010, Silly Bandz sold their product in thousands of stores across the U.S. and Canada. In September 2010, Quiznos had Silly Bandz in their kids meal. Seven spots on Amazon's April 22 list of best-selling toys and games were occupied by the bracelets. By December, Sillybandz controlled the top 25 list of toys for Amazon.com One December 2010 article said that brands like Logo Bandz, Cool Bandz, Zany Bandz and Googly Bandz were easier to find than Silly Bandz. In late 2010 and 2011, Silly Bandz released themed packs in collaboration with celebrities like Justin Bieber and Kim Kardashian. In late 2011, Zoo Games released video games based on Silly Bandz for Nintendo DS and iPhone. There was also a feature of glow in the dark Silly Bandz that hit stores in October of 2010. In spring and summer 2011 Winter's brand chocolates of Peru included Silly Bandz, marketed in South America as Animaligas, in displays and packages of Chin Chin chocolates.

Seth McGowan, a toy industry analyst for Needham & Company, said it is refreshing that the "lowest of technologies" is also the one that is the most appealing, to children. One parent attributed the toy's success to their being easily lost and broken, and said that "If your friend has the princess kind, then you have to have the princess kind, too." Silly Bandz were banned in many classrooms for being too distracting, with students trading them with each other during class. There have been incidents where children have cut off circulation by extending several Silly Bandz up their arms, in some cases causing serious injuries.

== See also ==
- Friendship bracelet
- Gel bracelet
- Rainbow Loom
- Wonder Loom
