= Rainbow Loom =

Craft toy used to make bracelets

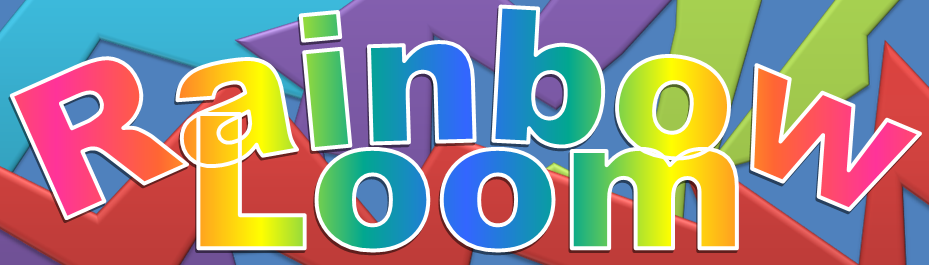
Rainbow Loom logo

Rainbow Loom is a plastic tool used to weave colorful rubber and plastic bands (called loom bands) into decorative items such as bracelets and charms. It was invented in 2010 by Cheong Choon Ng in Novi, Michigan. As of September 2014, Ng's company had sold over 8 million units worldwide, along with 40 million packets of rubber bands.

== Description ==
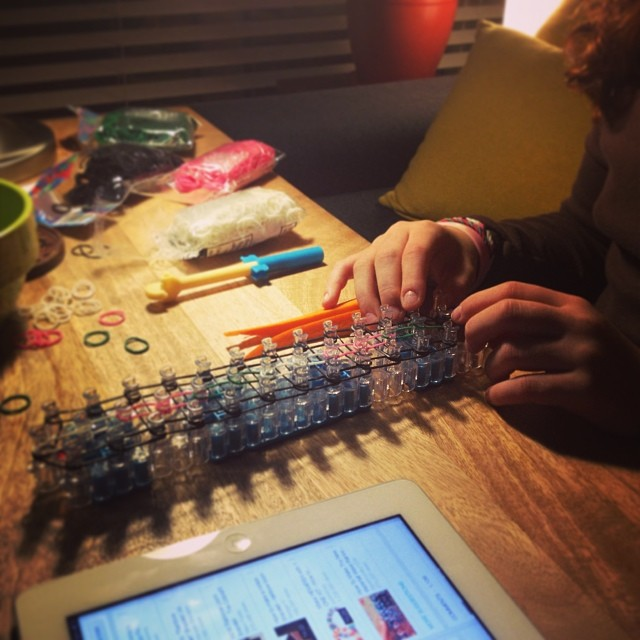
A Rainbow Loom in use

The Rainbow Loom is a plastic pegboard measuring 2 inches (51 mm) by 8 inches (200 mm). It has push pin-type pegs over which small, colored rubber bands are looped and pulled by a rainbow loom crochet hook. The resulting looped knots, known as Brunnian links, can be assembled on the loom into bracelets and other shapes. The Rainbow Loom kit includes the loom (the pegboard), a rainbow loom hook, 25 special C-shaped clips to connect both ends of the bracelet, and 600+ small rubber bands in assorted colors.

== History ==
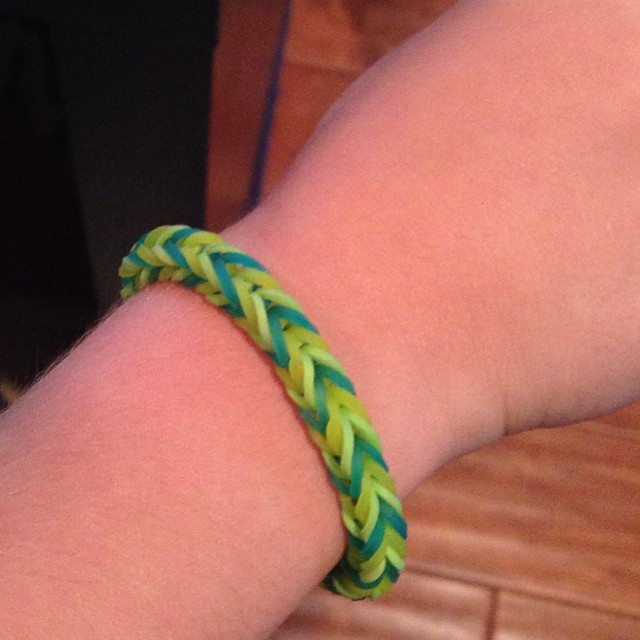
A fishtail bracelet made from loom bands

Rainbow Loom was created by Cheong Choon Ng, a Malaysian immigrant of Chinese descent who came to the United States in 1991 to attend Wichita State University, where he earned a graduate degree in mechanical engineering. He was employed as a crash-test engineer for Nissan Motor Company in 2010. He conceived the idea of a toy loom for rubber-band crafting after seeing his young daughters make rubber-band bracelets. He tried to show them how they could link the rubber bands together but was unsuccessful because of the large size of his fingers, so he stuck a scrap board with multiple rows of pegs on which the bands could be linked more easily.

The bracelets became popular with the neighborhood children, and his daughter suggested that he sell them. He spent six months developing the loom kit and designed 28 versions. His prototype, which he called Twistz Bandz, used a wooden board, pegs, and dental hooks. He invested $10,000 and found a factory in China to manufacture the parts, which he and his wife assembled in their home in June 2011. Ng decided to rename his product after discovering that an elastic hair band on the market was named Twist Band, and his brother and niece came up with the name Rainbow Loom.

Efforts to sell the loom online and in toy stores, however, were unsuccessful because customers did not understand how to use the product. Ng started a website and filmed instructional videos featuring his daughters and niece. In summer 2012, Ng received his first store orders from franchises of Learning Express Toys, a specialty crafts chain, and sales picked up. In June 2013 arts and crafts retail chain Michaels test-marketed the product in 32 stores; by August the chain was carrying Rainbow Loom in its 1,100 U.S. locations. Rainbow Loom is also sold at Mastermind Toys in Canada and specialty stores. As of August 2013, 600 retailers were selling Rainbow Loom at a retail price of $15 to $17. The kits are manufactured in China, and Ng supervises distribution out of a 7,500 square feet (700 m^{2}) warehouse near his home.

In 2013, Ng worked with The Beadery and Toner Plastics to produce the Wonder Loom, a redesigned version of the Rainbow Loom that is made in the United States. The Wonder Loom is sold by Walmart. In April 2014, Ng released a travel-sized version of the Rainbow Loom called the Monster Tail, which allows simple bracelets to be made on only eight pegs, arranged in a rectangle.

In mid-May 2015, Rainbow Loom released two new products:

The Alpha Loom, another travel-sized loom that can be used to make vibrantly colored name bracelets with special types of new bands, which are twice as thick but half the size of regular bands. It has seven pegs on either side, and it comes with a special hook that has seven hooks on so users can hook over seven bands at once, instead of one. It also comes with an instruction manual with pixelated grids for users to photocopy, cut out, measure around the wrist, and design the patterns themselves, with pictures and letters to spell words.

The Hair Loom Studio, also released in May 2015, is used to make designs on the Rainbow Loom, Finger Loom, or Monster Tail, which can then be transferred onto the user's hair by pushing the design off a "guide tube" onto a long strand of hair. The bands for this are made of silicone and can be removed without pulling at the hair. There are two versions of the Hair Loom Studio, a large "double" and a small "single" loom.

== Reception ==
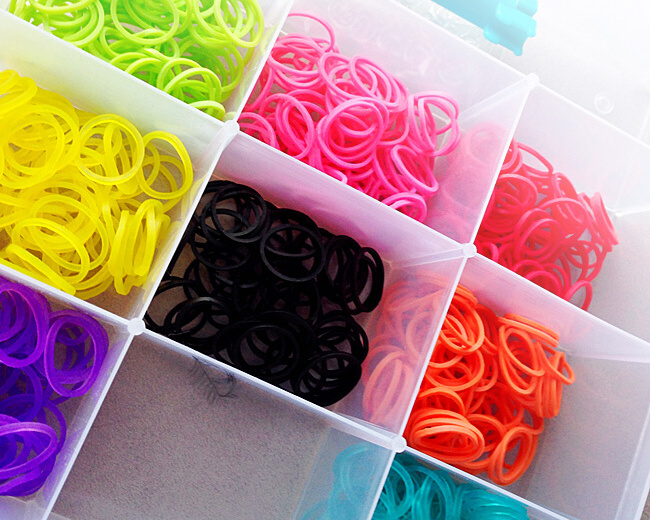
Multicolored rubber bands, used to create items with the Rainbow Loom

Targeted at children aged 8 to 14, Rainbow Loom became a popular pastime in summer camps and summer clubs in 2013, according to The New York Times and Today. Grade school-age children make and swap their rubber-band bracelets in the same way as friendship bracelets, and children have posted thousands of their own instructional videos online. As of October 2013, Rainbow Loom's YouTube channel featured 66 how-to videos and had received nearly 4 million views. In November 2013 third-graders at St. John the Worker school in Orefield, Pennsylvania participated in a "Rainbow Loom-a-thon", weaving rubber-band bracelets for cancer patients.

Rainbow Loom was named one of the three most popular toys of 2013 by Cyber Monday Awards and was the most-searched toy on Google that same year. It was described in a 2014 BBC News article as "one of the most popular toys in the world".

Among the celebrities seen wearing Rainbow Loom bracelets given to them by fans are Prince William, Duke of Cambridge, Catherine, Duchess of Cambridge, David Beckham, Harry Styles, Miley Cyrus, and Pope Francis.

=== In schools ===
In October 2013 two New York City schools banned Rainbow Loom bracelets, stating they were distracting students in the classroom and breeding animosity in the playground. Two Orlando, Florida schools have also enforced strict rules on wearing and trading Rainbow Loom bracelets. A Wallingford, Connecticut school had also banned the creation and exchange of Rainbow loom band bracelets, due to the rise of arguments that arose from band exchanges.

== Imitations ==
Choon Ng applied to the United States Patent and Trademark Office in 2010 for a patent on Rainbow Loom. He then received US Patent No. 8,485,565 for "Brunnian link making device and kit" on July 16, 2013. Ng received a second US Patent, No. 8,684,420 on April 1, 2014.

In August 2013 Ng filed suit against Zenacon LLC, makers of FunLoom; LaRose Industries LLC, makers of Cra-Z-Loom; and Toys "R" Us, distributors of Cra-Z-Loom, alleging that the rival products copied the design of the C-shaped fasteners used in rubber-band jewelry-making on the Rainbow Loom. LaRose Industries immediately lodged a countersuit against Ng's company, Choon's Design LLC. In August 2014, LaRose challenged Choon's patent and filed the first-ever post-grant review proceeding brought under the America Invents Act. The review ended in January 2015 after a settlement.

In some of the knock-off versions, high levels of the carcinogenic substance phthalate have been found, in some cases well above the allowed limit in children's toys in Europe. British investigators found phthalate levels over 400 times the legal limit, and several toy stores have removed these products.

The Norwegian Environment Agency also found higher than legal levels of DEHP, and several products have been banned from the market. However, it has been confirmed that it was only some non-Rainbow Loom-brand charms, and not bands.

== Gallery ==
Items created with Rainbow Loom

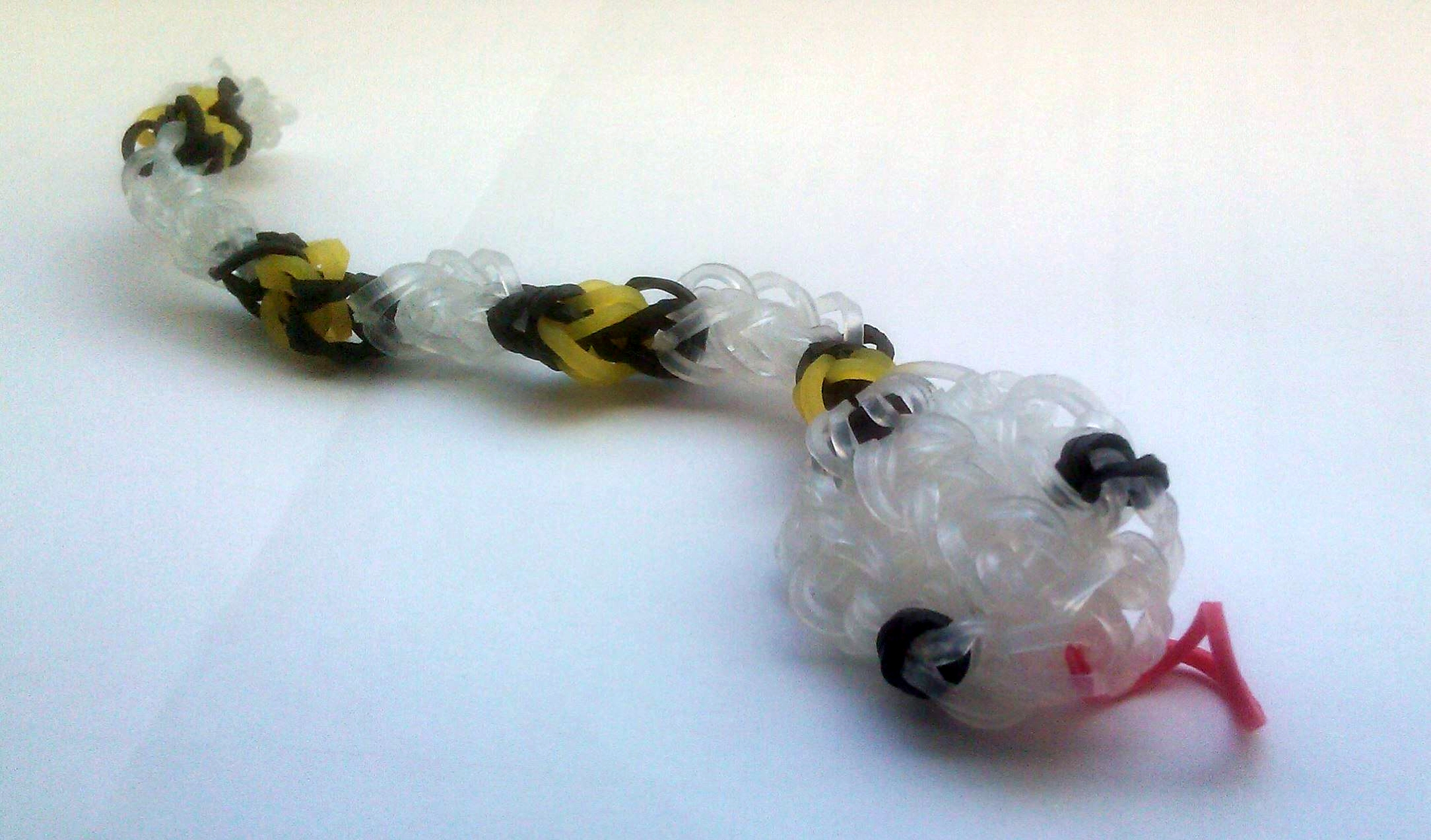
Snake

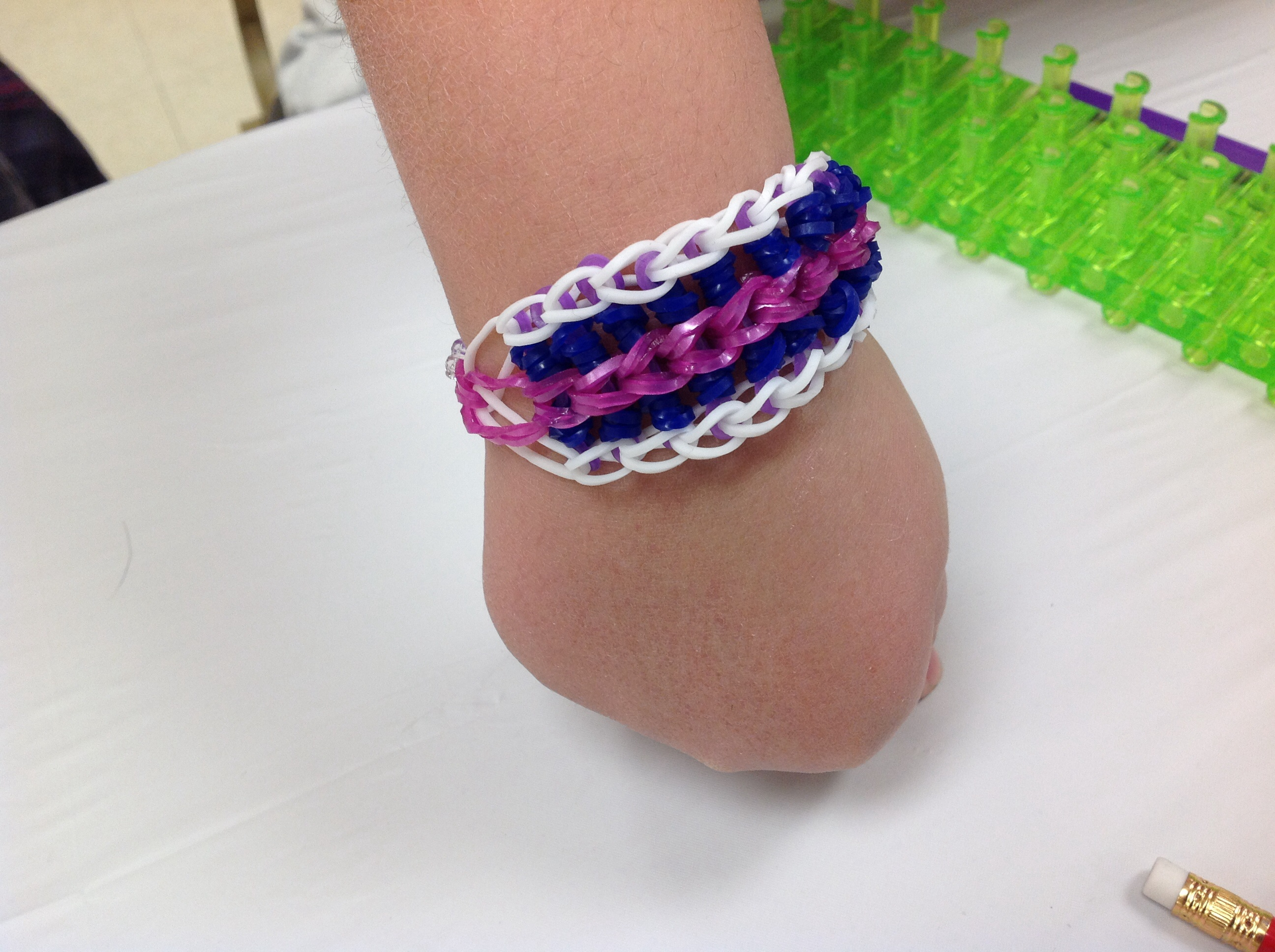
Multi-row bracelet

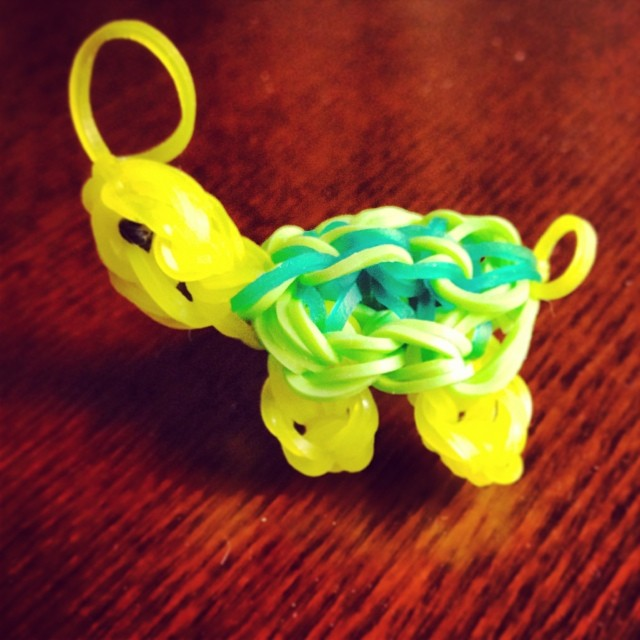
Turtle

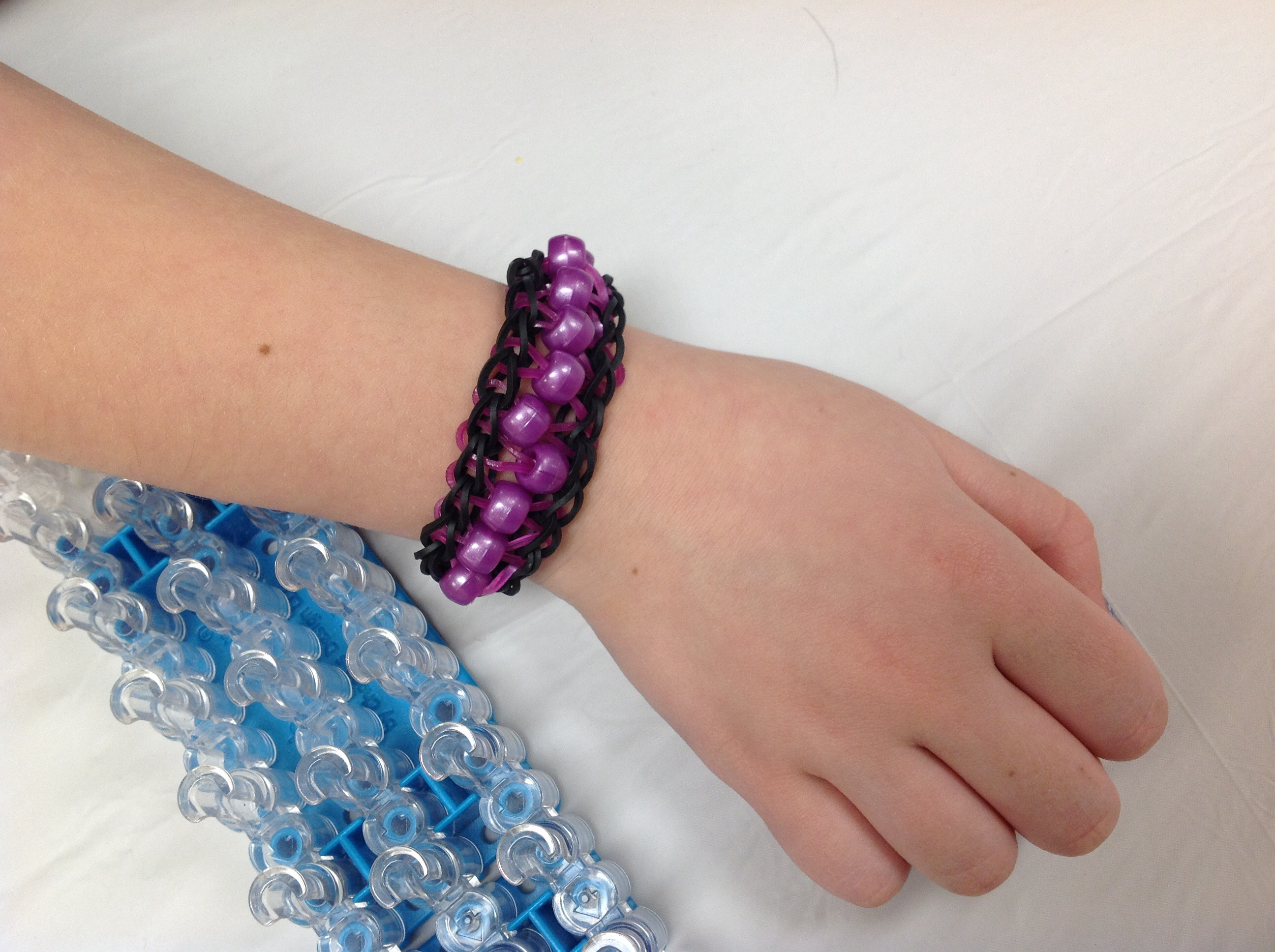
RBL bracelet with beads

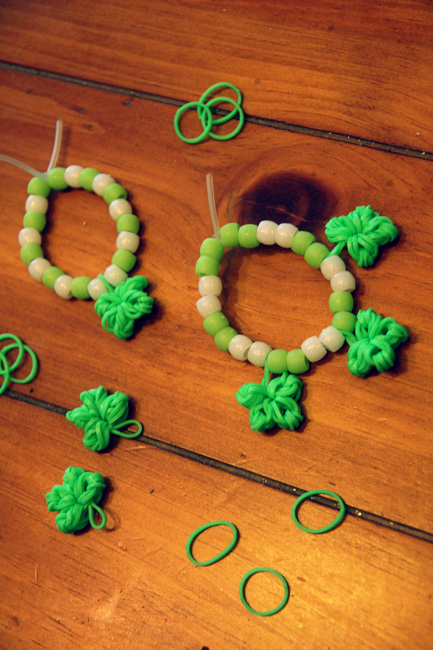
Clovers

== See also ==
- Silly Bandz
