= Groovy Girls =

Fashion doll line

Talli, a character from the Groovy Girls line of fashion dolls

Groovy Girls is a line of fashion dolls manufactured by the American toy company Manhattan Toy and launched in 1998. Each year new dolls were produced until 2019. The line was revived in 2026.

== History ==
Groovy Girls launched in 1998 as a wholesome, funky alternative to Barbie, Bratz and My Scene; each stuffed doll had different skin tones, hair types and facial features, reflecting the ethnic landscape of the world. In addition to the dolls, Manhattan Toy produced furniture, pets and even a camping kit for the dolls. The brand's lifestyle aspects were fashion, friendship, and self-expression. Groovy Girls were initially sold in specialty toy stores such as Zany Brainy and Noodle Kidoodle. Beginning in early 2005, the dolls were launched in Target stores. Following the economic crisis of 2008, they were pulled from Target's shelves and began to only be sold at specialty stores and online from then on out. As of 2005, more than eight million Groovy Girls dolls have been sold since its inception. Groovy Girls doll series had accumulated more than $141 million in sales from the time of its inception to its time of being discontinued. As of 2023, Groovy Girls continue to be sold secondhand, but no new models are being produced. Manhattan Toy was sold to Crown Crafts in March 2023 and since then the teams, staff, and products have been joined into Crown Crafts for the sale of $17 million.

== List of Groovy Girls ==
Here is a list of basic Groovy Girls by their year of release.

Some characters share names. Not counting the updated looks of the Main 6, there have been 2 dolls named Trini, 2 dolls named Vanessa, 2 dolls named Carissa, and 3 dolls named Marissa.

1998

- Lexi
- Liza
- Lupe
- Lucy

1999

- Michaela
- Max (male)
- Zane (male)
- Ziggy (male)
- Zarah
- Zoe

2000

- Gabi
- Gwenn (not to be confused with Gwen of the Main 6)
- Jacinda
- Jada
- Josie
- Janisse
- Jordan
- Jayna
- Jackson (male)
- Jarrett (male)

2001

- Sarita
- Solana
- Sesilia
- Siri
- Shika
- Sidra
- Samuel (male)
- Sean (male)
- Kinzey
- Karly
- Kayla
- Kami
- Kendra
- Kelsey

2002

- Talli
- Tomiko
- Trini
- Vanessa (light-skinned)
- Verity
- Victoria
- Kalvin (male)
- Kyle (male)

2003

- Carissa
- Cicely
- Celeste
- Bindi
- Brenna
- Britta
- Darci
- Danika
- Daphne
- Brandon (male)
- Blake (male)
- Britney

2004

- Ailene
- Angelique
- Ayanna
- Hope
- Hadlee
- Harper
- Helena

Main 6:

- Gwen
- Reese
- Oki
- O'Ryan
- Vanessa (dark-skinned)
- Yvette

2005

- Kassi
- Kylee
- Kenna
- Larissa
- Leticia
- Lourdes
- Kieran (male)

2006

- Ellie Mae (cowgirl)
- Roxanna (rock star)

Main 6 Updated:

- Gwen (2nd in a series)
- Reese (2nd in a series)
- Oki (2nd in a series)
- O'Ryan (2nd in a series)
- Vanessa (2nd in a series, dark-skinned)
- Yvette (2nd in a series)

2007

- Rayannah
- Raelyn
- Roxette
- Raina (punk)
- Ruby Mae
- Petula
- Pilar
- Phoebe

2008

- Zadie
- Zanita
- Zelma
- Fenia
- Fleur
- Franci

2009

- Corbin
- Chelsi
- Camilla
- Connor (male)
- Cadence

2010

- Tegan
- Tamae
- Thora
- Tessa
- Tamsen

2011

- Izzie
- Isadora
- Iku
- Irina
- Inga
- Inez
- Nadia
- Nina
- Nora

2012

- Amelia
- Gabriella
- Katrina
- Seanna
- Sage
- Suki

2013

- Marissa
- Myla
- Maren

2014

- Brooklyn
- Bayani
- Breanna
- Bailey
- Skylar
- Fuchsia
- Lilia
- Jasmine

2015

- Renee
- Robyn
- Rachel
- Reagan

2016

- Lola
- Lily
- Layla
- Logan

2017

- Super Groovy Girl
- Velvet
- Jessica
- Rose
- Katy
- Meghan
- Janelle
- Lorelei
- Justin

2018

- Sunshine
- Kat
- Jamie
- Princess Abi
- Princess Crystelle

2019

- Willow
- Birdie
- Primrose
- April

2026

- Rose
- Saige
- Poppy
- Iris
- Daisy

=== Poseable ===
These had wires in their arms and legs that made them able to strike different poses. They were released from 2006 to 2008.

- Andie (Go-Go Girl, 2007)
- Aleika (Breakdancer, 2007)
- Analise (Yoga, 2007)
- Adrianna (Salsa, 2007)
- Ayumi (Roller Skating, 2007)
- Anya (Ballerina, 2007)
- Trini (also released as a non-poseable, 2006)
- Taryn (also released as a non-poseable, 2006)
- Trissa (also released as a non-poseable, 2006)
- Shayla (also released as a non-poseable, 2006)
- Savanna (also released as a non-poseable, 2006)
- Brylee (Karate, 2008)
- Brandice (Unknown, 2008)
- Bella-Mae (Cowgirl, 2008)
- Selia (also released as a non-poseable, 2006)
- Bastian (male, 2008)
- Dylan (male, 2006)

=== Holiday Exclusives ===
Christmas

- Anastasia Sparkle (2008)
- Cali Candy Cane (2011)
- Chrissy Christmas (2005)
- Christa Christmas (2010)
- Garnet Glitterbella (2008)
- Holiday Hannah (2010)
- Holiday Wishes Hadley (2013)
- Molly Mistletoe (2012)
- Noella (2004)
- Snowflake Sophie (2009)
- Deck the Halls Dessa (2013)
- Sylvie Starr (2007)
- Tessa Tannenbaum (2006)
- Tyanna Tannenbaum (2006)
- Merry Marissa (2014)
- Noelle (2015)
- Christmas Belle (2016)
- Jingle Belle (2017)

Easter

- Petal (2005)
- Clara (2006)
- Elisa (2014)

Valentine's Day

- Vivica (2006)
- Valana (2005)
- Viviana (2014)

Halloween

- Ember (2006)
- Cinder-Sue (2007)
- Countessa (2005)
- Willow Witch (2004)
- Charissa Cat (2008)
- Candy Corn Carissa (2009)

=== RSVP ===
These dolls came with codes to unlock special items online. They celebrated Groovy Girls' 10th anniversary. The RSVP line dates from 2008 to 2009.

- Amara
- Alesa
- Amalina
- Latasha
- Libbi and Louie (Louie is a dog attached to Libbi's hand.)
- Lakinzie
- Lycia
- Linae
- Dela
- Denell
- Dhara
- Darise

=== Fun Packs ===
- Kali and Krista (Fashion Blizzard) October 2002
- Kassidy (Belle Espirit) March 2002
- Lailie (Birthday Girlie) 2006
- Evie (Saddle Up) 2006
- Sarina (Soccer) 2006
- Sawyer (Surfer, male) 2006
- Becca (Basketball) 2006
- Sasha (Posh Party) Late 2001
- Bindi (Vet En Vogue) 2007
- Yvette and Carissa (Sleepover Central) 2007
- Brida (Ballet) 2007
- Josh (Attitude on Wheels, male) 2006
- Charisse (Ready to Rock) 2006
- Helena (Groovy Games Swim Team) 2004
- Hadlee (Groovy Games Gymnast) 2004
- Harper (Groovy Games Soccer) 2004
- Winter Rose (Snowy Sensation) 2008
- Shauna (Spa Splendor) 2006
- Reva (Sticker Snazzmatazz) 2003
- Rochelle (Sticker Snazzmatazz) 2003
- Shatrina (Midnight Madness) 2007
- Aria (Gimme a G!) 2007

=== Troop Groovy Girls ===
These dolls were partnered up with Girl Scouts. The Troop line dates from 2007 to 2010.

- Respectful Roxi (2007)
- Friendly Fiona (2007)
- Caring Caitlin (2007)
- Courageous Camara (2007)
- Fair Faye (2009)
- Considerate Christa (2008)
- Helpful Haylee (2009)
- Strong Sierra (2008)
- Responsible Rilee (2009)
- Honest Hala (2007)
- Dinah (Daisy Girl Scout, 2010)
- Kiri (poseable, 2008)
- Ardella (poseable, 2008)

=== Dreamtastic ===
The Dreamcast line dates from 2005 to 2011.

- Melina Mermaid (2006)
- Bride Jennibelle (2007)
- Bridesmaid Melinda (2007)
- Princess Seraphina (2006, 2010)
- Princess Sharissa (2006)
- Prince Lance (2005)
- Princess Lucinda (2005)
- Flower Girl Faith (2007)
- Jennica and Gavin's Wedding (2007)
- Binni Ballerina (2006)
- Franchesca Fairy (2006)
- Bellissima Ballerina (2008)

=== Candy Kingdom ===
The Candy Kingdom doll line dates from 2007. Fatina and Dari have their pets on leashes attached to their hands.

- Dari and Dottilicious Puppy
- Fatina and Fluffy Cotton Candy Kitty
- Princess Bubblegum Bella
- Princess Candy Heart Cassidy
- Princess Lollipop Lola

=== Special Edition ===
These dolls date from 2005 to 2012.

- Rock Around The Clock Bobby and Suzy Q (2006)
- Safari Kari (2005)
- Fleurabella (2010)
- Chef Charlotte (2010)
- Irish Steppin' Adelaene (2010)
- Starletta (2008)
- Galexia (2011)
- Bianca Ballerina (2011)
- Birthday Wishes Betsy (2012)
- Fayla Fairy (2012)
- Steffi
- Lexa (Learning Express exclusive)
- Lexanne (Learning Express exclusive)
- Lynne (Ron Jon Surf Shop exclusive, 2005)

=== Chic Boutique ===
The Chic Boutique doll line dates from 2005.

- Nicole
- Natalya
- Nanette

=== Flutterflies ===
The Flutterflies doll line dates from 2010.

- Lana Ladybug
- Becca Butterfly
- Dani Dragonfly

=== Princesses ===
The princesses date from 2010 to 2015.

- Princess Leilani
- Princess Peony
- Princess Isabella
- Princess Ariana
- Princess Liliana
- Princess Dazzelina
- Princess Ella
- Princess Dahlia
- Princess Crystelle
- Princess Abi
- Princess Camellia

=== Mermaids ===
The mermaids date from 2002 to 2012.

- Marissa
- Myra
- Maya
- Macy
- Maddie
- McKenna
- Aqualina

=== Style Scents ===
These dolls date from 2015, and each one is fruity-scented. They all come with a pet as well.

- Mia - comes with pet dog Taffy and smells like watermelon
- Lilly - comes with pet cat Parfait and smells like raspberry
- Sadie - comes with pet rabbit Shortcake and smells like strawberry

=== Fairybelles ===
The fairies date from 2015.

- Nissa
- Cricket
- Breena

== Groovy Girls Sleepover Club ==
Groovy Girls Sleepover Club was a series of short, chapter books for early readers starring the main 6 Groovy Girls, who were Gwen, Reese, O'Ryan, Oki, Vanessa, and Yvette. The books each contained 80 pages and a few illustrations. The books were published from 2005 to 2006.

=== List of books ===
1. The First Pajama Party: Slumberiffic Six
2. Pranks a Lot: The Girls vs. The Boys
3. Sleepover Surprise: A Twin-Sational Birthday
4. Rock and Roll: Divas Supreme
5. Choose or Lose: How to Pick a Winner
6. The Great Outdoors: Take a Hike
7. Growing up Groovy: An Out-of-this-World Adventure
8. Girls of Summer: Bon Voyage

== Licensing and awards ==
Burger King offered miniaturized plastic as well as plush versions of Groovy Girls in its global Kids Meal program, which ran from February 12, 2007, to March 18, 2007. That year, Manhattan Toy also partnered with the Girl Scouts to develop a line extension of dolls called Troop Groovy Girls. An online community called Camp Groovy Girls launched in September, soon after the dolls became available in stores. In February 2008, the Toy Industry Association named the Girl Scouts' Troop Groovy Girls the best girl toy of the year during the American International Toy Fair in New York City. Groovy Girls had previously won "Girl Toy of the Year" and "Specialty Toy of the Year" awards at the 2003 Toy Fair.
