= Rubber band gun =

Toy gun used to fire rubber bands

A rubber band gun is a toy gun used to fire one or more rubber bands (or "elastic bands").

Rubber band guns are often used in live-action games such as Assassins, in which they are common and popular toy weapons. They are also common in offices and classrooms. Rubber band guns have been popular toys that date back to the invention of rubber bands, which were patented in England on March 17, 1845 by Stephen Perry.

== Rubber band gun types ==
=== Clothespin ===
A simple rubber band pistol using a clothespin as its firing mechanism

Clothespin rubber band guns are the simplest form of RBGs, being very easy to produce. Its firing mechanism consists solely of a clothespin with a rubber band placed between its jaws. The gun may have more than one clothespin, thereby allowing multiple shots.

=== Repeating ===
Most rubber band guns are of repeating nature, giving the user more firepower than single shot designs. They range from step-up-action guns and single rotor semi autos, to removable magazine automatic weapons. To simulate real life repeaters, there have been designs that require users to operate a bolt, pump a pump, pull back a hammer, or rack a slide. These may be impractical against other automatic rubber band guns, but give the user the psychological response of real firearms. Most repeaters fall into one of two categories:

==== Escapement ====
Escapement rubber band guns are capable of firing at least three rubber bands when fully loaded. Escapement rubber band guns are available in semi-realistic shapes, including pistols, rifles, and shotguns. They form the basis of almost all automatic rubber band gun systems.

They are usually made of wood (although many Lego-based designs have been produced), and most have a strong machined plastic firing mechanism, consisting of a rotor where bands are hooked, and an escapement mechanism that lets the rotor rotate one position, releasing a rubber band. In Lego designs, a gear is commonly used in place of a conventional rotor, and due to how fine the teeth on the gear are, the escapement allows a rotation of more than one tooth, requiring rubber bands to be loaded a set number of teeth apart.

==== Automatic ====
Fully automatic rubber band guns are similar to automatic firearms, in that the gun's mechanism is powered by the projectile (in the case of automatic rubber band guns, the potential energy stored in the stretched rubber band). Many mechanisms have been devised by various online designers such as:

- A modified releaser that simply lets to rotor spin freely when sad, and a weighted delay piece to keep the rate of fire practical. This system suffers from weight, low capacity, reduced power, and a high rate of fire, but is very simple.
- A separate rotor and releaser that are activated by either a bolt or a hammer moving by the power of launched rubber bands. This may be used to simulate moving parts on real firearms, such as slides and bolts. They can also give the user a sense of recoil.

=== Rotary ===
A rubber band rotary gun consists of between 3 and 12 repeater RBGs arranged on a cylindrical "rotor" as barrels. The rotor rotates with either a crank or a motor, and each individual barrel is fired as it reaches the top of its locus.

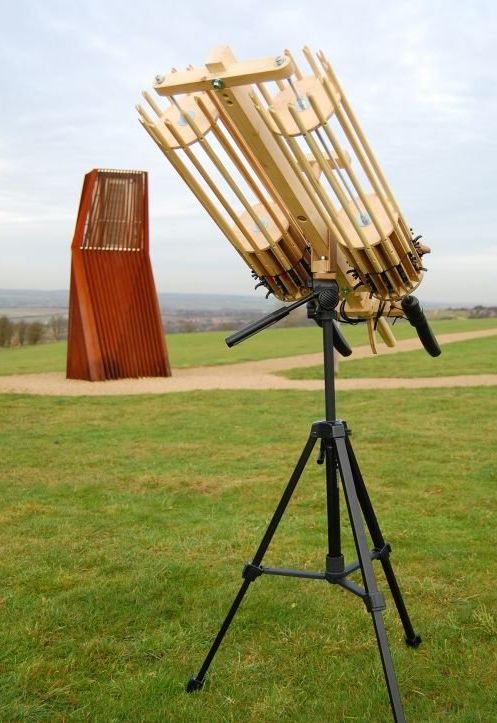
The Disintegrator atop its tripod

The original tripod-mounted rubber band rotary gun, patented by Surefire Products, was featured on the Gadget Show on UK television in March 2007 and January 2010.

A twelve-barrel rotary gun using twelve-shot repeater mechanisms can fire 144 rubber bands automatically. It is fired by manually rotating a crank handle and pulling a firing trigger.

Motorized RBGs with rotary barrels are among the latest developments in the world of rubber band guns. In November 2007, Anthony Smith completed the Disintegrator, a 288-shot motorized rubber band gun with 2 12-barrel counter-rotating rotors. This gun can be mounted on a tripod or fired from the hip, and can fire more than 40 rounds per second.

There are two common versions of the rubber band rotary gun mechanism:

==== String-operated ====
A rotor with a pre-prepared string spooled around it pulls off rubber bands one-by-one as it is unwound from the rotor and off the barrel. The string is wound around one barrel, then a rubber band placed on that barrel, then the next barrel, and so on until the string can be pulled and the bands fired.

== Materials ==
Rubber band guns can be created with many different media balancing ease of construction, reliability, and capacity:

=== Wood ===
The majority of lasting, reliable rubber band guns are made of machined wood. Among the most popular wooden RBG designers are parabellum1262, who has developed magazine-fed automatic and select-fire designs, and oggcraft, known for his unique firing mechanisms.

=== Popsicle sticks ===
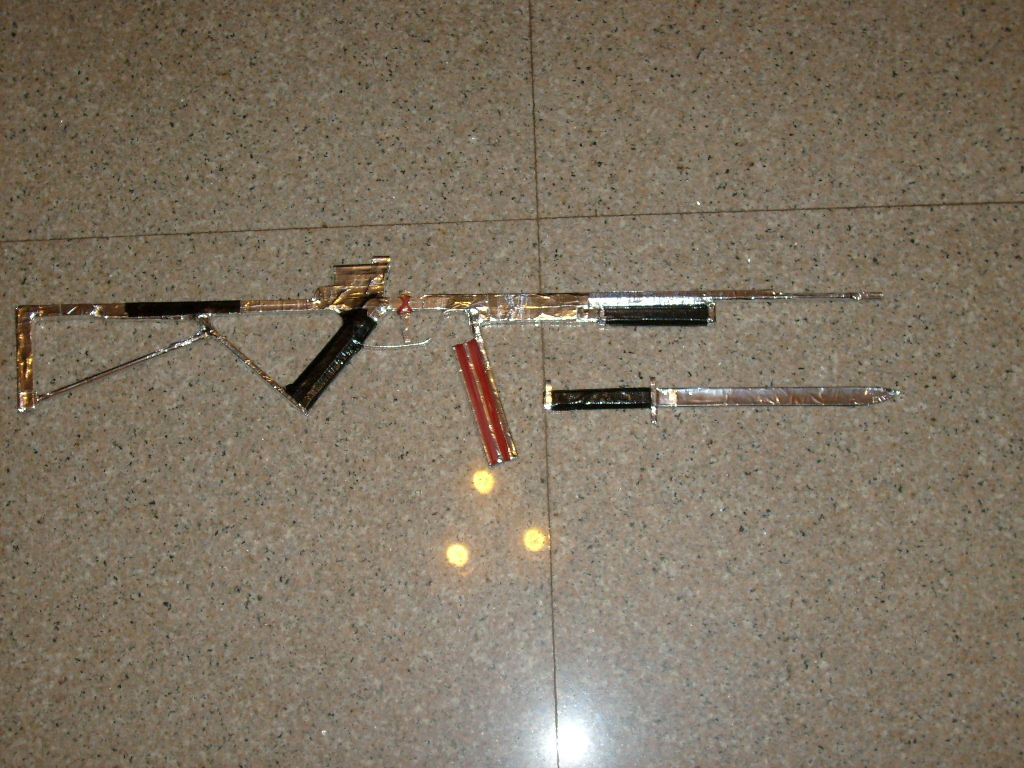
A rubber band assault rifle made with ice cream sticks, with mock bayonet removed

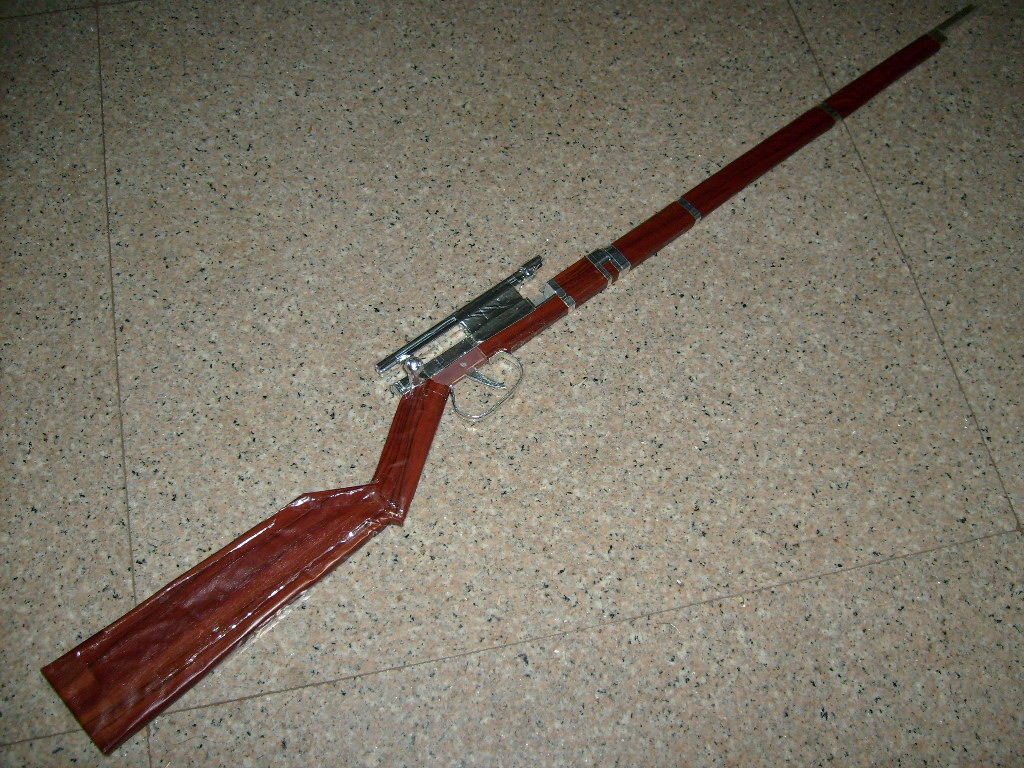
A sniper rifle-style Popsticle stick rubber band gun, with mock scope and bolt

Rubber band guns can be made from Popsicle sticks. The individual sticks are held together by either rubber bands, tape or glue. They can also be cut or carved to the required shape. It is generally limited to pistols and sniper rifles, as only one or two shots can be loaded on most guns, but semi-automatic ice-cream stick guns have been made by determined amateurs. They can also be adapted to fire arrows or other small objects with the rubber bands. In some guns, the handle doubles as a trigger, but having a separate trigger and handle provides much better accuracy.

Rubber band guns can be made using only Popsicle sticks, staples, and rubber bands of various styles and sizes. This specialized technique developed and honed by then-high school student Stuart A. Burton is very malleable and can be utilized to develop very advanced and complicated rubber band guns. For instance, using levers and sliding mechanisms, one can make a pump-action shotgun. Using simple geometry and specialized positioning, one can easily make semi-automatic and 2-shot burst-fire weapons, as well as more complicated fully automatic weapons using paperclips as an axis for a rotating firing piece. Occasionally, other materials (like bamboo skewers, for instance) may be used in the making of the gun.

Sights, foregrips and magazines to hold extra rubber bands may also be made according to the owner's preferences. Through creativity and imagination, one can make detachable sights, grips, stocks, silencers, and under-barrel shotguns or grenade launchers.

=== K'Nex ===
Rubber band guns can be built from K'Nex. Such constructions can include handheld pistols, automatics and sniper rifles. Some K'Nex guns work using the escapement mechanism seen in semi-automatic rubber band guns, while some more advanced types have hinge triggers that are more reliable, allow for more bands on a barrel, and have a more realistic trigger pull.

=== Lego ===
Most rubber band creators start out with lego, as it allows users to easily express ideas. In early 2007, Sebastian Dick built a motorized rubber band rotary gun entirely from Lego, capable of firing 11 rounds per second. Many other builders on YouTube followed suit, building string-operated miniguns, while some shoot actual bricks. Many RBGs are built out of Lego, from simple hinge guns to complex fire-rate-dampening automatic rifles. Lego rubber band gun mechanisms can also be used to launch light projectiles of various types, from small bricks and paper planes to wooden skewers. Lego rubber band guns can be quite reliable, without all the complexity of K'Nex.

It is difficult to devise a suitable, practical magazine-fed rubber band gun system out of Lego, due to the elasticity of rubber bands (which requires a mechanism to lock the retention wheel when not connected to the firing mechanism).
