= Kandi bracelet =

Type of bracelet associated with rave culture

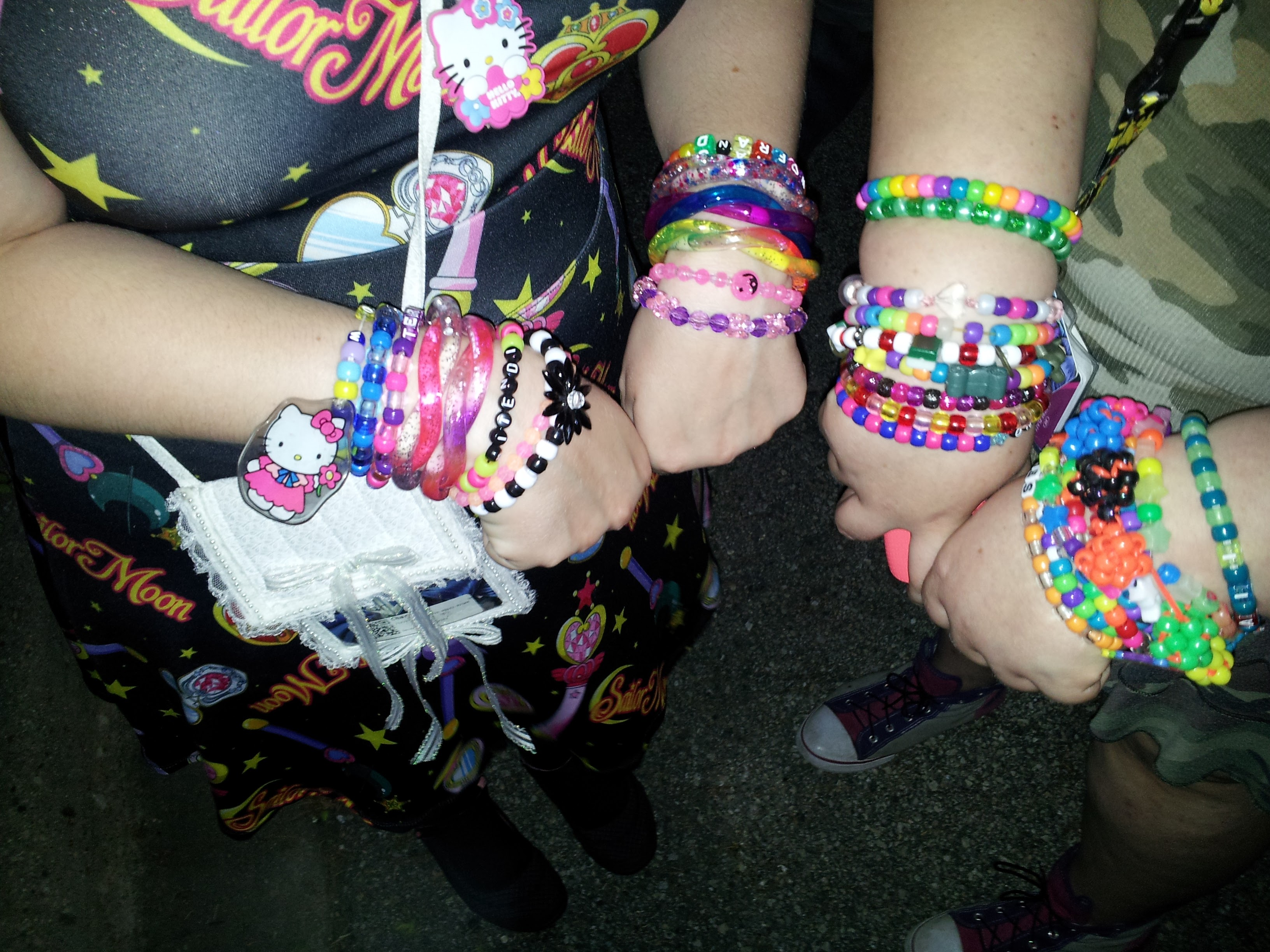
Two people wearing kandi bracelets on both of their arms

A kandi bracelet is a type of bracelet usually made out of pony beads, and is a popular type of attire in scene or rave culture, particularly kandi culture, an American phenomenon deeply rooted in US rave culture. Kandi bracelets are traditionally handcrafted, and some view store-bought kandi bracelets as diminishing their meaning of 'unity'. They are frequently made with rainbow or lettered beads. "Kandi kids" is a term for those in the kandi trading subculture.

== History ==
The term 'kandi' may come from the phrase 'candy necklace'; when pronounced out loud, kandi and candy sound the same. They started appearing in the early 1990s South California Rave scene. Kandi bracelets may have evolved out of friendship bracelets; friendship bracelets are often handmade and exchanged to commemorate a friendship, like kandi bracelets. This same style of bracelets, but under the more general name of "friendship bracelets", have been traded at Taylor Swift shows in the 2020s.

== PLUR and trading ==
The PLUR handshake is done when exchanging kandi bracelets, with each element of the acronym represented by a step. Kandi bracelets kept on the right arm are available to trade, while those on the left arm are not. Sometimes, the words are said as the gestures are done:

- "Peace": A peace sign is made, and the two fingertips are each touched to each other.
- "Love": Half of a hand heart is made by each party, with the two combining to form a single heart.
- "Unity": Hands are clasped together, as in a high five.
- "Respect": Fingers are clasped together. Kandi bracelets are, one at a time, moved to the other party's hand, using the free arm.

Often, the PLUR handshake is followed by a hug.

== Terminology ==
Kandi bracelets have kandi-specific terms to describe them. Stitch is an umbrella term regarding the specific types of kandi; the three most common stitches are multistitch (even tubular peyote stitch), flat peyote stitch (even and odd), and x base. Cuffs are any form of kandi bracelet that uses multiple rows of beads.
