= PLUR =

Principles of rave culture

Peace Love Unity Respect, commonly shortened to PLUR, is a set of principles that is associated with rave culture, originating in the United States. It has been commonly used since the early 1990s when it became commonplace in nightclub and rave flyers and especially on club paraphernalia advertising underground outdoor trance music parties. It has since expanded to the larger rave dance music culture as well.

== PLUR and rave culture ==
PLUR can be interpreted as the essential philosophy of life and ethical guideline for ravers and clubbers, at least insomuch as it relates to interpersonal relationships, with basic directions on how people are expected to behave at a rave gathering or in a dance club. This universalist philosophy underpinning the tribal dance culture which began circling the globe with the rise of the internet, theoretically takes precedence over any chemical or musical aspects of the rave scene. Raves represent a modern ritualistic experience, promoting a strong communal sense, where PLUR is considered an ideology. The four terms, among others – "Peace, Love, Freedom, Tolerance, Unity, Harmony, Expression, Responsibility and Respect" – are also part of the anonymous "Raver's Manifesto" (claimed to be written by Maria Pike in 2001) which has widely been spread among the international rave subculture.

The PLUR handshake is used in kandi bracelet trading.

== Elements ==
- Peace – The gentle resolution of negative emotions and conflict.
- Love – Performing acts and sharing feelings of goodwill towards others. The exchange of gestures such as hugging occurs frequently at a rave, and is considered a way of "spreading the love."
- Unity – Welcoming others into the community, and coming together regardless of personal differences.
- Respect – Showing sensitivity for the feelings of others, and accepting one another with tolerance and without judgement. Treating each other as one would like to be treated.

== Origins ==
PLUR is an aggregation of ideas that were part of the earlier hippie and peace movement ("peace", "love") and Black and hip hop culture ("respect"). Specific use of the term dates to the early 1990s rave scene. One of the most influential uses of the term was made by DJ Frankie Bones in June 1993. In response to a fight in the audience of one of his Storm Raves in Brooklyn, Bones took the microphone and proclaimed: "If you don't start showing some peace, love, and unity, I'll break your faces." It is also reported that as early as "on July 4, 1990, [...] Frankie's brother and Storm Rave collaborator Adam X painted 'Peace Love Unity' on a train car". The fourth term, "Respect" was championed by Laura La Gassa (wife of Brian Behlendorf).

== Variations ==
Another variation is PLURR - Peace. Love. Unity. Respect. Responsibility.

Several other variations on the same four words, but in a different order (e.g. LURP), have been proposed. However, none of these are commonly used.

Another variation is PLUM, with "M" standing for "movement". Also, the first three elements, "Peace, Love, Unity" are used separately. An example for this is the title of DJ Hype's 1996 track "Peace, Love & Unity".

Later incarnations and variations of PLUR can be seen in the adoption of Pronoia and also Ubuntu, with PLUR and Pronoia often being interchangeable terms, depending upon one's company.
