= Rubber band =

Short circular highly elastic rubber loop

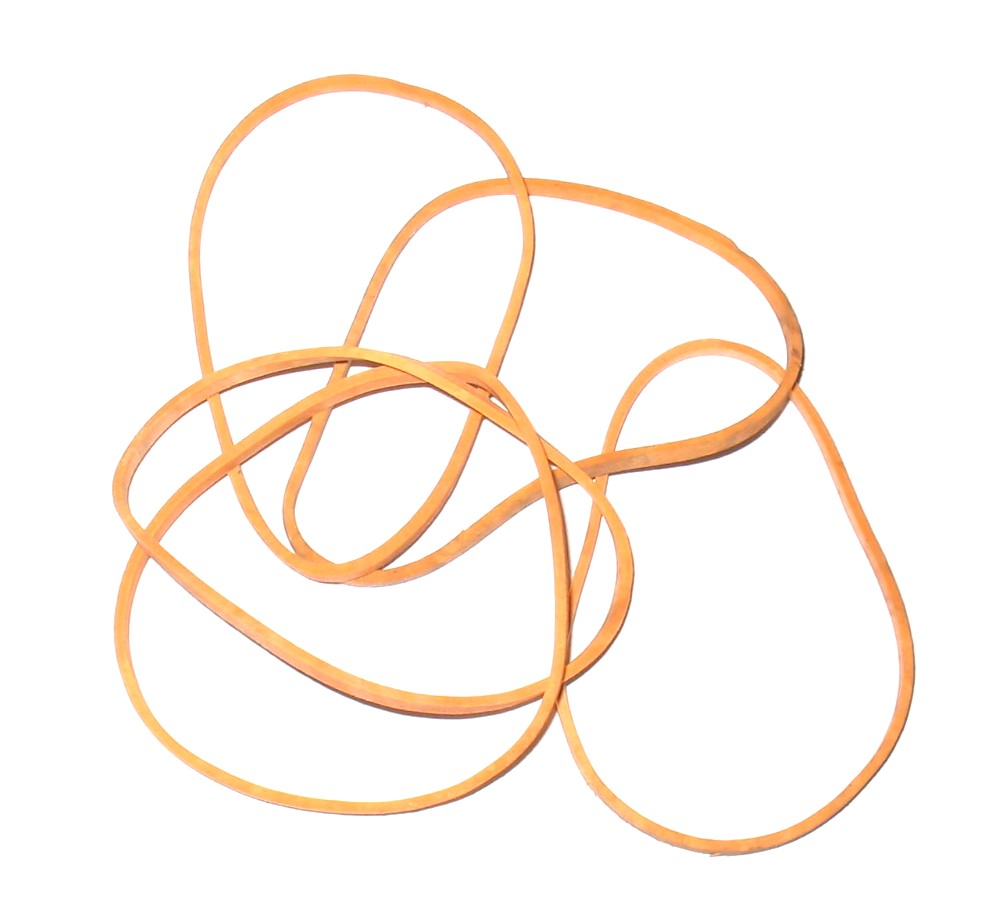
Standard amber rubber bands

A rubber band (also known as an elastic band) is a loop of rubber, usually ring or oval shaped, and commonly used to hold multiple objects together. The rubber band was patented in England on March 17, 1845, by Stephen Perry. They were originally used to hold papers and envelopes. Most rubber bands are manufactured out of natural rubber as well as for latex-free rubber bands or, especially at larger sizes, a synthetic elastomer, and are sold in a variety of sizes.

Notable developments in the evolution of rubber bands began in 1923 when William H. Spencer obtained a few Goodyear inner tubes and cut the bands by hand in his basement, where he founded Alliance Rubber Company. Spencer persuaded the Akron Beacon Journal as well as the Tulsa World to try wrapping their newspapers with one of his rubber bands to prevent them from blowing across lawns. He went on to pioneer other new markets for rubber bands such as: agricultural and industrial applications and a myriad of other uses. Spencer obtained a patent on February 19, 1957, for a new "Method for Making Elastic Bands" which produced rubber bands in an Open Ring design.

== Manufacturing ==
Most rubber, whether it is natural or synthetic, normally arrives at the manufacturing facility in large bales. Rubber bands are made by extruding the rubber into a long tube to provide its general shape. There are a number of different methods that can be applied at this point in the manufacturing process. Originally, and in some instances still today, the rubber tubes will then be placed on mandrels, curing the rubber with heat, and then slicing them across the width of the tube into little bands. This causes the tube to split into multiple sections, creating rubber bands. This is most commonly known as an "off-line" rubber extrusion process.

While other rubber products may use synthetic rubber, most rubber bands are primarily manufactured using natural rubber because of its superior elasticity.

Natural rubber originates from the latex of the rubber tree, which is acquired by tapping into the bark layers of the rubber tree. Rubber trees belong to the spurge family (Euphorbiaceae) and only survive in hot, humid tropical climates near the equator, so the majority of latex is produced in the Southeast Asian countries of Malaysia, Thailand, and Indonesia. Once the latex has been tapped and is exposed to the air, it begins to harden and become elastic, or rubbery.

== Rubber band sizes ==
=== Measuring ===
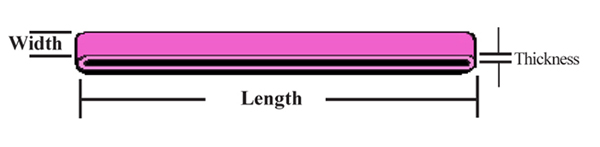
Measuring a rubber band

A rubber band is usually measured in three basic dimensions: the flat length, cut width, and wall thickness. The flat length is the total unstretched length. Perpendicular to the flat length is the cut width. Wall thickness is generally measured using tools such as calipers or pin gauges. The wall thickness determines the band's strength and durability.

If one imagines a rubber band during manufacture, that is, a long tube of rubber on a mandrel, before it is sliced into rubber bands, the band's width is decided by how far apart the slices are cut, and its length by the circumference of the tube.

=== Size numbers ===
A rubber band is assigned an industry-standard number based on its dimensions. The first use of rubber band size numbers can be traced back to the early 20th century. While it is difficult to pinpoint an exact date, the practice of categorizing rubber bands by size allowed to easily select the appropriate rubber band for their specific needs. Standards for the rubber band were established in the United States in 1925 by the Department of Commerce, Bureau of Standards and is the first known publication to reference rubber band size.

Generally, rubber bands are numbered from smallest to largest, width first. Thus, rubber bands numbered 8–19 are all 1/16 inch wide, with lengths going from 7/8 inch to 3 1/2 inches. Rubber band numbers 30–35 are for width of 1/8 inch, going again from shorter to longer. For even longer bands, the numbering starts over for numbers above 100, again starting at width 1/16 inch.

Rubber band sizes
| Size | Length (in) | Width (in) | Thickness (in) |
| 10 | 1 1/4 | 1/16 | 1/32 |
| 12 | 1 3/4 | 1/16 | 1/32 |
| 14 | 2 | 1/16 | 1/32 |
| 31 | 2 1/2 | 1/8 | 1/32 |
| 32 | 3 | 1/8 | 1/32 |
| 33 | 3 1/2 | 1/8 | 1/32 |
| 61 | 2 | 1/4 | 1/32 |
| 62 | 2 1/2 | 1/4 | 1/32 |
| 63 | 3 | 1/4 | 1/32 |
| 64 | 3 1/2 | 1/4 | 1/32 |
| 117 | 7 | 1/16 | 1/32 |

== Thermodynamics ==
Temperature affects the elasticity of a rubber band in an unusual way. Heating causes the rubber band to contract and cooling causes expansion. Stretching a rubber band will cause it to release heat, while releasing it after it has been stretched will make it absorb heat, causing its surroundings to become a little cooler. This effect is due to the higher entropy of the unstressed state, which is more entangled and therefore has more states available. In other words, the ability to convert thermal energy into work while the rubber relaxes is allowed by the higher entropy of the relaxed state.

The result is that a rubber band behaves somewhat like an ideal monatomic gas inasmuch as (to good approximation) that elastic polymers do not store any potential energy in stretched chemical bonds. No elastic work is done to "stretch" molecules when work is done upon these bulk polymers. Instead, all work done to the rubber is "released" (not stored) and appears immediately in the polymer as thermal energy. Conversely, when the polymer does work on the surroundings (such as contracting to lift an object) it converts thermal energy to work in the process and cools in the same manner as an ideal gas, expanding while doing work.

== Red rubber bands ==
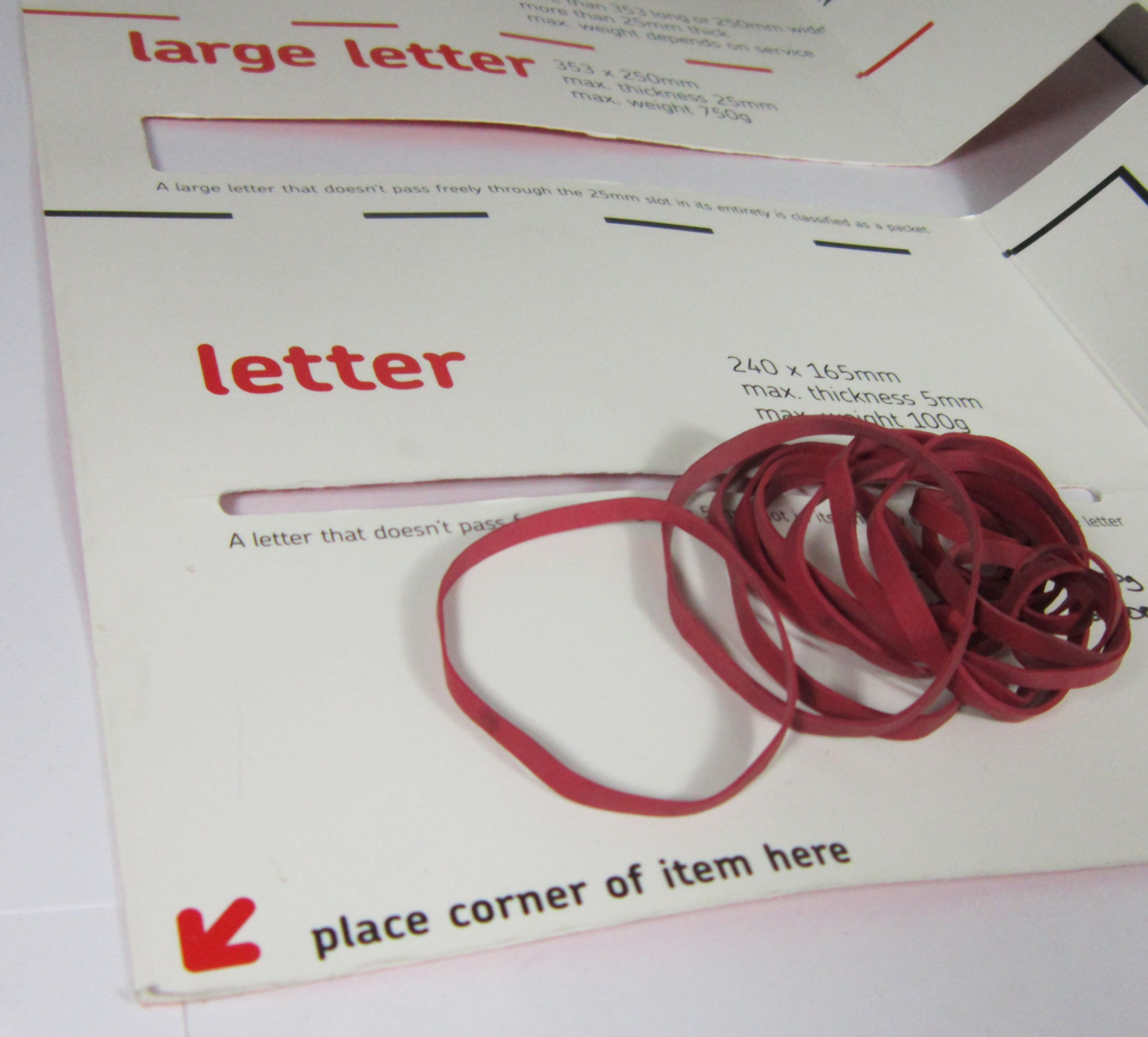
≈10 Royal Mail rubber bands, on a letter size guide

In the UK during 2004, following complaints from the public about postal carriers creating litter by discarding the rubber bands which they used to keep their mail together, the Royal Mail introduced red bands for their workers to use: it was hoped that, as the bands were easier to spot than the traditional brown ones and since only the Royal Mail used them, employees would see (and feel compelled to pick up) any red bands which they had inadvertently dropped. As of 2006, some 342 million red bands were being used per year. The Royal Mail no longer uses red rubber bands as of about 2010. The exact date of the expunging of these is uncertain, presumably as different areas used up old stock at varying rates.

== Rubber bands in orthodontics ==
Special rubber bands of medical-grade latex can be used (worn) for orthodontic correction of teeth position together with metal braces or clear aligners to apply additional pressure on the teeth being straightened. These rubber bands are manufactured in different sizes for use in the varying steps of Orthodontic treatment. They are often termed orthodontic elastics.

== Ranger bands ==
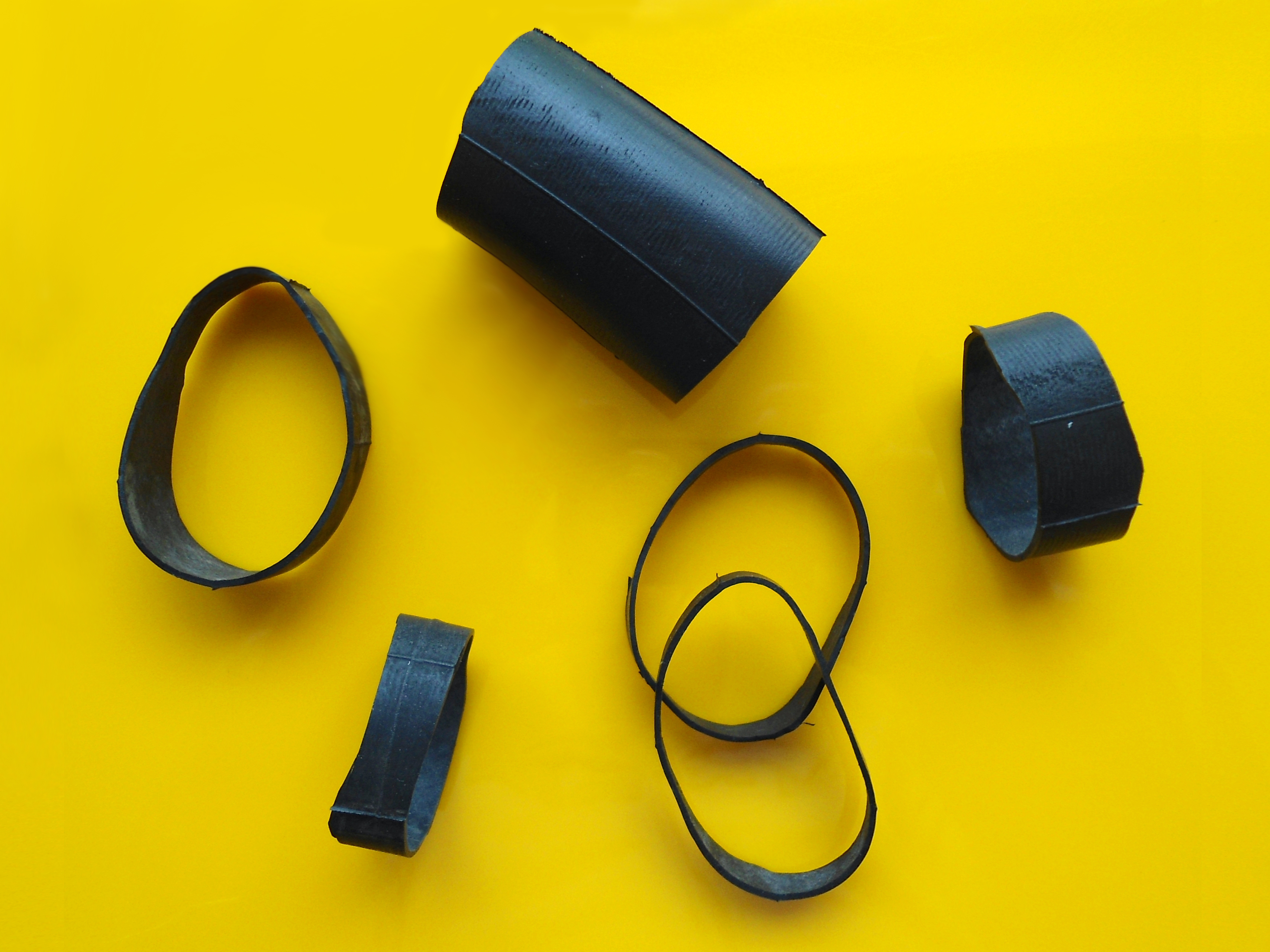
Ranger bands made from moped inner tube

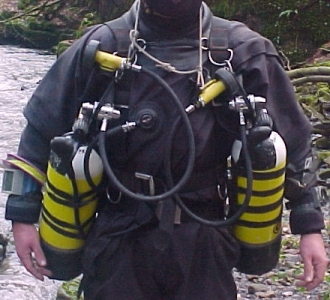
British cave diving style sidemount harness showing snoopy loops used to stow hoses against the cylinders

This type of rubber band was popularized by use in the military. Ranger bands are essentially sections of tire inner tubing cut into various sizes. They have the advantage of being versatile, durable, and resistant to weather and abrasion. They are commonly used for lashings, and can also be used for makeshift handle grips, providing a strong high-friction surface with excellent shock absorption.

Identical loops of inner tube are used by cavers and cave divers, and in that context are called snoopy loops by the British caving and cave diving community. When they get lost they are recognizable as a common form of litter.

Snoopy loops are easily cut from discarded car and motorcycle inner tubes using a pair of scissors. A knife cut may leave a notched edge which can lead to tearing. Varying sizes of inner tube are used for different tasks. Uses in caving include sealing cuffs of oversuits and collars of boots against the ingress of water, holding kneepads and elbow pads in place or securing dive lines to small rocks. and have been used for first aid for strapping injured joints tightly in place.

Technical divers use small snoopy loops made from bicycle inner tubes to prevent backup lights clipped to a dive harness from dangling, and larger loops cut from car tubes are used to stow hoses against sling or sidemount cylinders.

The exact origin is unknown and has been subject to much speculation. The practice of using snoopy Loops has been claimed to have originated in Greece and spotted by Cave Diving Group members in the late 1970s. The practice was then propagated in Yorkshire Dales. Another claim is that snoopy loops were named by Dave Morris, a Cave Diving Group caver who noticed how they 'snooped' around boulders. It was considered a ridiculous name at the time. None of these claims are particularly plausible as the use is obvious and is likely to have originated independently in several places at earlier dates.

== Elastration ==
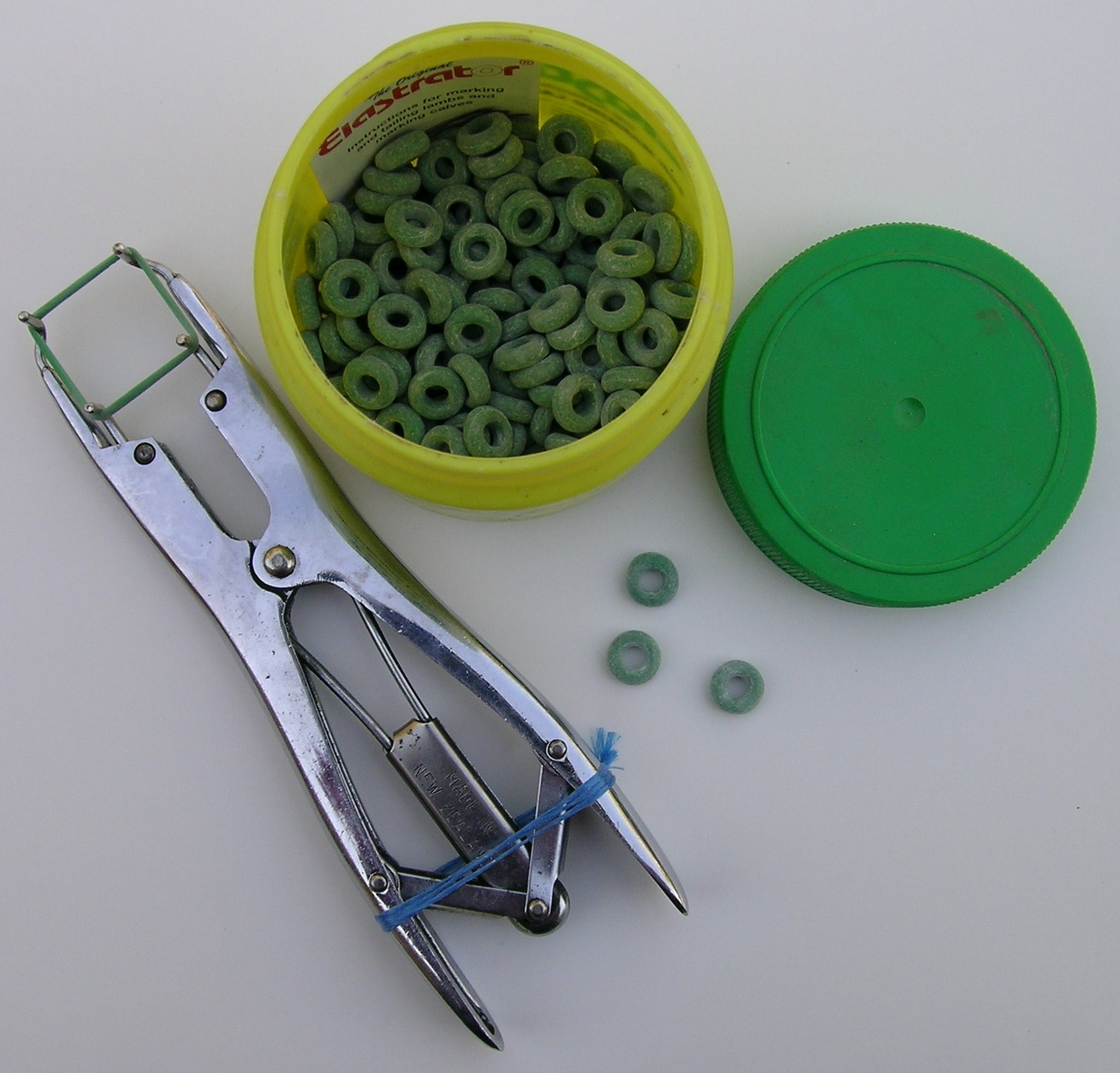
Latex rubber elastrator rings and pliers

In animal husbandry, rubber bands are used for docking and castration of livestock. The procedure involves banding the body part with a tight latex (rubber) band to restrict blood flow. As the blood flow diminishes, the cells within the gonads die and dehydrate. The part eventually drops off.

== Model use ==
Rubber bands have long been one of the methods of powering small free-flight model aircraft, the rubber band being anchored at the rear of the fuselage and connected to the propeller at the front. To 'wind up' the 'engine', the propeller is repeatedly turned, twisting the rubber band. When the propeller has had enough turns, the propeller is released and the model launched, the rubber band then turning the propeller rapidly until it has unwound.

One of the first to use this method was pioneer aerodynamicist George Cayley, who used rubber band-driven motors for powering his small experimental models. These 'rubber motors' have also been used for powering small model boats.

== Balls ==
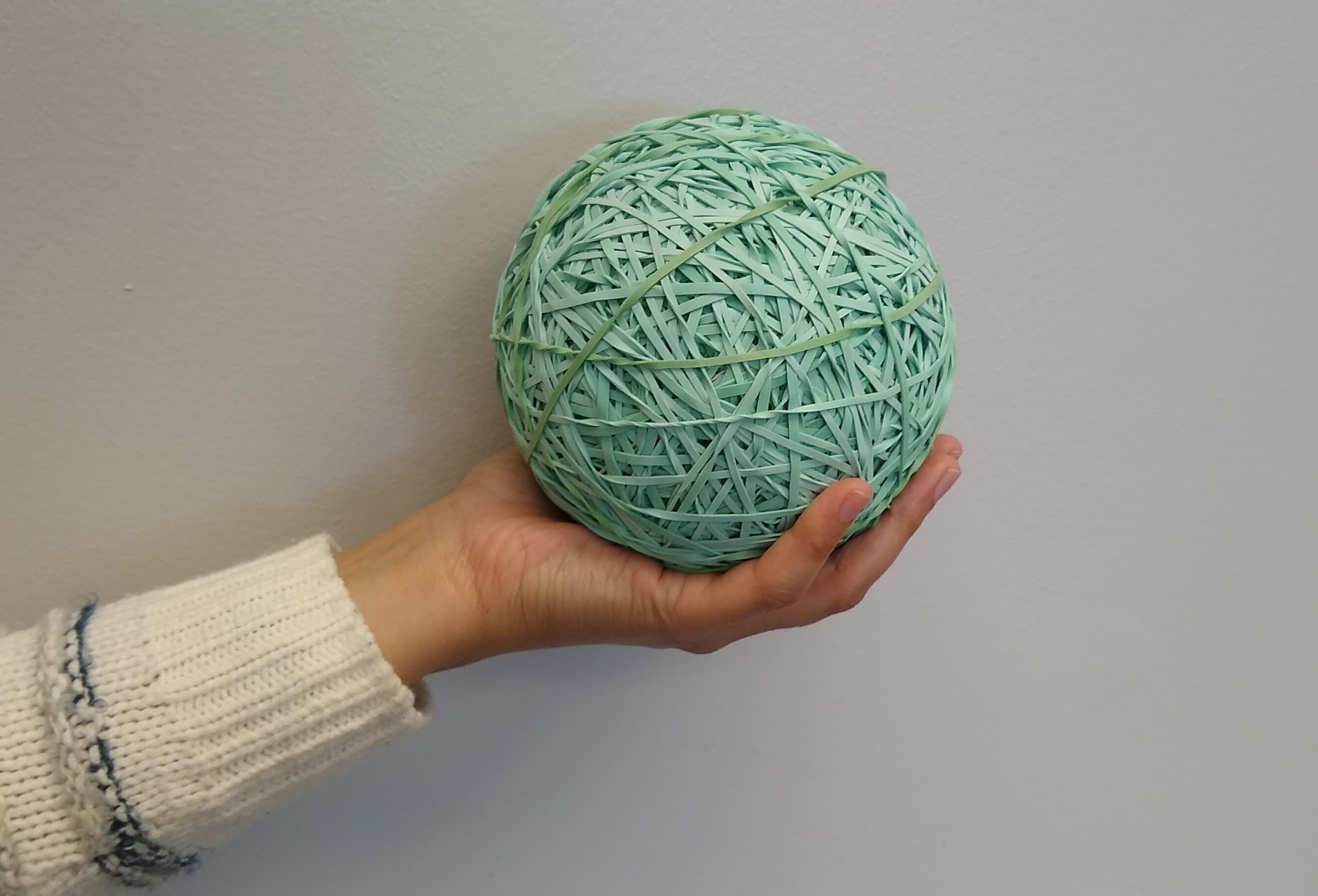
A rubber band ball made from over 3,000 individual rubber bands

A rubber band ball is a sphere of rubber bands made by using a knotted single band as a starting point and then wrapping rubber bands around the center until the desired size is achieved. The ball is usually made from 100% rubber bands, but some instructions call for using a marble, a crumpled piece of paper, or a ping-pong ball as a starting point.

=== Notable rubber band balls ===
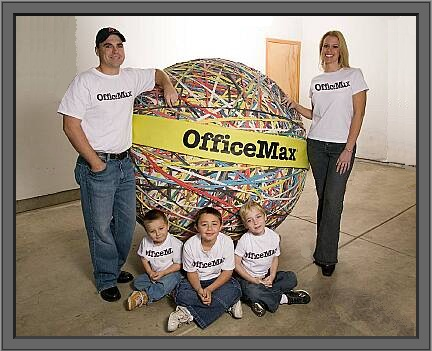
Milton's former world record size ball

The world's largest rubber band ball as of November 19, 2008, was created by Joel Waul of Lauderhill, Florida. He is currently the World Record Holder according to the Guinness World Records. The ball, which previously sat under a tarp in Waul's driveway, weighs 9,032 pounds (4,097 kg), is more than 6 ft 7 in (2.01 m) tall (which implies about a 20.68 feet (6.30 m) circumference), and consists of more than 700,000 rubber bands. It set the world record on November 13, 2008, in Lauderhill, Florida. The ball is now owned by Ripley's Believe It or Not!.

Steve Milton of Eugene, Oregon, previously held the record for the biggest rubber band ball beginning in 2006. During the construction of his rubber band ball, he was sponsored by OfficeMax, who sent him rubber bands to use for his ball. His ball was approximately 175,000 rubber bands, 5.479 feet (1.670 m) tall (circumference: 18.996 feet (5.790 m)), and weighed 2,088.14 kilograms (4,603.6 lb). He began building the ball, with help from his family, in November, 2005 and would store the ball in their garage.

Before Steve Milton, the record was held by John Bain of Wilmington, Delaware, beginning in 1998. In 2003, his ball weighed around 3,120 pounds (1,420 kg), consisting of over 850,000 rubber bands and is 1.52 metres (5 ft 0 in) tall (circumference: 4.6 metres (15 ft)). He put the ball up for auction in 2005, but he and his ball participated in Guinness World Records Day 2006. The bands were donated by two companies: Alliance Rubber and Textrip Ltd./Stretchwell Inc.

The former world record was set in 1978.

| Date | Name | Place | Diameter | C | Weight | Bands |
|---|---|---|---|---|---|---|
| Nov 13, 2008 | Joel; Waul | Lauderhill, Florida | 6 ft 7 in (2.01 m) | 23 ft (7.0 m) | 4.516 t | ≈726,500 |
| Nov, 2006 | Steve; Milton | Eugene, Oregon | 5 ft 6 in (1.68 m) | 19 ft (5.8 m) | 2.3018 t | ≈175,000 |
| 1998 | John; Bain | Wilmington, Delaware | 4 feet (1.2 m) | 12 feet 8 in (3.86 m) | 1.004 t | unknown |

== See also ==
- Hair tie
- Rainbow Loom
- Rubber band gun
- Silly Bandz
