= Friendship bracelet =

Bracelet given as a symbol of friendship

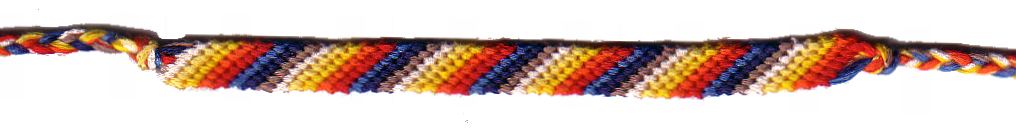
Friendship bracelet – easy stripe form

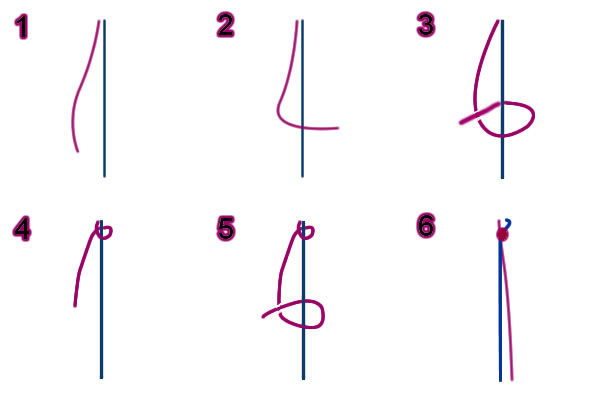
Step-by-step diagram of basic knot associated with friendship bracelets

A friendship bracelet is a decorative bracelet given by one person to another as a symbol of friendship. Friendship bracelets are often handmade, usually of embroidery floss or thread and are a type of macramé. There are various styles and patterns, but most are based on the same simple half-hitch knot. They represent a friendship that is strong and everlasting.

The amount of thread used in bracelets varies depending on the pattern. The smallest pattern, a double chain knot, requires two strings while the candy stripe can have three or more strings depending on the desired thickness.

== History ==
Friendship bracelets are ancient, but their resurgence is modern. The modern popularity of friendship bracelets started in the 1980s when they were seen during protests about the disappearances of Mayan Indians and peasants in Guatemala. The friendship bracelets were brought into the United States by religious groups for use in political rallies.

Friendship bracelets can have many meanings and symbolic uses, such as friendship, folk art, or social statements. Although it is generally accepted that the origins of these colorful bands lie with the indigenous people of Central and South America, some decorative knots can be traced back to China from 481 to 221 BC.

Friendship bracelets first became popular in the United States during the 1970s. As they are unisex, they are commonly worn by both male and female teenagers and children. They are now popular throughout the world. Friendship bracelets can be worn on various occasions; for example, they are ideal as a fashion accessory at the beach because they are made of materials that will not be easily destroyed and with which one can swim freely.

Friendship bracelets at Taylor Swift's The Eras Tour

Friendship bracelets experienced a surge in popularity in 2023, which was attributed to American singer-songwriter Taylor Swift's song "You're on Your Own, Kid" from her tenth studio album Midnights (2022). Inspired by the lyric "So make the friendship bracelets / Take the moment and taste it / You've got no reason to be afraid", Swift's fans made friendship bracelets to gift or trade to each other at her Eras Tour concerts, as well as screenings of the accompanying concert film.

== Folklore ==
It is customary to tie a bracelet around a friend's wrist as a token of friendship and to make a wish at that same moment. The bracelet should be worn until it is totally worn out and falls off by itself to honour the hard work and love put into making it. The moment at which the band falls off on its own, the wish is supposed to come true.

== Missanga ==
Missanga or misanga (from Portuguese: miçanga, which means "beads") is an international good luck charm made from knotted embroidery floss, thread or gimp. Similar to friendship bracelets, it is made with basic knots as well as patterning techniques. Its basic structure is a three thread plaited braid. It is becoming a popular portable craft project.

== Patterns ==
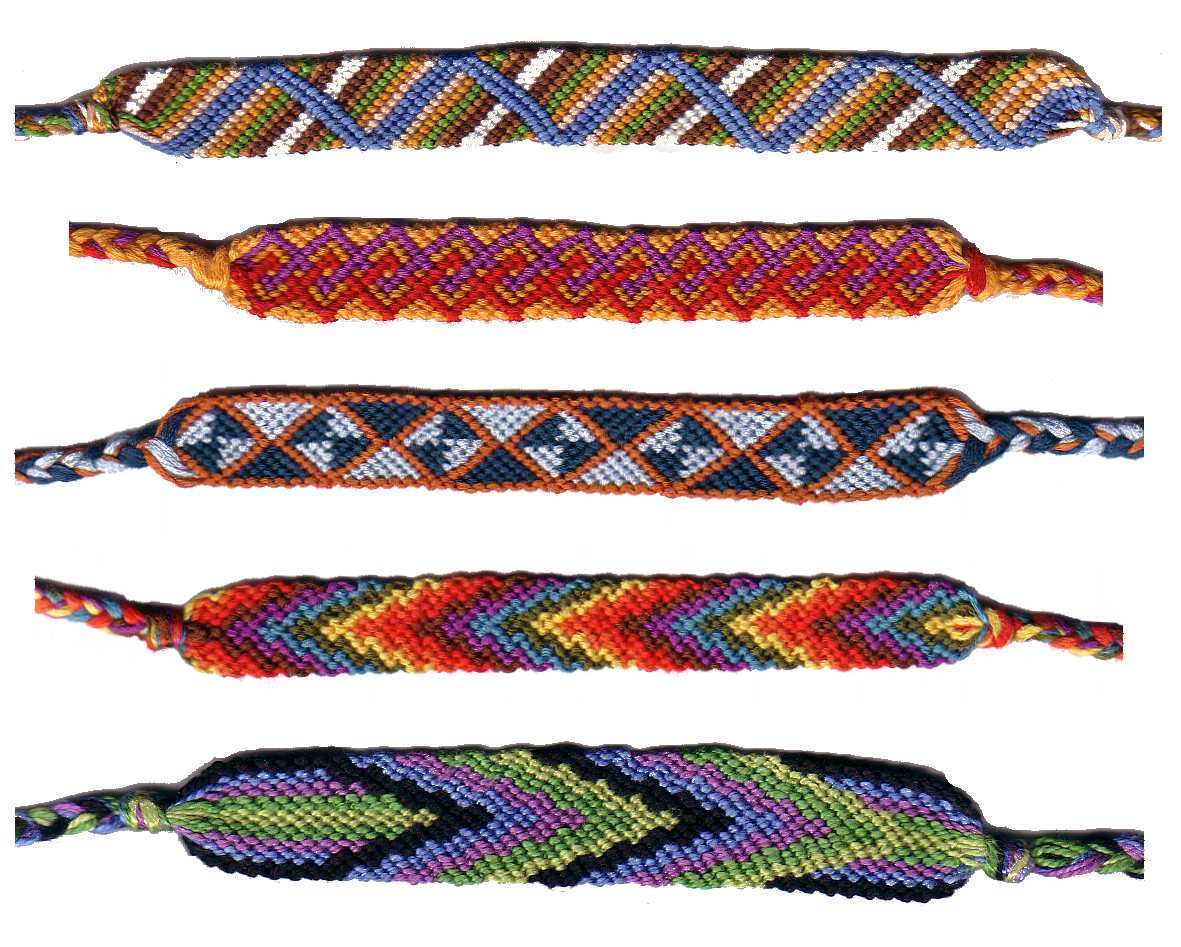
Friendship bracelets in a variety of diagonally-tied patterns

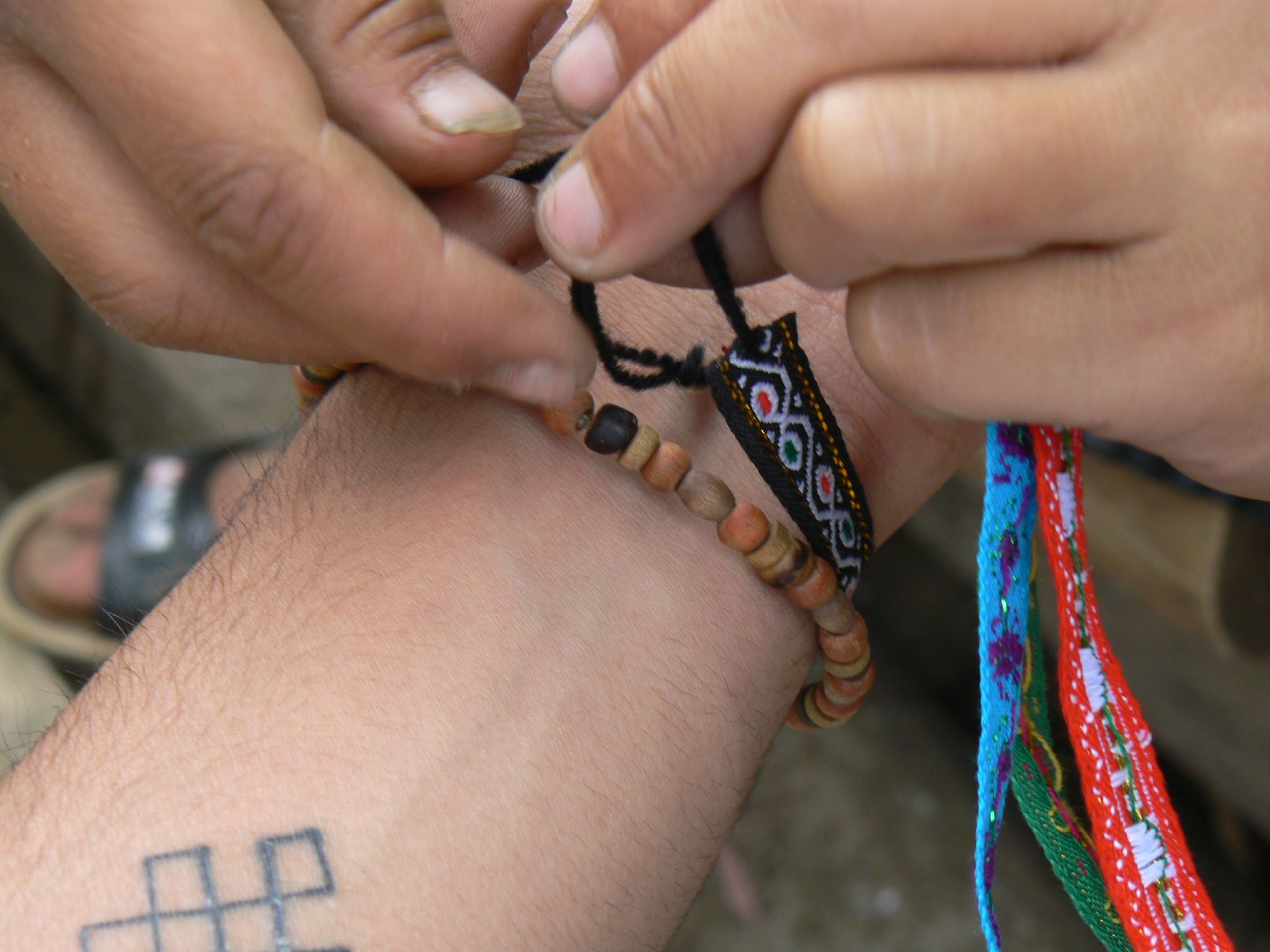
Tying a friendship bracelet

There are different types of friendship bracelets, for example "normal bracelets" or "alpha bracelets", that are tied in different ways. Normal bracelets are tied diagonally while alpha bracelets are tied horizontally.

For each of the different types of friendship bracelets there is a large number of different patterns that get passed on from person to person; patterns may also be found in books or on websites. The number of possible patterns is extremely large. Only the most well known and most commonly used ones have names. These names vary slightly depending on location.

- Alpha bracelets - knots are tied horizontally instead of diagonally, allowing for the creation of letters and symbols
  - Name/word bracelets
  - Rag rug
- Normal bracelets - knots are tied diagonally
  - 1212 – uses only forward-backward and backward-forward knots, allowing for the creation of letters and symbols
  - Arrowhead
  - Braid
  - Candystripe – basic diagonal stripes
    - Flip flop candy stripe or flip flop zig zag
  - Chevron
    - Bordered chevron
    - Double chevron
    - Fishbone chevron
    - Inverse chevron
    - Polka-dot chevron
  - Diamonds
  - Hearts
    - Mini hearts
  - Starburst
  - Plaid
  - Zig zag
- Other bracelets
  - Chinese staircase
  - Double chain knot
  - Knitted bracelets
  - Swirl and braids (a combination of a braid and Chinese staircase)
  - Wrapped bracelets
  - Zipper bracelets
- Shaped bracelets – bracelets that have edges that are not straight or that have holes
  - Chain bracelets
    - Broken ladder (a combination of the chevron and the Chinese staircase)
    - Daisy chain
  - Totem Pole
  - Zolino

== See also ==
- Braid
- Kandi bracelet
- Kumihimo
- Macramé
- Paracord
- Raksha Bandhan
- Rainbow Loom
- Scoubidou
- Wonder Loom
