= Alliance Rubber Company =

American rubber band manufacturer

- Company type: Private
- Industry: Rubber manufacturing
- Founded: March 7, 1923; 102 years ago in Alliance, Ohio
- Founder: W.H.Spencer
- Headquarters: Hot Springs, Arkansas, United States
- Area served: Worldwide
- Key people: Bonnie Spencer Swayze (President), Jason Risner (V.P. of Sales and Marketing), Brandon Hughes (V.P. of Operations), and Misty Smith (Creative Director)
- Products: Natural rubber extrusions; Synthetic rubber extrusions; Silicone rubber extrusions; Thermoplastic elastomer extrusions; EPDM rubber extrusions
- Number of employees: 176 (2018)
- Website: rubberband.com

Alliance Rubber Company is an American manufacturer of natural rubber bands. The company was originally located in Alliance, Ohio, but is now headquartered in Hot Springs, Arkansas. It was founded by William H. Spencer in 1923.

== History ==
Originally, Alliance rubber bands were made from cutting rejected rubber inner tubes. Spencer took the bands to the Akron Beacon Journal and persuaded them to wrap their newspapers with a band to prevent them from coming apart and blowing across lawns.

Alliance went on to expand its business in 1944 with an additional production plant in Hot Springs, Arkansas. In 1976, William H. Spencer retired from the day-to-day operations and passed on the management of the business to other family members.

In March 2020, Alliance announced that they would retool their manufacturing facility to create products (such as Rubber Strips) used to manufacture personal protective equipment (PPE) to mitigate the COVID-19 pandemic.
