= Stephen Perry (inventor) =

British inventor and businessman

Stephen Perry was a 19th-century British inventor and businessman credited with the invention of the rubber band. His corporation was the Messers Perry and Co,. Rubber Manufacturers of London, which made early products from vulcanised rubber, only recently perfected by Charles Goodyear in 1839. On 17 March 1845, Perry received a patent for the rubber band.

Vulcanisation, a chemical process for converting polymers into more durable materials, gave the rubber a higher tensile strength, improved its resistance to abrasion and allowed the elastic to remain flexible and supple over a wider range of temperatures.
