= Wonder Loom =

Rubber band toy

Wonder Loom is a toy loom designed for children, used mainly as a way for them to create colorful bracelets and charms by weaving rubber bands together into Brunnian links.

It was designed in 2013 by Choon's Designs LLC of Wixom, Michigan and licensed to The Beadery Craft Products in Hope Valley, Rhode Island as the exclusive manufacturer.

== Description ==
The Wonder Loom is a plastic pegboard style loom measuring 2.25 inches (57 mm) by 11.75 inches (298 mm) with 3 rows of rounded C-shaped pegs. colorful, latex free elastics are placed on the pins and then looped using a hooked picking tool. This produces strings of interconnected loops called Brunnian links, which depending on the pattern used, forms jewelry, headbands, keychains, action figures or other shapes when removed.

The Wonder Loom kit includes a loom, which features patented channels and flanges to make the looping easier, a picking tool, C-clip fasteners, and an assortment of 600 rubber bands.

== History ==
The Wonder Loom was created by Cheong Choon Ng, who is also the creator of the Rainbow Loom, when Walmart and other retailers requested a made-in-the-USA version of the toy. After reworking the loom to simplify the design, Ng licensed the Wonder Loom to The Beadery Craft Products as the exclusive US manufacturer. The product became available for purchase at Wal-Mart stores for $12.88 on 8 November 2013 and shipped 150,000 units per week through the 2013 holiday season and into 2014.

The Wonder Loom also inspired several instructional books to be published. These include:

- Wonder Loom: Bracelets and Things
- Rubber Band Loom Crafts
- Wonder Loom: Beyond the Basics

Since its release, new products have been added to the line, including new band colors, assortments, beads, and charms to attach to the bracelets. The Beadery also announced a smaller handheld version called the HandyLoom and other new tools and accessories being revealed later in 2014.

== Gallery ==
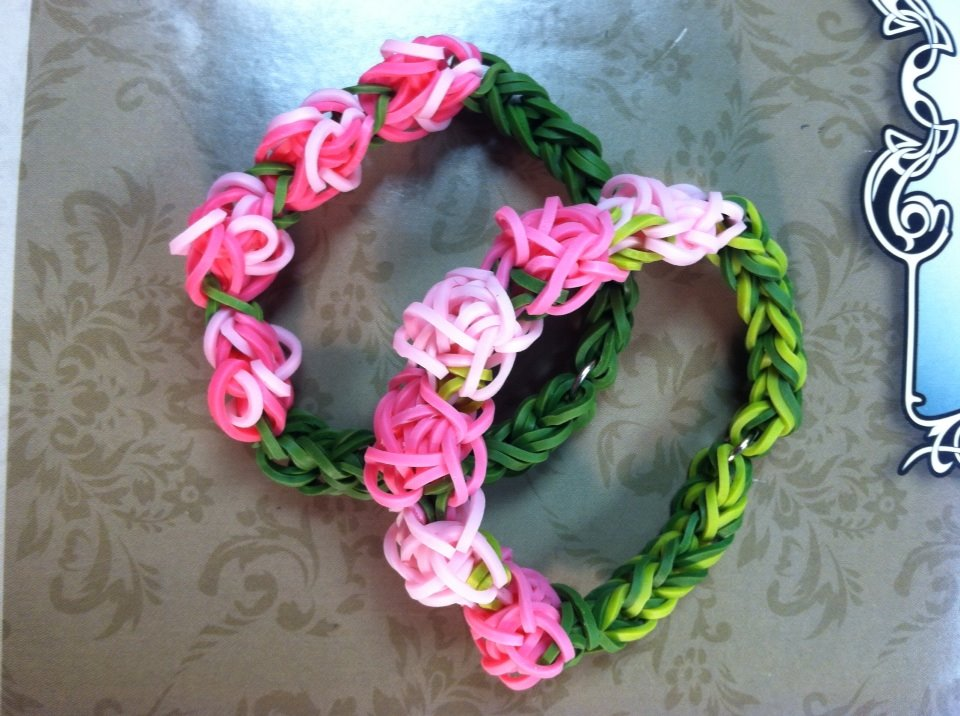
Rose Bud Bracelets

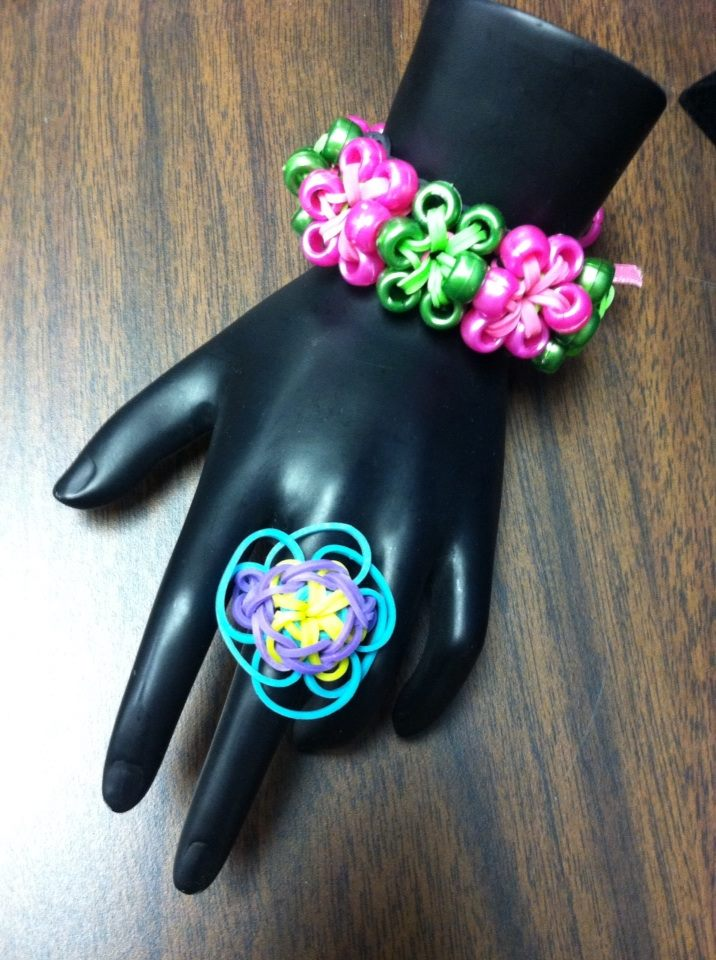
Beaded Bracelet & Ring
