= Learning Express Toys =

American specialty toy, game and book retailer

Learning Express, Inc.
- Logo used since 2005
- Trade name: Learning Express Toys & Gifts (2005-Present); Learning Express (1987-2005)
- Company type: Private
- Industry: Retail
- Founded: 1987; 39 years ago in Acton, MA, U.S.
- Founder: Sharon DiMinico
- Headquarters: Devens, Massachusetts, U.S.
- Area served: United States
- Key people: Lauren Derse (CEO); Kathy Troknya (President)
- Products: Toys; Games; Books
- Website: learningexpress.com

Learning Express Toys & Gifts, incorporated in 1987 as Learning Express, Inc., is a specialty toy, game and book retailer and franchisor headquartered in Devens, Massachusetts, United States. The company franchises specialty toy stores in the United States, each locally owned and operated.

== History ==
Sharon DiMinico, chair of the Board of Directors and parent of two children at Groton Community School, proposed a business plan in 1987 for the school to open a specialty toy store in order to prevent tuition increases. Later that spring, the school opened the first Learning Express in Acton, Massachusetts, and, six months later, Sharon opened the first store owned by Learning Express, Inc. in Needham, Massachusetts. Inspired by an article about franchising in Inc. Magazine, Sharon licensed the company's first franchise location in Andover, Massachusetts in 1990.

== Stores ==
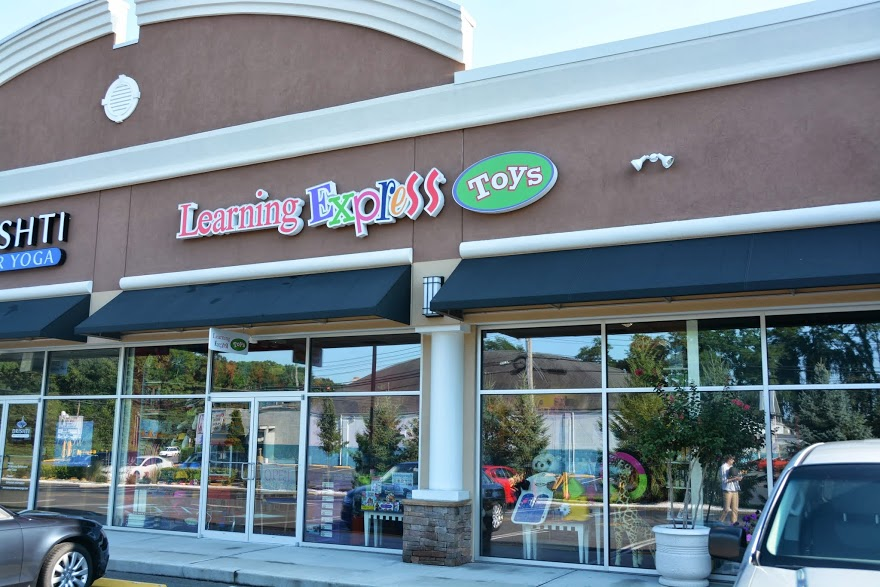
Typical Learning Express Toys storefront

Most Learning Express Toys locations are in strip centers, regional malls, lifestyle centers, and town centers. They range in size from around 1,200 square feet to 4,000 square feet, though 2,500 square feet is a typical size.

== Convention ==
Since 1999, Learning Express Toys has produced an annual convention for its store owners, vendors, and other members of the toy industry. The event is held in various locations in the United States. The final evening is generally reserved for an Awards Banquet, where members of the community give and receive honors for their contributions to the Learning Express Toys community. Notable vendor awards include "Vendor of the Year" and "Toy of the Year."

== Catalog ==
Learning Express Toys produces several print catalogs each year and two during the critical toy industry holiday season during November and December. The holiday catalog is distributed to customers nationwide. Individual store owners use the catalog as a guide for toy purchases throughout the year.
