= Swift training rifle =

British rifle of the Second World War

The Swift Training Rifle was a rifle shooting training device made in Great Britain during the Second World War. This rifle did not actually fire a cartridge, but shot out a forked probe that punctured a paper target barely an inch from the "muzzle". The system illustrated, to a recruit or trainee, the required sight picture and the correct hold of the rifle as well as the correct operation of the action, the finesse of trigger pull, and the importance of prevention of cant of the rifle.

The device, in a transit case and with its associated target frame and targets, was sold mainly to the Royal Air Force to train recruits; whilst the army treated the system with a degree of unjustified, but perhaps typical, disdain. There were two main models of Swift training rifle made available over a period of about three war years. These were the A and B series, which were each loosely based on the Lee–Enfield No.3 rifle (P14 in .303" calibre and M1917 in .30-06 calibre) and there was the later Mark IV Rifle which was more closely modelled on the British Lee–Enfield No.4 rifle. A similar training rifle was manufactured in Canada at the Long Branch factory. It is arguable whether the latter was a better training rifle, but it was a far cheaper production item at a time when funds were needed to produce the real weapons for which these training rifles were simply economical teaching aids.

The Swift Training Rifle came with a stand that folded out in "Deck Chair" fashion, and onto which was clipped the paper target. The rifle was held at a constant distance from the target by a steel rod bridle hinged from the target frame and hooked into a sling-swivel-like fitting under the rifle's fore-end woodwork. The targets were printed in a series of four different images, each illustrating a particular training scenario.

== See also ==
- Drill purpose rifle
- Dry fire
- Gun camera
- Laser pistol (sport)
- Modelguns
- Rubber duck (military)
