= Drill purpose rifle =

Deactivated rifle used for training

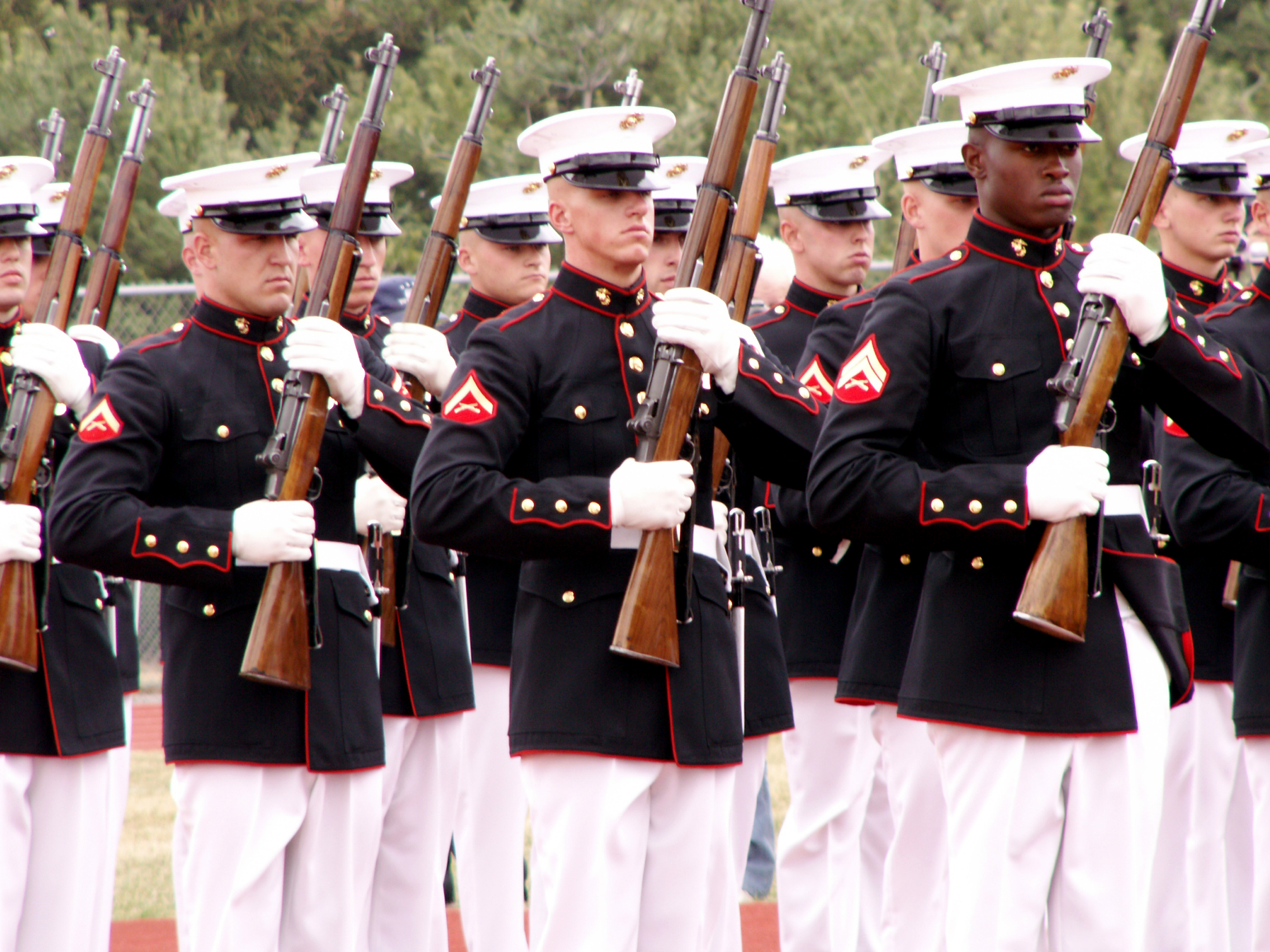
United States Marine Corps's Silent Drill Platoon, drilling with inert M1 Garand rifles

A drill purpose rifle (also known as a parade rifle) is a rifle which has been altered so that it can no longer be fired. This is generally undertaken by either removing the firing pin or peening a nail into the bolt hole. These rifles are used solely for drill purposes, training and teaching, usually by cadet forces. These rifles can be marched with and can also be used to perform exhibition style individual or group maneuvers.

Within a British context at least, machine and submachine guns have also received drill purpose conversions.

== Australia ==
Australian Defence Force Cadets use replica or inert L1A1 SLRs, F88I Austeyrs or .303 SMLE (Short, Magazine Lee-Enfield).

== Canada ==
In the Canadian Cadet Organizations, cadets use decommissioned Lee-Enfields, chambered in either .22 or .303, as drill purpose rifles, labelled with a white band around the muzzle and the butt of the rifle with the letters DP stamped on the stock. The bolt is also removed and destroyed.

== China ==
In China, a drill-version of the Type 56-I, incapable of firing, is used for ceremonial purposes such as parades.

== United Kingdom ==
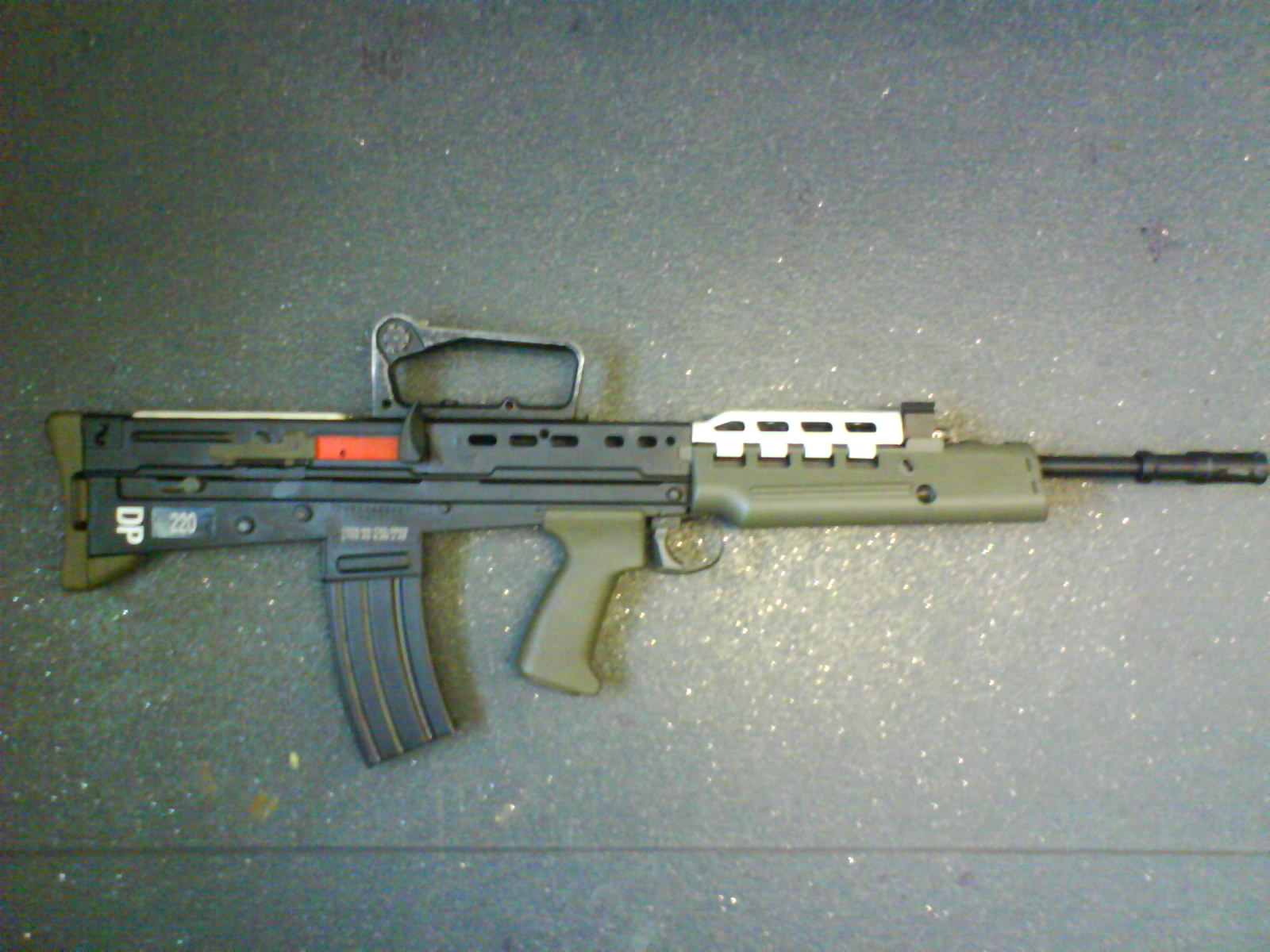
The L103A2 - a drill purpose version of the L98A2

In the United Kingdom an example of a drill purpose rifle was the L59A1 Drill Rifle, which was used mainly by the Army Cadet Force. The rifles are clearly labelled with a white band around the stock and the butt of the rifle with the letters DP written in bold black script. In addition, it may be stamped 'DP' above the serial number on the receiver. The rifle was used as a teaching aide. A drill purpose version of the L98A2 Cadet GP Rifle is available, the L103 Cadet Drill Purpose rifle. This rifle cannot be fired. It is only used by cadets for practicing rifle drill and dry weapons training. They are easily identified, as they have white top covers as opposed to the normal green and red bolt carrier assemblies as opposed to the usual plain metal. Some may have their front sight removed, some might not. They can still be fully stripped as the only change not mentioned above is the blocking of the barrel, so can be used for weapons training, weapon handling tests, and fieldcraft (without firing of blanks).

== United States ==
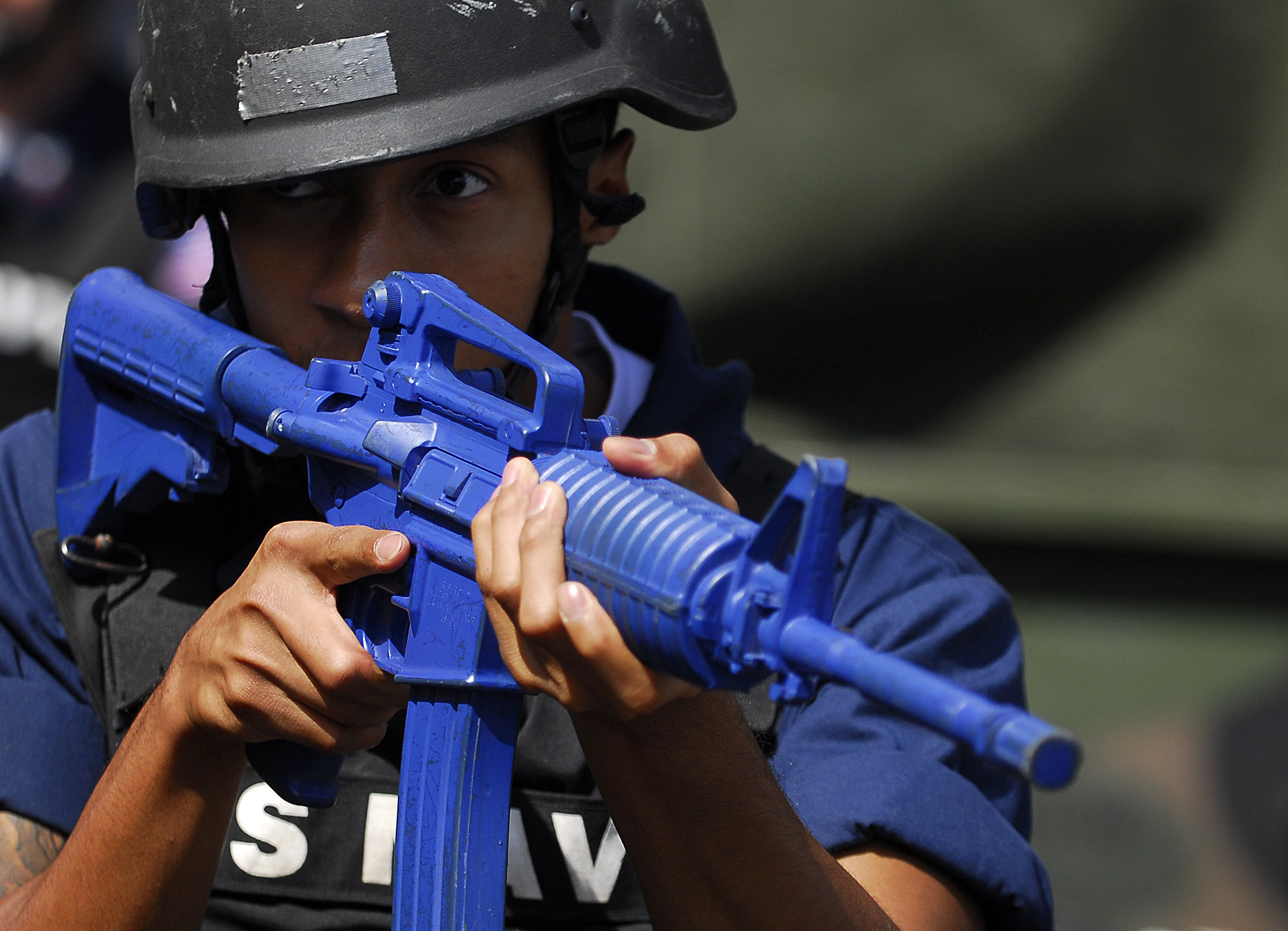
A U.S. Navy sailor training with a drill purpose rifle, colored blue to be easily distinguished as fake.

In the United States of America, active-duty military groups have for many decades raised the profile of drill purpose rifles. These groups are hosted by all five services, with the most well-known being the United States Marine Corps Silent Drill Platoon and the U.S. Army Old Guard Drill team. However, the rifles in use by these two groups actually can fire if loaded. New Guard America, the Hawaiian Village King's Guard Drill Team, and the Hawaii Royal Honor Guard are the most well-known private, non-military groups involving in using drill purpose rifles.

At the college level the Pershing Rifles is a national military oriented fraternity that focuses on rifle drills, mostly using the M1903 Springfield or M1 Garand.

Along with the performing groups listed above, military contractor Sports Network International, Inc. (SNI) hosts military drill competitions annually which bring together roughly 10,000 young high school drillers representing all four Junior ROTC service branches. Hosting these events for three of the four service headquarters, the largest of these remains the all-service National High School Drill Team Championships. This event, annually hosted in Daytona Beach, Florida in early May, brings together over 4,000 individuals performing drill & ceremony, the majority using drill purpose rifles. In addition to the many drill events hosted by SNI, they produce an annual international magazine entitled DrillNATION viewed by over 2,500 JROTC units globally, host military drill camps where drill purpose rifles are used and proper drill execution is taught, while also filming and providing the Best of the Nationals Video Series since 1989.

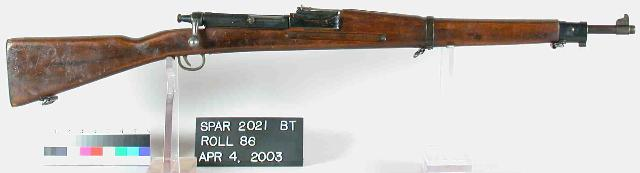
Parris-Dunn U.S. Training Rifle Mk1 Navy

The most popular weapons used in America are replicas of the M1903A3 Springfield, M1 Garand, and the M14.

Currently, there are three main weapons designed exclusively for military exhibition drill. These are the DrillAmerica replica M-1 rifle offered by Glendale Inc; the Parris Manufacturing Company and Daisy replica M1903A3 Springfield drill rifle, created at the request of the United States Navy; and the Mark-1 facsimile rifle, a light-weight replica weapon modeled after an M1903A3 with pistol grip stock.

== See also ==
- Cadet rifle
- Modelguns
- Rubber duck (military)
- Swift training rifle
