= Rubber duck (military) =

Training Equipment

U.S. Navy sailor training with an M16 "Red Gun"

In the United States military, a rubber duck, "rubber ducky", "Blue Gun", or "Red Gun" is a non-functional training weapon that is fully or partially made of rubber or plastic. They usually resemble M16 rifles or M4 carbines and are commonly used in basic training. Trainees are issued rubber ducks to add realism to training without the dangers and maintenance inherent to real firearms. Some JROTC units also use rubber ducks during physical training.

For example, rubber ducks are sometimes issued to troops before they have been properly trained to use actual rifles to become familiar with basic care, and responsible handling. Other times rubber ducks are issued as a time saver, where proper long-term care of a real firearm would distract from the main training focus, such as tactical combat casualty care training, or land navigation. Rubber ducks are also used where there is a disconnect between safety in the field versus in garrison. During bayonet drills, discharging a weapon against an opponent is to be avoided, whereas in the field discharging the weapon during a bayonet fight is often the goal. Additionally, in various ceremonial practices using a rifle capable of firing would serve no purpose.

Some rubber ducks are made by filling and coating an actual decommissioned M16 rifle with rubber or plastic. Some are also made using decommissioned rifle parts, with rubber or plastic used for the other parts. Still others are made entirely of rubber or plastic that has been molded to resemble both the exact shape and weight of a rifle.

Rubber duck use is being phased out in some areas of the US Armed Forces, namely in Air Force Basic Training. They were replaced with M16 replica drill purpose rifle: metal models that resemble M16 rifles, including most internal parts, but that lack the ability to fire. The replicas allow soldiers to learn disassembly and reassembly of their rifles much earlier in their training.

== Gallery ==
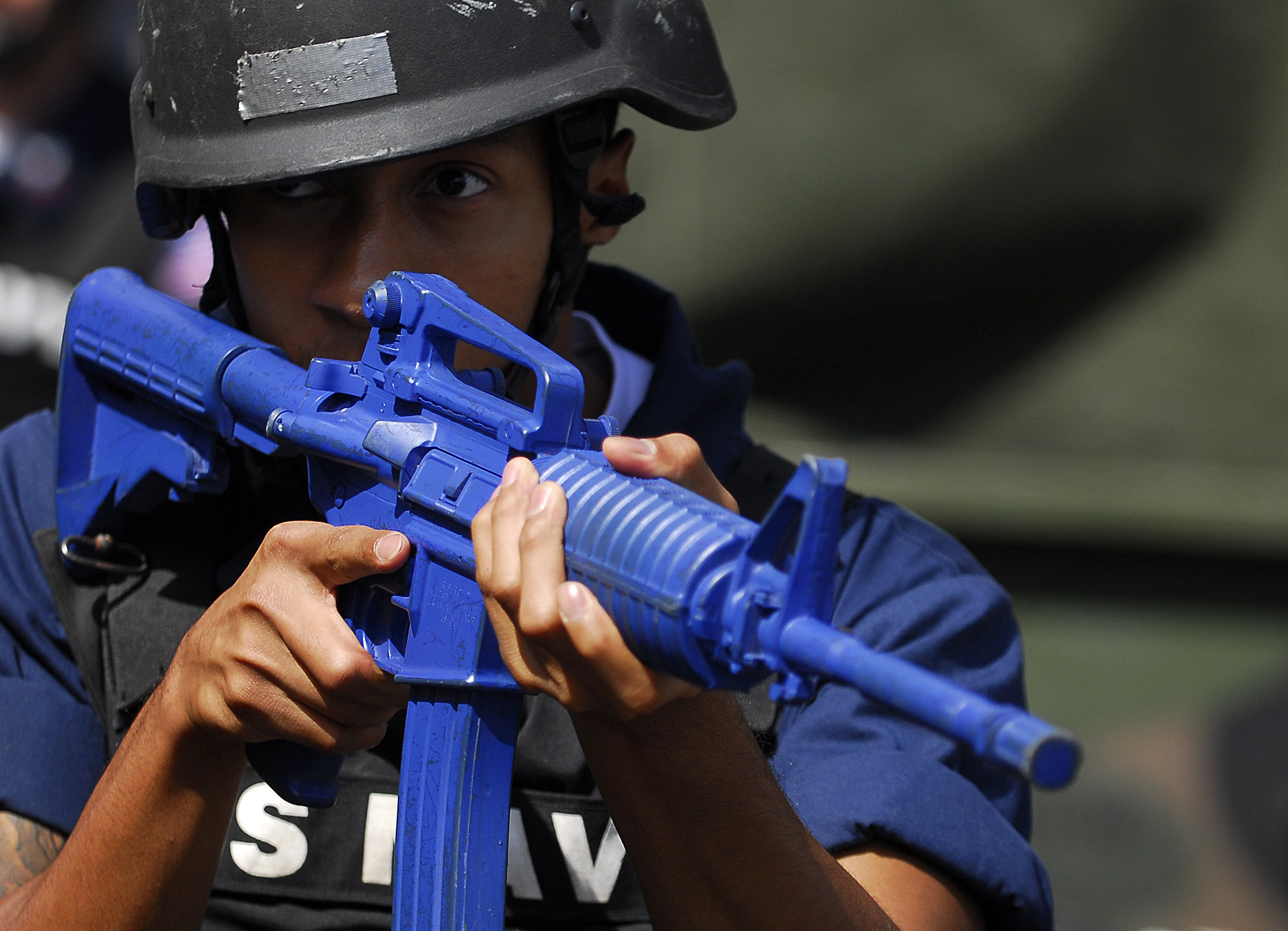
U.S. Navy sailor training with an M4 "Blue Gun"

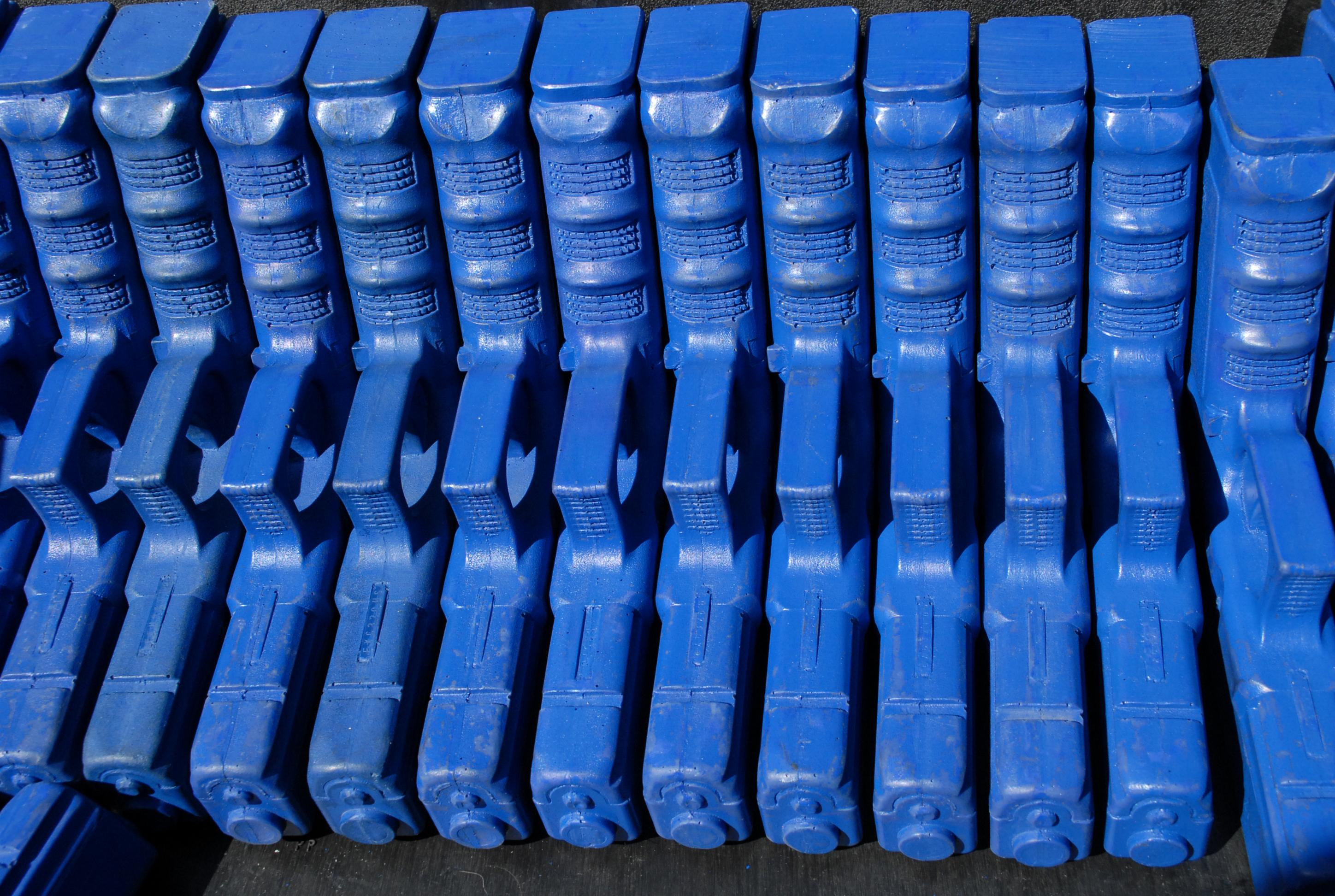
Glock training pistols

== See also ==
- Dummy round
- Military dummy
- Modelguns
