= Cap gun =

Toy gun using percussion caps to simulate gunshots and smoke

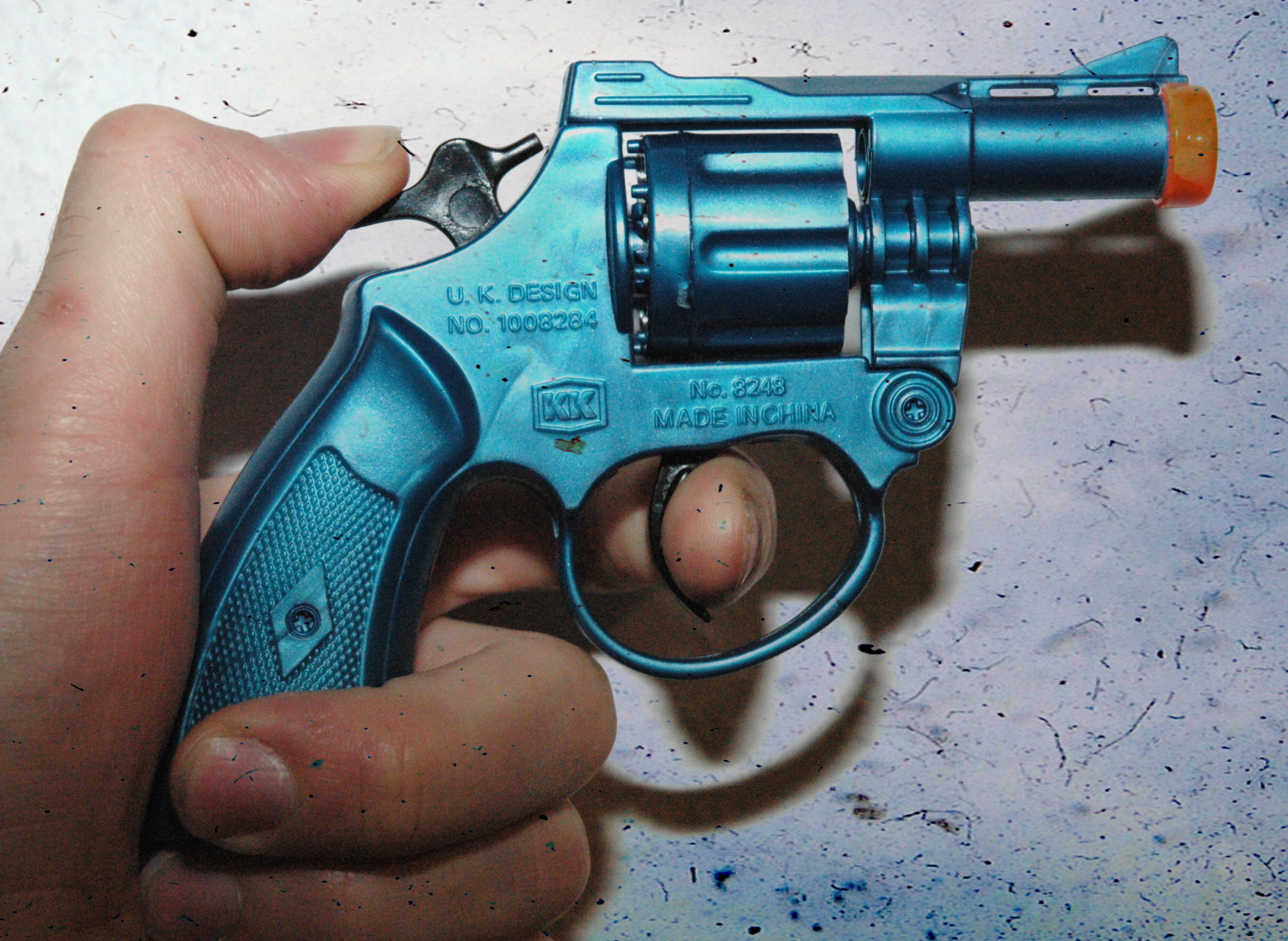
An orange-tipped cap gun with its hammer drawn back

A cap gun, cap pistol, or cap rifle is a toy gun that creates a loud sound simulating a gunshot and smoke when a small percussion cap is ignited by a hammer hitting the gunpowder. Cap guns were originally made of cast iron, but after World War II were made of zinc alloy, and most newer models are made of plastic. Cap guns get their name from the small discs of shock-sensitive explosive compounds (roughly 1.4 to 1.6 millimetres (0.055 to 0.063 in) in diameter) that provide the noise and smoke, effectively the same as the Maynard tape primer and percussion caps used in real firearms of the mid to late 1800s but usually smaller and made from cheap plastic or paper. Some are arranged in plastic rings of eight or twelve. There are also single caps, roll caps (of 50 to 500), disk caps, and cap strips all of which are actually extremely small versions of percussion fireworks. Armstrong's mixture is often used today as the explosive, but previously the tiny powder charge was a simple mixture of potassium perchlorate, sulfur, and antimony sulfide sandwiched between two paper layers that hold in the gases long enough to give a sound report when the cap is struck.

== History ==
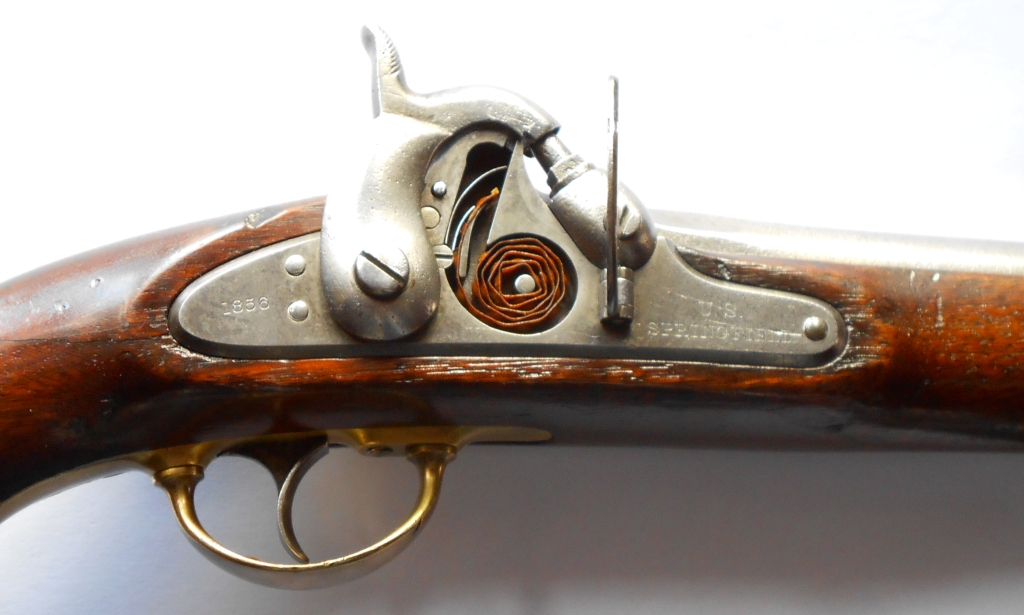
Springfield musket with tape primer

Real guns that used caps first appeared around the United States Civil War era, when faster firing weapons were needed. The Springfield Model 1855 musket was fitted with a Maynard tape primer. A roll of paper impregnated with fulminate served as the detonator, but it was found to be impractical in wet or muddy conditions and the Union army reverted to using the conventional copper percussion cap. After the demand for caps declined, firearms companies experimented with toy cap guns modeled after real percussion cap guns.

Cap guns became especially popular when the heroes of cinema and television rode through the West, ridding the territories of villains. Many cap guns were named after or endorsed by leading matinee idols like Roy Rogers, Gene Autry, Hopalong Cassidy, The Lone Ranger, Tonto, Dale Evans, and Marshal Matt Dillon.

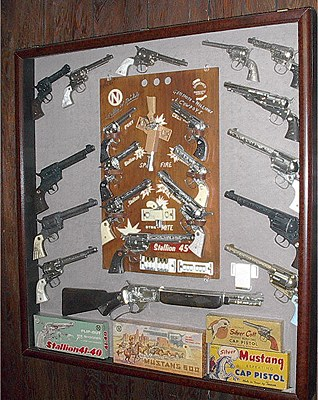
A display of Nichols Industries cap guns. Some collectors collect all brands.

The "Golden Age" of cap guns was roughly a 20-year period following World War II when television became popular and such companies as Nichols, Hubley, Kenton, Kilgore, Wyandotte, Classy, Mattel, Actoy, Esquire, George Schmidt, and J & E Stevens in the US and companies like Lone Star Toys in the UK made millions of cap guns in various versions. While many had their names patterned after a hero or heroine, many cap guns were also named with western-sounding names, like: "Stallion 45", "Pony", "Mustang", "Pioneer", "Cowboy", "Texan", "Colt 45" and "Rodeo".

Children all over the world emulated their heroes by collecting and playing with these toy guns. However, when the Western television shows began to fade away and the heroes retired, the cap gun continued to be produced in military and secret agent modes until the popularity of the tie-in toy guns also diminished, and eventually all of the famous cap gun manufacturers either sold out to other toy companies or started manufacturing other types of toys.

There were many types of cap guns, including guns from small Derringers to larger rifles, and even working miniatures of most of them. One of the last famous ones to sell widely was a toy rifle named after the television show, The Rifleman, which aired from 1958 through early 1963. Other shows lasted longer, such as Gunsmoke (which had 20 seasons lasting through 1975), but these did not have as much 'kid-appeal' as the earlier shows, and the sales of toy cap guns began to decline.

The pistols were generally offered in three styles: the semi-automatic, the revolver (which actually had a revolving cylinder carrying a disk of caps), and the mock-revolver which looked like a regular revolver, but opened to load a roll of caps. Almost all of the early models used either roll caps or circular disks of caps, but in 1950 Nichols Industries came out with a large model called the Stallion 45, which had a revolving cylinder into which individual bullets were loaded, which each had two parts. The circular cap was placed into the two-piece bullet and then when the gun was loaded and fired, it seemed more realistic. Eventually several companies used this idea and a few years later Nichols invented a plastic bullet that was snapped into a hollowed-out version of the regular two-piece bullet with a compression spring inside. When the gun was fired, the spring pressure "shot" the plastic pellet out of the end of the barrel. Eventually Mattel also came out with a similar model called "Shootin' Shells."

Mattel produced an automatic firing cap weapon styled after the Thompson submachine gun. Pulling back on a slide, which simulated the charging handle of the real Thompson, prepared the gun for firing by tensioning a spring. When the trigger was pulled the spring power would drive the mechanism, firing a series of up to ten caps from a sprocket-fed roll. It was made initially for a Dick Tracy line of toys, then camouflaged for a Green Beret Guerilla Fighter line of weapons, then restyled again as a tie-in with the Planet of the Apes franchise.

== Types of caps ==
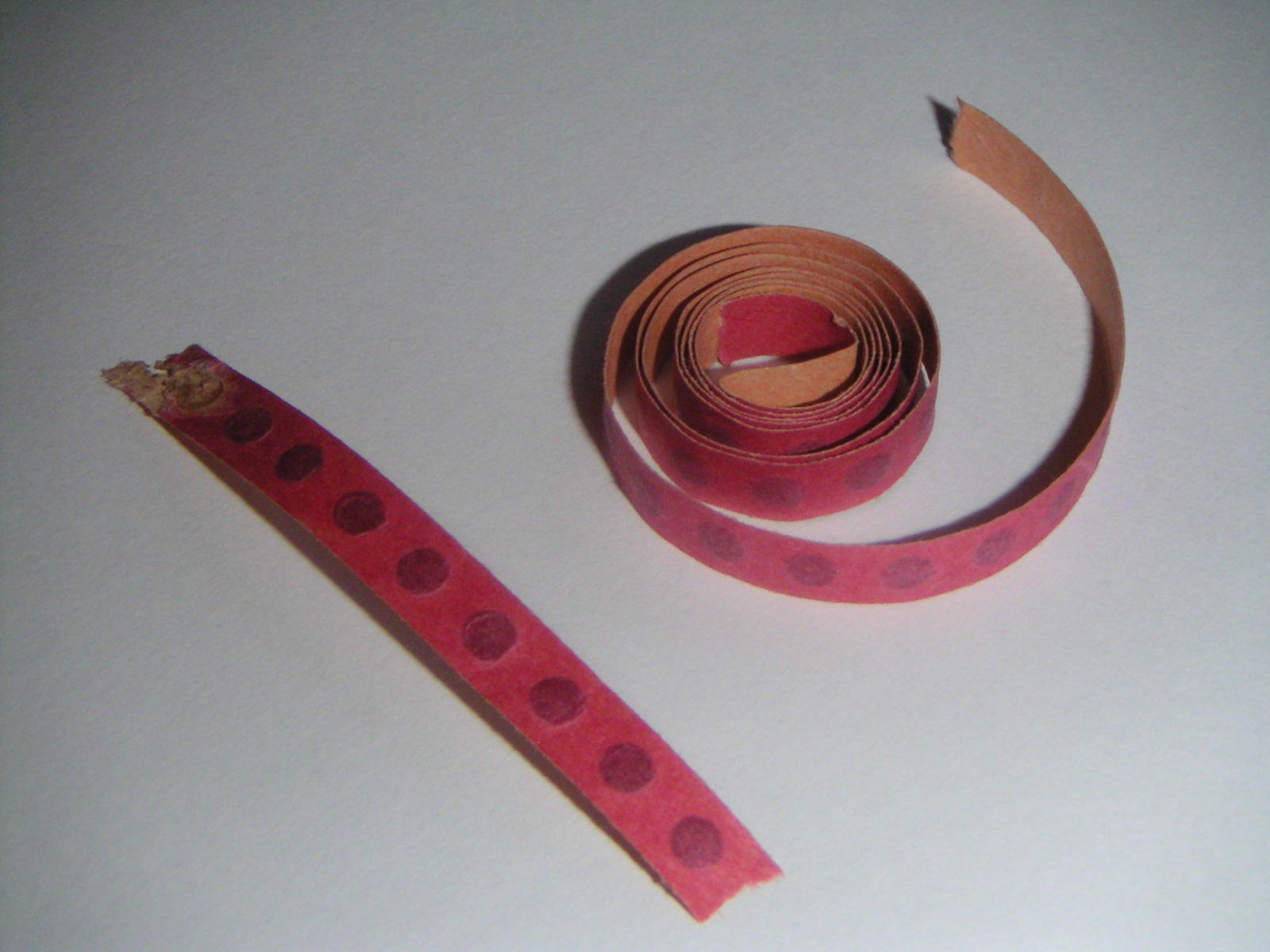
Paper caps

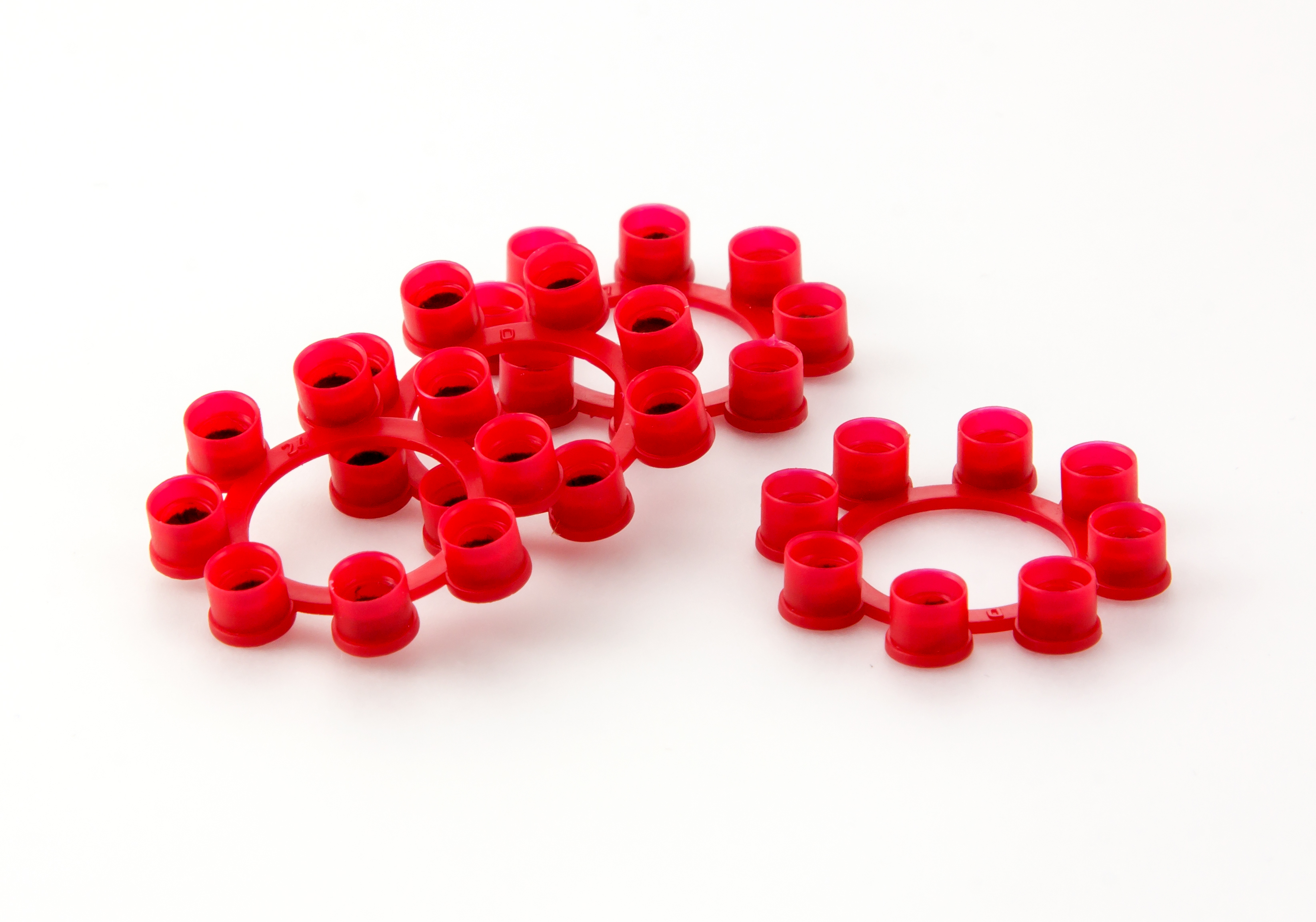
Plastic ring ammunition

- Roll caps, perforated roll caps: often sold in sets of five rolls of 50 red paper caps per roll.
- Greenie Stick-M-Caps: Green peel-and-stick paper caps manufactured by the Mattel company to stick on the back of their "Shootin' Shells"
- Plastic, red circular discs used today. Containing gunpowder and a zinc alloy used to create a smaller explosion than would be previously reached with pure gunpowder components in the 1950s
- Plastic strips, similar to disks, but arranged in a line, often with means of attaching singular strips to one another

== Types of cap guns ==
Ring cap guns are usually modeled after revolver pistols, with the cap ring placed in the cylinder section of the toy gun. Like its real-world counterpart, when the trigger is pulled, the cylinder rotates a new cap into place, the hammer is drawn back, and then released; the shock causes the cap to explode harmlessly, producing the noise and smoke.

Strip or paper cap guns use the aforementioned cap strip in lieu of the cap ring. As in the ring style of gun, each pull of the trigger advances the cap strip forward, pulls back the hammer to the point where it releases, striking the cap.

Potato or spud guns occasionally use a cap to provide a burst of gas to fire the projectile, a small cutting of potato. One design employs a small reusable metal "cartridge" which has a recess for a cap at one end and a small drilling through to the other end, which holds the potato. Due to the low energy contained in a paper cap and the poor seal around the cartridge, these spud guns usually have very modest range, barely enough to eject the potato cutting.

Plug fire cap guns are almost exclusively from Japan and are more realistic in action often used by reenactors. They also fall under the category of modelguns.

Mattel introduced a modified type of roll cap that used sprocket feed instead of simple friction feed.

== Legal requirements ==
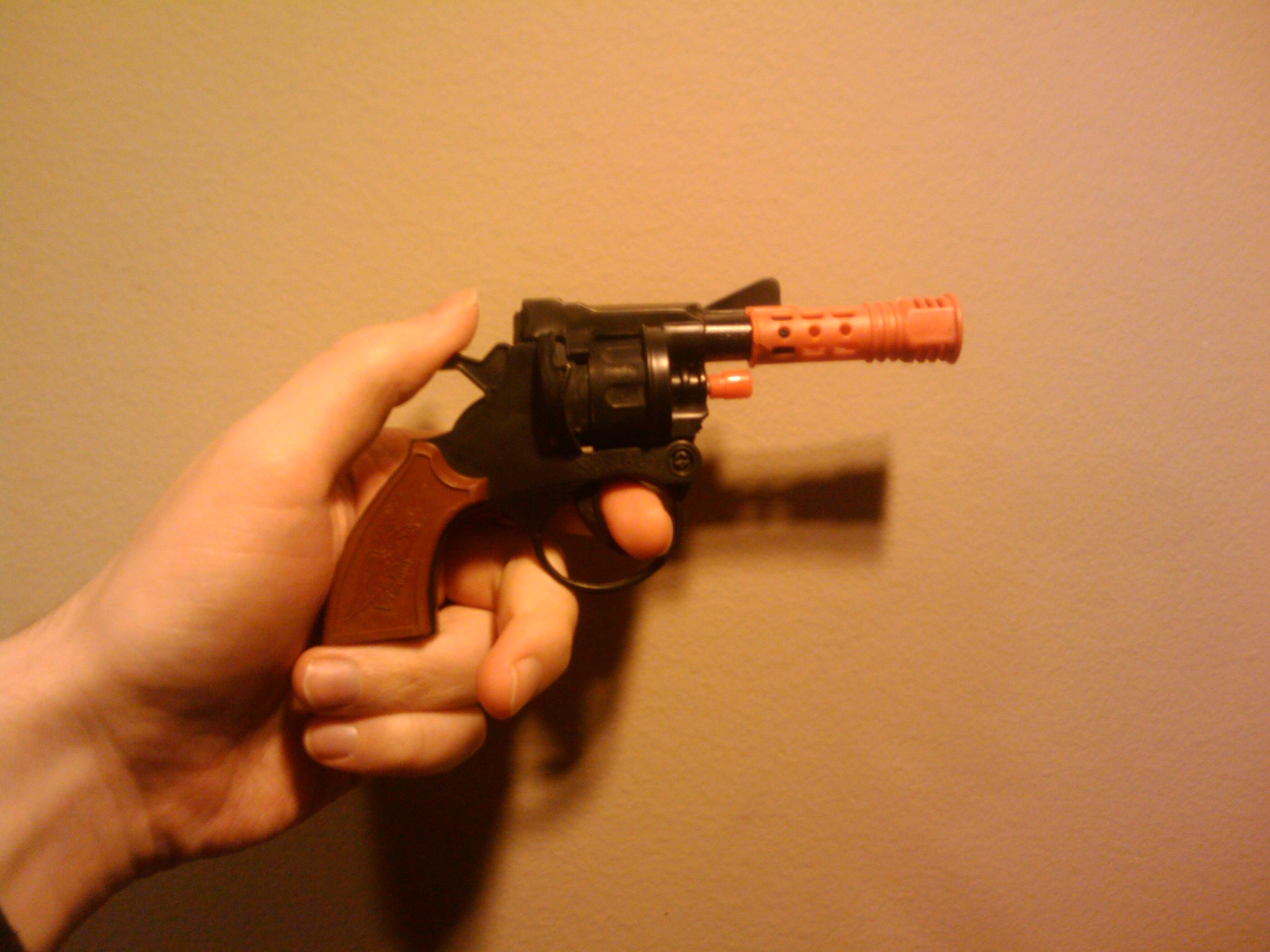
A modern cap gun, its barrel made from bright orange plastic to prevent it being mistaken for a real gun

Beginning in 1988, cap guns and other toy guns in the United States must be manufactured with a bright orange, red, or yellow tip placed over the "muzzle" of the cap gun, or with the entire gun made in these or other bright colours. Laws requiring these markings were made because of incidents where children and teenagers were killed by police officers who mistook cap guns for real guns. While these incidents were rare, lawmakers decided that toy guns must be marked so they cannot be mistaken for real guns.

== Other uses ==
Caps have occasionally been used in toys other than cap guns where an explosive effect is desired. One example would be the "Thunder Punch" version of the He-Man action figure from the original 1980s Masters of the Universe toy line. Ring caps were placed in a "backpack" integrated into the figure, which contained the striking mechanism for the caps (as well as tiny vents to allow smoke from a triggered cap to escape). This mechanism was triggered by drawing the figure's spring-loaded right arm back and releasing it to swing forward; the explosion of the cap was intended to simulate a thunderous noise caused by the superhuman power of the character's punch. Similar cap firing mechanisms for toy soldiers were produced in Germany for the Elastolin and Lineol toy soldiers and artillery pieces.

A relatively new type of Airsoft, known as hybrid guns, use small round BBs in the tip of a casing, usually designed to mimic that of its respective magazine. Caps are placed behind the casing. In electric models, the caps are burst, and the pressure is used to propel the BB forward in a manner similar to real firearms. The leftover energy is then sometimes put to use simulating recoil and a blowback system that ejects the casings.

Caps are used in toy flare guns. The cap propels one or two pyrotechnic star loads in flares.

"Cap bombs" are devices roughly in the shape of an aerial bomb that contain a firing mechanism in the nose capable of holding a single cap, either plastic or paper (cut from a strip), though types are not interchangeable due to the mutually exclusive design. With the newer designs they have both the paper cap or plastic cap. When dropped on a hard surface, the impact detonates the cap.

"Exploding pens" are devices that look like ink pens but these contain an anvil where the explosive cap is placed, then a spring-loaded lever is pulled back and held in place by the cap of the pen. The pen is then ready to leave around or given to another person as a practical joke. When an unsuspecting person pulls the cap of the pen off, the spring drives the lever against the explosive cap for a surprise bang.

Tri-ang Railways in the UK utilised caps in some of their OO gauge range of model rolling stock and accessories for toy play effect in the 1960s such as an exploding box car, a detonating rocket on their carrier transporter and an exploding fog signal accessory to mimic the effect of track detonators.

== See also ==
- Air gun
- Airsoft gun
- BB gun
- Modelguns (Japan)
- Paintball gun
- Toy gun

== External resources ==
- Skooldays Discusses why cap guns might have first been manufactured.
