= Western Arms =

Western Arms (commonly shortened to "WA") is an airsoft gun manufacturer. They primarily manufacture 1911 and 2011 variants, though they do make several Beretta 92 types and have made other types of pistols. Recently, they have added three types of GBB M4 carbine rifles to their lineup of gas powered replicas. Currently, they only produce gas powered blowback replicas, though they have made gas-electric hybrids in the past.

Western Arms' guns generally cost more than other Japanese airsoft manufacturers' GBBs, such as Tokyo Marui.

== Western Arms Airsoft Gas Blowback List ==
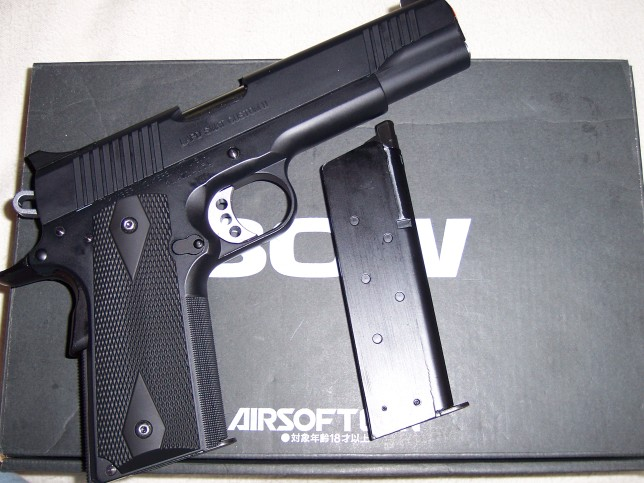
The Western Arms SCW Version III SWAT Custom II with box.

=== SCW Version III ===
  - Series 70 SCW HOAG National Match DX 6inch
  - Series 70 Bob Chow Special Version II(HW)
  - Series 70 Bob Chow Special with Compensator (HW)
  - Bob Chow Special II (HW)
  - Colt 1911 Gunsite HW (Black)
  - Colt 1911 Gunsite HW (Silver)
  - SW1911PD Gunsite HW (Silver)
  - SW1911PD Gunsite HW (Black)
  - Strayer-Voigt Infinity 5.0 Limited HW (Silver)
  - Strayer-Voigt Infinity 5.0 Limited HW (Black)
  - Strayer-Voigt Infinity 4.3 Limited HW (Silver)
  - Strayer-Voigt Infinity 4.3 Limited HW (Black)
  - Beretta M8045 Cougar F HW (Silver)
  - Night Hawk Custom Vickers Tactical
  - Beretta M8045 Cougar F HW (Black)
  - Strayer-Voigt Infinity Expert All Black HW Slide (Black)
  - Strayer-Voigt Infinity Expert All Silver HW Slide (Silver)
  - Strayer-Voigt Infinity Classic All Black HW Slide (Black)
  - Strayer-Voigt Infinity Classic Hybrid Silver HW Slide (Silver)[Discontinued]
  - Warrior OD HW
  - Desert Warrior HW
  - Warrior HW
  - Stainless TLE II (Silver)
  - LAPD SWAT Custom II
  - Para Ordnance H.R.T. (Matte Black)
  - Para Ordnance H.R.T. (Parkerized)
  - Colt Government Mark IV Series 80 (CQB)
  - Remix Detective Special (Two-Tone)
  - Colt Government Wilson Combat Super Grade
  - 2006 Remix Gilded V12
  - Colt Government Mark IV Series 80 Officer
  - Colt Bob Chow Special (Limited Edition)
  - M1911A1 Commercial Military
  - Colt Government Mark IV Series 80
  - SIGARMS GSR (2 Tone)
  - SIGARMS GSR (Black)
  - SW1911 SC
  - SW1911 PD
  - Colt Government M1911A1 Military
  - Colt Government Mark IV Series 70

=== SCW Version II ===
  - LAPD SWAT Custom II [Discontinued]
  - Wild Heart (Limited Edition) [Discontinued]
  - S&W M4013 TSW HW (Black)
  - S&W M4013 TSW HW (Silver)
  - Para-Ordnance P14-45 Limited
  - Smith&Wesson SW1911 (Silver)
  - V10 Ultra Compact (Limited Edition)
  - Wilson Combat SDS HW -(Black)
  - SW1911(HW)
  - Colt Government MarkIV Series 80
  - Combat FBI Trial Pistol [Discontinued]
  - TLE / RL II (Black / Silver)
  - TLE / RL II Silver
  - TLE / RL II Black
  - Strayer-Voigt Infinity Expert pistol 4.3 inch
  - Strayer-Voigt Infinity Expert pistol 5 inch [Discontinued]
  - Strayer-Voigt Infinity Expert Pistol 6 inch [Discontinued]
  - GOV'T CQB Hi-Spec (Two Tone HW)
  - Wild Hawk - Black (HW, Limited Edition) [Discontinued]
  - Para-Ordnance H.R.T. Special
  - Mark IV Series 70

=== SCW Version I ===
  - SIGARMS GSR Revolution HW (Silver)
  - SIGARMS GSR Revolution HW (Black)
  - Gold Match HW (Silver)
  - Wilson Super Grade 5 inch Deluxe HW
  - 2006 Remix Detective Special (Silver)
  - Mil-spec 1911-A1 CAL.45 (Silver)
  - Railed Shorty .45 (Silver)
  - Railed Shorty .45 (Black)
  - Stainless TLE II HW Silver
  - MARSOC Marine Special Operations Command
  - M8045 Cougar F (HW)
  - MEU 1911A1 (HW)
  - Auto 10mm Delta Elite (Silver) [Discontinued]
  - M1911A1 U.S.Army
  - Combat Commander MarkIV series 80 Premium Edition
  - U.S. M1911A1 Military
  - Colt - Bob Chow Special (Limited Edition)
  - Colt MK IV Series 90 Defender (Limited Edition)
- M84FS
  - M84FS Silencer Model
  - M84FS Standard
  - M84FS SpyPack
- M1934
  - M1934 Silver Frame
  - M1934
  - M1934 Mil-Spec Model
  - M1934 Silencer Model Limited Edition (HW)
  - M1934 Strike Witches Francesca Lucchini Edition
- M92FS
  - M92FS Competition Deluxe
  - M92FS Competition Standard
  - M92FS Elite II (Two Tone)
- M1911s
  - HI-Capacity.45 CQB Special
  - Mag Tech Colt Gov. M1911A1 with Silencer
  - Mag Tech Colt Gov. M1911A1 (Parkerized)
  - Commander Light Weight (2003 Version)
  - Wilson Combat Super Grade II
- SMGs
  - Mac11
  - Mini Uzi
  - Jati-Matic
- Berettas
  - M9A1 Perfect Version HW (Black)
  - M9A1 Desert HW
  - M9A1 OD HW
  - M92FS/DX Ivory Polymer Grip
  - M92FS/DX Black Pearl Grip [Discontinued]
  - M92FS/DX White Pearl Grip
  - U.S. 9mm M9 Mil-Spec (HW)
  - U.S. 9mm M9 (Black HW)
  - M92FS Elite IA (Silver)
  - M92FS Elite IA
  - M92FS Premium Edition Perfect (Black)
  - M92FS Original Perfect
  - M92FS Centurion
  - M92FS INOX Nickel Plated
  - M8045 Cougar F (Two Tone)
  - M92FS New Carbon HW (Black)

=== Magna Series ===
  - Infinity Limited 6in
  - Infinity Limited 5in
  - Xcelerator Compact
  - Xcelerator Fluted 5in
  - Xcelerator 5in
  - Xcelerator Hybrid 6in
  - Xcelerator 6in
  - Gigant silver
  - Gigant black
  - Tactical Special
  - M4A1 CQB-R
  - M4A1 CARBINE
