= Modelguns =

Japanese replica guns

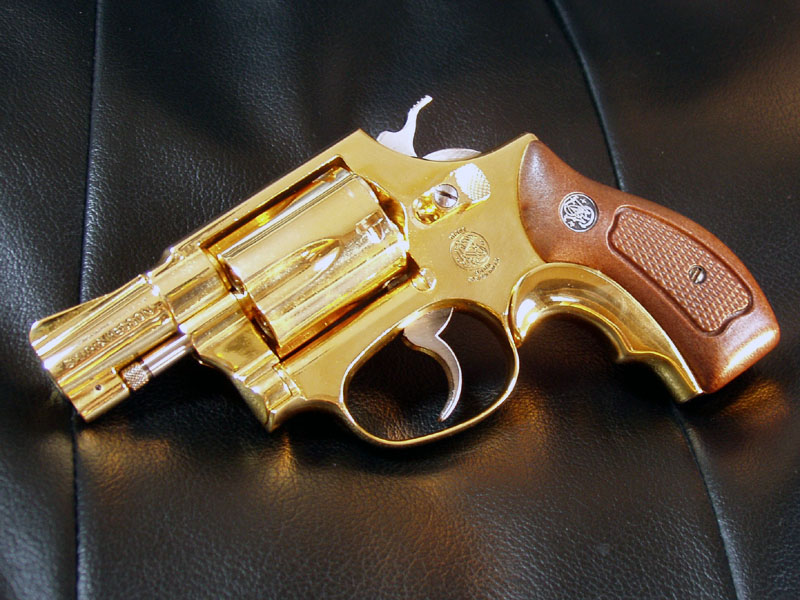
A Japanese Modelgun in regulation yellow/gold.

Modelguns (モデルガン) are Japanese replica or toy guns which are usually made of zinc alloys or plastic materials. Most modelguns commonly available today are designed to highly replicate the physical appearance (some bear the authentic trademarks and markings too) and in full scale of the real gun counterpart. Many are even made to highly replicate the internal mechanisms so that they are able to strip-down exactly and imitate closely the functionalities of the real counterparts. They operate exactly like a cap gun, using a small plastic percussion cap to produce gunfire sound, spark and blowback operation (for automatic models), but strictly not able to shoot any projectile.

In Japan, there are strict gun control laws in place to restrict the mechanisms and the material of modelguns so that the replicas appearing in the Japanese market are safe and cannot be modified to allow for shooting of live cartridges or projectiles. Their high resemblance to real guns and complete safeness make them attractive to many gun enthusiasts, especially in other countries with strict gun control. Modelguns cost only a fraction of the their real equivalents, and some even replicate the rare out-of-reach original models. Modelguns are legal to own in many countries and don't require a license for ownership.

Aside from private collection by hobbyists, modelguns are often used in movie productions, re-enactments, authority training and museum displays. While airsoft guns look nearly identical to actual guns, their internal design is very different from them, and as such are not generally considered a type of modelgun.

== History ==
Modelguns were developed after the Second World War due to tight restrictions on firearm ownership by civilians in Japan. As a result, toy guns became popular with many Japanese gun enthusiasts. The early toy guns were imported cap guns (mainly Mattel, Hubley and Nichols) from the United States from late 1950s. Some of the agencies or shops notably Japan Model Gun Collection Association (later MGC), Nakata store, Ehara store (later Tokyo CMC), International Gun Club (later International Industry (Kokusai)) importing or retailing the cap guns later transformed to key modelgun makers and played a key role in modelgun history. These cap guns were fairly crude approximations of actual firearms and with very few operational features. Strictly speaking they are not classified as modelguns as their design / markings and even size is very different from the real counterparts. Nevertheless, these imported cap guns formed the foundation for further modelgun development and gave designers insight for producing new modelgun designs in Japan.

From 1960, the retail shops / import agencies started some modifications (e.g. surface finish from silver to black color) on the imported cap guns locally to make them more realistic and attractive. In 1960–61, MGC (ModelGuns Corporation) released modified Mattel Snub Nose and Hubley Automatic (from a normal cap gun to a cartridge ejection model) which is one step closer to Japanese originated modelgun.

The imported cap guns were eventually replaced with more realistic Japanese indigenous designed and elegantly produced modelguns. The first Japanese designed modelgun is believed to be the Mauser Military Model M1896 (non-ignition model) released by Yamada Plating Industry (later Hudson Industry) in late 1962. Shortly after, MGC released the Walther VP-2 (ignition model with an innovative Slide action design) in early 1963. While there is still no unanimous consensus on the first Japanese modelgun, these 2 models are unarguably one of the pioneers in modelgun history.

In the next 2–3 years, MGC added some more models to its product line and sold its modelguns in bulk to other re-seller companies who sold them under individual brand names. In 1965, MGC started to sell its products in its own shop "MGC Bondshop". Meanwhile, 7 re-seller companies notably Nakata, Tokyo CMC, Hudson, Kokusai, and Malugo formed an allied association Nippon Kokyu Gangu Kumiai (NKG) or Japan Premium Toy Retailers' Union and stopped buying products from MGC. In 1966, the NKG member companies started to compete directly with MGC starting with non-movable paperweight models (mainly by Nakata, but strictly speaking not modelguns) and shortly later some copied MGC products by some NKG members. The competition heat was intensified when NKG members also had their own design of models which were produced by a modelgun manufacturing company Tokyo Replica Corp. (TRC) formed by Marushin Die Casting Industry and Nakata as a joint venture. After that, the modelgun industry boomed and its popularity grew tremendously. The first major change in the Firearms and Swords Law in 1971 did not have much impact to the growth trend.

Before 1977, metal modelguns dominated the market and plastic models were not popular. These early produced full metal modelguns are now sought-after collectables even though they are a bit less precise and detailed as real ones. After 1977 when the second change in the law started to heavily regulate the products, plastic modelguns led the market as only very limited handgun models can be made in full metal.

From 1970 to end-80s, many modelguns (mostly from MGC) were exported to the USA and sold under the RMI brand by Replica Models, Inc. (which later transformed to Collector's Armoury, Ltd.). These exported modelgun products were exempted from the strict Japanese Firearms and Swords Law.

As time went by, modelguns were enhanced technically with more realistic appearance, detailed construction and operation more accurate to real guns due to continuous competition among makers.

However, the roll-out of more Airsoft in the mid-80s has had a big impact to the traditional modelgun industry. The continuous fall in popularity and sales volume of modelguns in the next 40 years forced some modelgun makers either out of business or switching to mainly Airsoft production.

== Legends ==
The Japanese modelgun/Airsoft inventor Tanio Kobayashi (小林太三) is considered by many Japanese to be the "father" of the modelgun. He joined MGC as a chief engineer in 1961. Kobayashi's innovative internal modelgun design (known as Tanio or Slide action which makes the slide cycle to load and eject the cartridge when the trigger is pulled) in MGC Walther VP-2 completely revolutionized the simple cap gun design and led to the modern version of the modelgun. He also led MGC to innovate the safety barrel insert, the cap blowback system and the development of a safe plastic cap exclusively for modelguns. In 1978, The Ministry of International Trade and Industry (MITI) awarded Kobayashi (then Director of Design and Development Division of MGC) Invention Honor Award for the development of safe modelgun design, construction method and contribution to the development of the modelgun industry. He left MGC and established his company Tanio Koba in 1992. His company continues to produce quality Airsoft and modelguns today.

Noboru Mutobe (六人部登) was a craft-worker and joined Nakata in 1962 to design and prototype modelguns for Nakata. His ingeniously designed and prototyped models that were produced by Nakata and later TRC were very competitive with the MGC products. He left Nakata in 1967 and established his own company Rokuken with products in the Rocken brand. Many of the Rocken modelguns which were made in solid brass are also known as high grade luxury models. But the metal modelgun production from Rokuken ceased after the amendment of the Firearms and Swords law in 1977. The Rocken brand metal modelguns were only produced in very small quantity and they are now expensive sought-after collectables. However, Rocken brand and designed high grade plastic modelguns were released by other makers from mid 90s and are still produced today. Mutobe also worked as an independent freelance designer to design and prototype many products for other modelgun companies such as CMC, Suzuki, Asahi Toys. His work is characterized as very realistic replica both the appearance and mechanism as the real ones. His contribution to the Japanese modelgun history is always remembered.

== Regulations ==
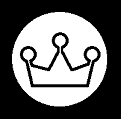
The "Crown" mark used from 1969-1971 on early examples of modelguns. Newer modelguns that passed association approval receive "SPG" (Safe Plastic Gun) or "SMG" (Safe Metal Gun) marks.

The initial modelguns which were made with full metal were originally classified as "toys" and fairly unregulated. When some models were made very close to real firearms both appearance and functionally and several misused cases happened, the authority increasingly intervened the modelgun industry to prevent them to be abused for criminal purposes. So the law was changed in different stages to make the products very safe, easily identifiable as toy guns and extremely hard to modify to fire any projectile.

In 1965, the Japanese government began regulating the replica firearms industry. Changes included was a requirement that the barrel have an internal insert to prevent tampering to fire any projectile.

In 1969, in accordance with the administrative guidance of the Police, the modelguns had to add a crown mark stamp on the body to distinguish it from real gun. However, these models only exist in very small quantity and are hardly found today.

The Firearms and Swords law revision in 1971 introduced more safety changes. It required that the barrel of all metal model handguns released thereafter must be completely blocked up in metal and must be entirely painted in white or yellow (excluding the grip). Since then, all metal model handguns produced were either painted in gold color or gold plated which was accepted as yellow color. Even the pre-1971 produced metal model handgun barrels needed to be blocked up and re-painted in yellow / gold color in order to comply with the law. However, the metal modelguns for export (mainly to RMI) could still be made in black color. Moreover, plastic modelguns started to get into the market as it is not governed by the law and can be produced in black color for more realistic look.

In 1975, the Japan Model Gun Manufacturing Cooperative Association (which later merged into Japanese Toy Gun Association (ASGK) (日本遊戯銃協同組合) in 1986) was formed by most modelguns makers. All members of the Association agreed to stamp on a "SM" mark (Safe Model) on the metal modelgun frame for safety conformation and identification purposes.

The second law revision in 1977 was even stricter. It prohibited the use of hard metal and required modelguns be produced with soft metal (hardness measured by Brinell scale (10/500) 91 HB or less) like zinc alloy in the main parts of metal modelguns. The metal model handguns must also have a completely sealed barrel and add a hardened steel rod molded inside a softer metal barrel to prevent attempts of modification and making it hollow. The front of cylinder chamber of revolvers must be blocked and the barrel and frame of metal model handguns must not be separable to prevent the interchange of the barrel. This new regulation prohibits further production of many full metal model handguns with separable barrel and slide. The ASGK manage the safety approval and the SMG (Safe Model Gun) mark replaced the SM mark on the metal models to identify the models meeting the new regulation.

However, the new law did not apply to modelgun made in plastics and so it also stimulated the production of more plastic modelguns by various manufacturers. The modelgun makers imposed some voluntary industrial restraints (self-regulation) to the plastic modelguns to prevent modification and for easy identification as modelgun. It requires the insert of a piece of hardened steel plate (called spacer) inside and across the barrel and this insert must be visible from the muzzle. Also, the front of cylinder chamber of revolvers must be blocked (fully or partially) by metal barrier too. After that, the ASGK manage the safety approval and a SPG (Safe Plastic Gun) mark started to appear on the plastic modelguns to indicate the conformance to the regulation. But Marushin withdrew from ASGK in 2007 and coordinated to launch the All Japan Toy Gun Safety Association (STGA)(全日本トイガン安全協会). Since then, the STGA mark appears on Marushin and Tanio Koba products for similar safety indication. KSC, Hudson and Kokusai also left ASGK and joined the Japan Air Sports Gun Association (JASG)(日本エアースポーツガン協会) in 2000s and JASG safety mark may appear on some of their newer products. However, some modelguns may hide the safety mark on the frame behind the grips. Nevertheless, all products should have safety label affixed on the packing.

== Types ==
Modelguns can be found in many configurations and types. These range from small pistols/revolvers to rifles, shotguns, assault rifles and sub-machinegun, machineguns models. Among these, handgun models were and are still the most popular in Japan.

The earliest modelguns had a much simpler construction and a crude appearance. The so-called "automatic" handgun models only made use of gunpowder for ignition. The shell ejection and loading of cartridge action requires manually pulling the slide. In 1962, MGC improved the operation with the invention of Tanio Action or Slide Action mechanism which enable cycling the slide backward and forward to eject and load the cartridge with a pull of trigger. The system was also adopted by other modelgun makers in various models in many years. Of course, the construction and operation of these early stage modelguns were not comparable to the real guns. In 1968, MGC developed the breakthrough cap blowback technology which imitate the automated operation more closely to their real-life automatic counterparts.

The commonly available modelguns today are generally classified into display-only (or dummy / non-ignition) and cap-firing (or ignition) versions. There are far fewer "dummy" models than the "ignition" models in the market. Most dummy versions still highly replicate the appearance and internal mechanism of real counterparts with all moving parts work such that chamber / cycling dummy shells and field striping like real ones. The cap-firing modelguns besides highly replicate the appearance and internal mechanism as real guns like the dummy version, they are also able to "fire" the cartridge to produce spark, smoke, bang sound and slide cycling action (blowback) on automatic models.

There are 2 different cap firing systems for blowback modelguns.

The earlier models are with side fire system. The "firing block" (where supposed to have the firing pins for real guns) is in fact a stamped steel block which hits the cartridge rim area when hit by hammer. This system drives the entire cartridge case with cap into the detonator in the barrel to fire the internal cap. This system of course is very different from the design of the real guns.

In contrast, the later or newer models are Center fire system. They are very close replica to the real guns with the firing pin in the slide design. The firing pin hits the center of the cartridge "primer" which push the cap to the detonator to fire the cap.

The modelgun frame is made with materials either in all-metal or plastic. The metal version is mainly made with zinc alloy and many of them are made with slightly different sizes to the real ones to prevent interchange of critical parts. The early modelguns are mostly made with all-metal until 1977 when the law was changed to heavily regulate the metal model handguns. Since then, the plastic modelguns have become mainstream.

Plastic modelguns are usually either made with ABS (Acrylonitrile Butadiene Styrene) or Heavy Weight (HW) plastics. Though modelguns made with ABS plastics do not look and feel good, they are much cheaper, more durable and have better cap blowback performance over metal versions. Most of the ABS plastic models are black in color but some are chrome or nickel plated to replicate the stainless-steel counterparts. The Heavy Weight (a MGC invention) plastic is the ABS resin mixed with some fine metal (usually zinc or iron) powder that makes it heavier and look less plastic. In 1992, MGC released 'Super Real Heavy Weight' or SRH models which were a lot heavier than the normal HW plastic and so look and feel even more realistic. It contained such high amounts of metallic (iron) powder, such that magnets could be attracted to it. Since the SRH material is more brittle, the MGC SRH models were only made for some revolvers and a few dummy semi-auto handguns but the production only lasted for a short period of several months. However, the idea of SRH was adopted by other modelgun makers later. Kokusai released "Mega Heavy Weight" version, Marushin released "Giga Maxi Weight" version and Hobby Fix also released "Mega Weight" version for some of their products. Real McCoy's, Rampant Classic and Elan produce Rocken brand modelguns with Super Lock Light material (plastic mixed with tungsten powder) which has ultra high specific gravity as iron as well as better strength and finish texture. Elan further develop improved Super Lock Light R2.5 resin for its blowback and dummy Rocken models.

== Cartridges ==
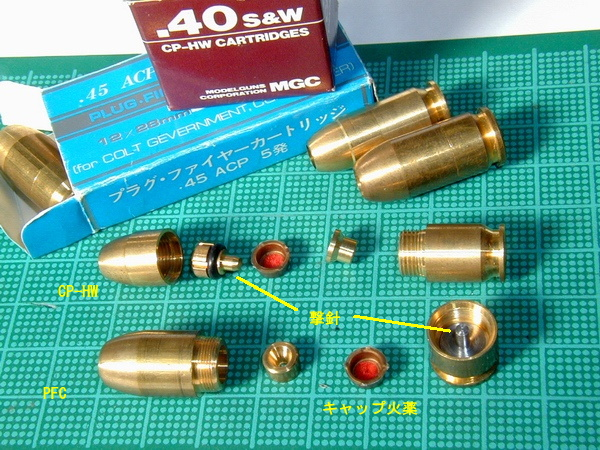
Plugfire cartridges (PFC cap) used in modelguns.

The modelguns cannot use any live or blank cartridges. Instead, the dummy models come with realistic dummy cartridges and cap firing modelguns use special designed cartridges dedicated to each model. The cartridges are usually made of brass or less common aluminum alloy. The design of cartridges changed along with the evolution of modelguns and cap technology. Modelgun cartridges were developed and evolved over time for improved performance and realism. The "firing" of the cap inside the cartridge of commonly available modelguns today produces the visual effect of sparks/smoke, audible effect of bang sound and blowback action for automatic models. After firing, these cartridges can be reusable if cleaned and refilled the cap. Modelgun cartridges are in general not compatible among different manufacturers or different models. Different manufacturers have their own cartridge design and nomenclature as well as the parts count/description.

The very early stage modelgun cartridge was just for ignition purpose with the cap sitting at the tip of the one-piece metal cartridge. It could not perform blowback operation on automatic models. These precious models are mostly collector's pieces and are unlikely to be fired today.

In 1968, MGC developed a MG-Blowback cartridge for open detonator type blow back operation for their blowback models. The cartridge is extremely simple in construction and does not look like a real cartridge at all. It is typically just a single-piece brass open "tube" closed at one end with a machined extractor groove, thus also known as open cartridge. The cap is plugged deep into bottom of the cartridge and fired by a thick detonator pin inside the barrel. The exploded pressure between detonator pin and bottom of cartridge produces the blowback effect. However, it is difficult to achieve stable blowback performance as it uses paper caps which left residue built up on the detonator pin and inside the cartridge. The cartridge is also very hard to clean after fired.

In 1979, plastic cap with a phosphorus composition filler specially designed for modelgun was invented.

In 1980, Marushin developed its own closed type blowback design and it is called Plug Fire Cartridge (PFC). The cartridge has size and shape similar to real cartridges but can be screwed apart. It is made with machined brass multi-piece consisting of a simulated primer, base, piston and the "bullet". The plastic cap is plugged inside and sits on a piston which helps to keep the pressure of exploded gas to provide the blowback force. The blowback performance is much improved and cleanup is also easier.

Following the Marushin PFC, MGC also developed CP-Blowback cartridge (CP is an MGC acronym for Cap Piston that relates to the "piston" design of the MGC cartridges) to change from open cartridge to closed type cartridge in 1982. Since then, all other modelgun makers adopted similar closed type cartridge design for their blowback models – Piston Push Cartridge from Tokyo CMC, Blowback CTG Cartridge from Kokusai, Piston Fire Cartridge from Hudson. Later various modelgun makers further enhanced the design with additional rubber O-ring to further enhance the air-seal inside the cartridge. It provides even better blowback performance especially for the Heavy Weight models. This finally comes to the current blowback cartridges: - CP-HW cartridge from MGC, New Piston Fire cartridge from Hudson, New Plug Fire Cartridge and X-PFC from Marushin, Evolution cartridge from Tanaka, etc.

Surprisingly, Tanio Koba released the GM7 with plastic open blowback cartridge in 2009 and supplemented with aluminum alloy open cartridge later. However, it changed to an Easy CP blowback system in 2015.

For revolvers, there are 2 main design of cartridges.

MGC, CMC, Marui and Kokusai (early models) adopted closed cylinder design which had integral firing pins mounted at the front chamber end. The cap was plugged at the front tip of the cartridge (usually one-piece) and the cartridges were shorter than real ones.

KSC, Marushin, Tanaka, HWS, CAW and newer plastic Kokusai revolvers adopt open cylinder design which just have a steel plate to partially block the chamber end. The firing pin is integrated in the cartridge design and the cap is plugged inside the cartridge. The cartridge can be made in full length (or very close to) as the real one.

The recent models of Tanaka, Marushin, Kokusai, Elan and HWS even make their cartridge's "bullet" portion screw separable and in silver or copper color so that they look very realistic lead / copper bullet cartridge. There are also some aftermarket cap-firing cartridges produced by Mulberry Field, B.W.C., C-Tec / Malugo and Tanio Koba for some selected compatible models of modelgun. Many of them are even designed to accommodate double or triple caps in their cartridge for enhanced blowback, sound and muzzle flash effect.

Mulberry Field, C-Tec / Malugo, Right, Elan and KSC make full size dummy cartridges for display and manual operation purposes. The dummy cartridge has built in spring supported movable primer for dry firing. It also comes with realistic screw-on copper or lead "bullet" head and genuine rim markings.

== Caps ==
The very early days of modelguns used the same paper roll caps imported from the United States for the cap guns. Later it was replaced by the Japanese made paper caps which were "printed" on flat sheets of red paper with perforations. However, paper caps had a safety problem because friction may ignite the caps and cause burns. Paper caps also had problems such as clogging of the burning residue of the baseboard and high corrosive of the gunpowder itself. Blowback performance by paper caps is unstable and malfunction frequently occurs in most models.

In 1979, a Japanese gunpowder manufacturer Kaneko developed a plastic bodied cap exclusively for modelguns in collaboration with MGC (MGC named it M.G. Cap). With the gunpowder contained in a small plastic cup, the cap is safer to handle and easier to load. The gunpowder used is less corrosive and less residue after burning. The plastic bodied cap also enhances the blowback performance as the cap acts as a seal inside the cartridge to maintain the exploded pressure. The caps are standardized to be either 7 mm or 5 mm in diameter for normal size and compact size cartridge. These Kaneko-produced modelgun caps eventually became universal and adopted by all modelgun manufacturers. Marushin named it "Plug Fire Cap". The most common type is marked as "Automatic" which uses gunpowder with a lower burning speed to enhance the blowback operation for automatic models. Kaneko also released a variant called Kanecap or Real Flame Cap which contains a metallic content that sparks brightly as well as smoke when the cap ignites to enhance the firing effect.

== Manufacturers ==
=== Defunct ===
The MGC and Hudson Industry were 2 early modelgun manufacturers that produced the original Japanese-designed modelguns in 1962–63. Over the following decades, both manufacturers produced numerous models before eventually ceasing operations.

MGC closed the manufacturing and ceased all toy gun production in late 1994. The molds and production equipment were taken over by its parent company Taito and Shin Nippon Mokei (New Japan Model). The modelgun production was continued and traded as New MGC. But the company started selling its molds and production equipment from 2007 and production finally ceased in April 2010.

In December 2009, Hudson Industry suddenly closed its toy gun business and ceased all modelgun production.

Other early key makers are Tokyo CMC, Nakata and Kokusai (International Industry) which started modelgun production in mid-60s. Nakata and Tokyo CMC ceased modelgun business respectively in late 70s and 1985. In 2003 Kokusai went into bankruptcy after an earlier factory fire and was taken over by Sun Project. The modelgun production was resumed in Kokusai brand with the remaining modelgun molds. Later the molds and equipment were sold to Uriu Limited (a die casting Co.) which continued the production still in Kokusai brand until January 2018 when its modelgun production finally ceased.

There were some other smaller makers around 70s-80s like Malugo, KKS (Komoda Shoten), Suzuki, Asahi Toys (under the "Asahi Eagle" brand) and Matsushiro but they only produced just very few models.

Upon the closing down of the aforesaid manufacturers, it is fortunate that some or all their molds and manufacturing equipment were sold to other modelgun manufacturers to continue the model production.

Western Arms once produced a few modelgun models in 70s-80s. Tokyo Marui also produced some plastic modelgun kits in 80s-90s. Both Western Arms and Tokyo Marui produce airsoft only at present.

L&S Co. in Japan produced many 1:1 scale plastic modelgun kits (dummy models requiring glue to assemble) in 70s-80s which were widely exported worldwide. A few of their molds were later acquired by Academy in Korea before L&S was closed down in 1992. However, Academy only produced limited quantity of the modelgun kits in short period of time.

Rokuken is famous in its "ROCKEN" brand brass luxury modelgun though only produced in very small quantity. The production started from 1967 and it further partnered with Western Arms in 1974 to sell these high-priced brass modelguns. But the production was stopped in 1977 after the amendment of the Firearms and Sword law. However, Rocken brand and designed high grade plastic models are released from Real McCoy's, Rampant Classic and Elan from mid-90s.

=== Active ===
As of 2021, the active modelgun manufacturers in Japan are Marushin, Tanaka Works, HWS (Hartford Work Shop), KSC, CAW (Craft Apple Works), Tanio Koba, Elan and Hobby Fix. Among them, Marushin and HWS also offer modelgun kits for sale.

There are two other companies producing modelguns outside Japan: HawSan and Denix.

HawSan (or Hwasan / Wa Shan), a Taiwanese company, is the only company which produces many modern cap-firing capable modelguns outside Japan. HawSan is known for producing cap-firing full-metal handguns in black or silver color. It also produces single-use disposable cartridges with pre-installed caps. Since their modelgun products do not conform with the related Japanese laws, they are not allowed in Japan. However, the Company focus more on airsoft since 2020 when the Toy Gun law in Taiwan is revised to heavily regulate the modelguns.

Denix S.A., based in Spain, produces many replicas of historical weapons including flintlock and caplock dummy pistols for use as decorations or props. Its replica products cover very wide varieties from many centuries up to the 1980s. Though many of their modern replicas are made with full metal, only very few of them are capable to fire caps.

== See also ==
- Cap gun
