= Nichols Industries =

Nichols Industries, Inc. was primarily known as the manufacturer of cap pistols.

== History ==
The company was established by the families of brothers, Lewis W. Nichols, Jr. and Talley W. Nichols, in Pasadena, Texas in 1946. The first cap pistol was single-shot "Silver Pony".

In 1950, Lewis Nichols became a Methodist minister and sold his share to his brother. Talley Nichols incorporated the company the same year. In 1955, the expanded plant moved to Jacksonville, Texas.

Cap pistols were popular in the mid-1950s due to many Western films being included in prime time television programming. With the decrease of popularity of Westerns, the sales of pistols decreased sharply, and in 1965, the company merged with Kusan, Inc. of Nashville, Tennessee, a plastic injection mold manufacturer, whose significant business was toys. In early 1970,Bethlehem Steel Corp. bought Kusan in an effort to diversify its business into plastics operations.

Collectibles expert, Harry L. Rinker, notes that Kusan continued to use Nichols dies and many pieces were named "Nichols/Kusan", but eventually the name "Nichols" was discontinued. The website, nicholscapguns.com, contains histories of various toy cap guns, of Nichols, and some other major models.

Nichols Industries also manufactured slingshots and some other toys, including toy cars and trucks.
