= List of model aircraft manufacturers =

The following companies manufacture, or have manufactured, model aircraft.

== Flying ==
=== Ready-to-fly ===
A ready-to-fly model has the airframe assembled but may or may not have an engine or other equipment fitted.

=== Almost ready-to-fly ===
- Guillow

=== Kits ===
A flying model kit requires a good deal of work to construct the airframe before it can fly.

- Black Horse Models (Vietnam)
- Diels Engineering (USA)
- Easy Built Models (USA)
- FMK Model kits (UK & Bulgaria)
- Frog (UK)
- Flite Test (USA)
- Hensons Hobbies (UK)
- Keil-Kraft (UK)
- Kipera Craft (Japan)
- Kyosho (Japan)
- DiWings Aeromodelismo (ARG)
- Mercury (UK)
- Minamikawachi Aero Models (Japan) - ex-Lattle Snake
- The Miniature Aircraft Factory (UK & Bulgaria)
- OK Model (Japan)
- Peck-Polymers (USA)
- Roban (China)
- Seagull Models (Vietnam)
- SIG (USA)
- Studio Mid (Japan)
- Tiger Seisakusyo (Japan)
- Tough Jets (USA)
- Tubame Gangu (Japan)
- Veron (UK)
- The World Models (Hong Kong, Hong Kong)
- Yamada (Japan)

== Static ==
=== To scale ===
Static scale models are used for collection or display.

- Aero le Plane (Hong Kong SAR)
- AeroClassics (USA)
- Atlantic-Models, Inc. (USA)
- Blue Box
- Calibre Wings (Singapore)
- Corgi Toys (UK)
- Dragon Wings (China)
- Easy Model (China)
- Factory Direct Models (USA)
- Fiberworks International (Philippines)
- Flight Miniatures (USA)
- Shopping Zone Plus (Canada)
- GeminiJets (USA)
- Guillermo Rojas Bazan (USA)
- Herpa Wings (Germany)
- Hobby Master (China)
- Hogan Wings (Hong Kong SAR)
- IDT Jets (USA)
- Inflight200
- JC Wings (Hong Kong SAR)
- Konishi Model (Japan)
- Legacy Jets LLC (USA)
- Long Prosper (China)
- Lupa Aircraft Models (Netherlands)
- Matchbox (UK)
- Mastercraft Collection
- PacMin (Pacific Miniatures) (USA)
- Modelworks Direct (USA)
- ModelBuffs (Philippines)
- NG Model (China)
- Phoenix Model (Taiwan)
- Pinfei Model Aircraft (China)
- Postage Stamp (USA)
- Showcase Models
- Skymarks (UK)
- Socatec Aircraft Models
- Squadron Nostalgia LLC (USA)
- Squadron Toys
- Toys and Models Corporation
- Wing Factory (Japan)
- Wooster
- Velocity Models
- YourCraftsman/BigBird

=== Not to scale ===
These models are not scale replicas of any full-size design.

- The Aeroplane Models (India)

== Scale kits ==
A scale model is a replica of some full-size design (which may or may not be a real aircraft).

=== Papercraft ===
- FlyModel (Poland)
- GPM (Poland)
- Halinski (Poland)
- Hooton AirCraft (UK)
- JSC (Poland)
- ModelArt (Bulgaria)
- Modelik (Poland)
- Schreiber-Bogen Kartonmodellbau (Germany)
- DiWings Aeromodelismo (Argentina)

=== Plastic ===
- 12 Squared (USA)
- 3D Blitz Models (Switzerland)
- AA Models (China)
- A&A Models (Ukraine) - brand of Modelsvit
- ABC Modelfarb (Poland)
- A.B.&K Hobby Kits (Czech Republic)
- Academy Minicraft (Korea)
- Academy Plastic Model Co. (Korea)
- Accessories Great Britain (UK)
- Accurate Miniatures (USA)
- Ace Corporation (Korea)
- Ace Models (Ukraine)
- Adams (USA)
- Addar (USA)
- Admiral (Czech Republic) - brand of AZ model
- Advent (USA) - brand of Revell
- AER-Moldova (Moldova)
- Aeroclub (UK)
- Aerofile (France)
- aero=naut Modellbau (Germany)
- Aero Team (Czech Republic)
- Aero Plast (Poland)
- AFV Club (Taiwan)
- AGA (Poland)
- AHM (USA)
- AIM Fan Model (Ukraine)
- Airfix (UK) - from 1950 to present
- Air Lines (USA)
- Airpower87 (Germany) - brand of ArsenalM
- AK Interactive (Spain)
- Alanger (Russia) - re-boxed many ICM kits. Went bankrupt in 2008; molds (mostly) taken over by ARK-models
- Alfa (Russia)
- Algernon Product (Japan) - subsidiary of CafeReo
- Aliplast (Italy)
- AMC Models (Czech Republic)
- AML (Czech Republic)
- Ammo by MIG Jimenez (Spain)
- Amodel (Ukraine)
- AMP (Ukraine) - brand of Mikromir
- AMT (bought by ERTL toys) (USA) - no longer manufacture aircraft models
- AMT-Frog (USA-UK)
- AMT-Hasegawa (USA-Japan)
- AMT-Matchbox (USA-UK)
- AMtech (USA)
- Amusing Hobby (Japan)
- Answer Kits (Poland)
- Antares (Czech Republic)
- Aoshima Bunka Kyozai (Japan)
- Apex (Russia)
- Arc En Ciel (Japan)
- Arii (Japan)
- ARK-models (Russia) - ex-Alanger
- Arma Hobby (Poland)
- Armory Model Group (Ukraine)
- Arsenal Model Group (Ukraine)
- ART model (Ukraine)
- Artiplast (Italy)
- Asahi Sangyo (Japan)
- Astra (Poland)
- Atlantic (Italy)
- Atlantis Model (USA)
- Atom (Japan)
- Attack Hobby Kits (Czech Republic)
- Aurora Plastics Corporation (USA) - sold their molds to Monogram in 1977, and later bought by Revell
- Aurora-Heller (USA-France)
- AvanGarde Model Kits (AMK) (Macau, China)
- Avia (Russia)
- AVI Models (Czech Republic)
- Avis (Ukraine)
- AV-USK / Aviation USK (USA)
- AZ model (Czech Republic)
- Azur (Czech Republic/France) - Brand of Special Hobby
- Bachmann (USA) - imported Fujimi kits into the USA
- Bandai (Japan)
- Banpresto (Japan)
- Bat Project (Ukraine)
- Battlefront Miniatures (New Zealand)
- Beacon Models (UK)
- Beechnut Models (USA)
- Bego (Japan)
- Ben Hobby (Japan)
- Big Planes Kits (Ukraine)
- Bigmodel (Poland)
- Bílek (Czech Republic)
- Blue Bird (Japan)
- Blue Ribbon (Mexico)
- Blue Tank (Taiwan)
- Bobcat Hobby Model Kits (China)
- BorderModel (China)
- Brengun (Czech Republic)
- Brifaut (France)
- Bronco Models (Hong Kong, China)
- Bull Mark (Japan)
- Bushu (Germany)
- Buzco (USA) - re-boxed and issued Heller kits in the USA
- CafeReo (Japan)
- Cap Croix De Sud (France)
- C.C.Lee (China)
- Central (Japan)
- Chematic (Poland)
- Classic Airframes (USA)
- Classic Plane (Germany)
- Clear Prop! (Ukraine)
- Cobra Company (USA)
- Comet (USA)
- Condor (Czech Republic) - Brand of Special Hobby
- Condor (Ukraine)
- Cooperativa (Russia)
- Copper State Model (Latvia)
- Crown (Japan)
- Cyber-Hobby (Hong Kong, China) - brand of Dragon Models
- Czech Model (Czech Republic)
- DACO/Skyline (Belgium)
- D-Corporation (Korea)
- Dakoplast (Russia)
- Das Werk (Germany)
- Delta 2 (Italy) - ex-Delta
- DioBros (Malaysia)
- Donetsk Toys Factory (Ukraine)
- Dora Wings (Ukraine)
- Doyusha (Japan)
- Dragon Models/DML (Hong Kong, China)
- DreamModel (China)
- Eaglewall (UK)
- Eastern Express (Russia)
- Ebbro (MMP co., ltd.) (Japan)
- Eduard (Czech Republic)
- Elaga (Brazil)
- Eldon (USA)
- Elf (Czech Republic)
- Emhar (UK)
- Encore (Latvia)
- Entex (USA)
- ESCI (Italy)
- Esci-Ertl (Italy)
- Esci-Scale Craft (Italy)
- Eurokit (France)
- Falcon (New Zealand)
- Faller (Germany)
- Fine Molds (Japan)
- Firefox (Poland)
- Flashback (Czech Republic)
- Fly (Czech Republic)
- FlyHawk Model (China)
- Flying Machines (Italy)
- Flugzeug (Germany)
- Fonderie Miniature (France)
- F-RSIN Plastic (France)
- Frog (UK) - from 1930s to 1970s. Moulds taken over by Novo and Revell
- Freedom Model Kits (FMK) (Taiwan / EU) - 2014–present
- Frems (Italy)
- F-Toys (Japan)
- Fuji Hobby (Japan)
- Fujimi (Japan)
- Galaxy (China)
- GaleForce Nine (USA)
- Gartex (Japan) - brand of Hasegawa
- Gaspatch Models (Greece)
- Gavia (Czech Republic)
- Glencoe Models (USA)
- G-Mark (Japan)
- Golden Ade Hobby Kits (Ukraine) - brand of Olimp Models
- Gran (Russia)
- Grand Phoenix Model Products (USA)
- Great Wall Hobby (China)
- Greenbank Castle (USA)
- Greenmax (Japan)
- Griffon (Japan) - Only produced one kit (Su-22 in 1/72nd scale) before disappearing.
- Grip (Japan) - ex-Eidai
- Gunze Sangyo (Japan)
- Hapdong Tech (Korea)
- Hasegawa Corporation (Japan) - first products in 1961
- Hawk (USA)
- Hehexing (China)
- Heller SA (France)
- Heller-Humbrol (France) (Heller ownership)
- HGW Models (Czech Republic)
- High Planes (Australia)
- Hi-Tech (France)
- Hit Kit (Poland)
- HK Models (Hong Kong, China)
- HMA Garage (Japan)
- Hobby 2000 (Poland)
- Hobby Boss (China)
- Hobbycraft (Canada)
- Hobby Network (Japan)
- Hobby Spot U (Japan)
- HPM (HiPM) (Czech Republic)
- Hippo (Czech Republic)
- HR Model (Czech Republic)
- Huma modell (Germany)
- Ibex Plastic Models (Israel)
- IBG Models (Poland)
- ICM (Ukraine)
- Idea (Korea)
- Ideal Toy Company (ITC) (USA)
- Ikar (ИКАР) (Russia)
- Ikegi (Japan)
- Ikko Mokei (Japan) - ex-Terashima Mokei
- IloveKit (China)
- IM (International Modeling) (USA)
- Imai Kagaku (Japan)
- IMC (Industro-Motive Corporation) (USA)
- Imex Model (USA)
- Infinity Models (Czech Republic) - brand of HpH models
- Innex Model (Poland)
- Inpact Kits (UK)
- Imperial Hobby Productions (USA)
- Intech (Poland)
- Interavia (Ukraine)
- IOM-kit (Ukraine) - brand of Avis
- IPMS Austria (Austria)
- Italaerei (Italy) - renamed to Italeri
- Italeri (Italy)
- Jach (Czech Republic)
- JAYS Hobby Products (New Zealand) - Online Store Based in The Catlins, NZ. EST.2008
- JAYS Model Kits (New Zealand) - sold through JAYS Hobby Products
- Jo-Han (USA)
- Kabaya (Japan)
- Kader (Hong Kong, China)
- Kaiyodo (Japan)
- KA Models (Korea)
- Kangnam (Korea)
- Karaya (Poland)
- Karo-as Modellbau (Germany)
- Kawai (Japan)
- K&B (USA)
- Keil-Kraft (UK) - mainly flying models but some plastic kits
- Kellogg's (USA)
- Kepuyuan (China)
- Kiddyland (Taiwan)
- Kiko (Brazil)
- Kinetic (Hong Kong, China)
- Ki-Tech (Hobbycraft Canada production in China)
- Kitty Hawk Model (China)
- KitPro (Czech Republic)
- Kiwi Wings (New Zealand) - see Tasman Model Products.
- Koga (Japan)
- Kogure (Japan)
- Korpak (Belarus) - ex-Mir
- KoPro (Czech Republic) - ex-KP
- Kora Models (Czech Republic)
- Kotare Models (New Zealand)
- Kovozavody Semily (Czechoslovakia)
- KP (Kovozávody Prostějov) (Czechoslovakia) - from 1969
- KP Models (Hungary) - acquired Czech KP(Kopro) in 2009
- Legato (Czech Republic) - brand of AZ model
- Leoman (USA)
- LF Models (Czech Republic)
- Life-Like (USA)
- Lincoln International (Hong Kong, UK)
- Lindberg (USA)
- LionRoar (China)
- Litaki model kit (Ukraine)
- Lodela (Mexico)
- LO Model (Taiwan)
- LS (L&S) (Japan)
- LTD Models (USA)
- Mac Distribution (Czech Republic)
- Mach 2 (France)
- Magic Factory (China)
- Mania Hobby (Japan) - ex-Mania
- Mannen (Japan) - ex-Modeler
- Maquette (Russia)
- Marivox (Sweden)
- Mark I. Models (Czech Republic) - brand of 4+ publication
- Mars Models (Ukraine)
- Marufuji (Japan)
- Marusan (Japan)
- Master Craft (Poland)
- Matchbox (UK) - ceased production, some moulds taken over by Revell Germany
- Mauve (Japan)
- Meikraft Models (USA) - ceased production of limited run plastic kits, later kits of are of very good quality
- Meng Model (China)
- Merit (UK) - ceased production of plastic model aircraft sometime in the late 1950s
- Merit International (USA)
- Merlin Model (UK)
- MGD Models (Czech Republic)
- Micro Ace (Japan) - ex-Arii
- Micro Scale Design (Russia)
- Midori Plastic. Kit (KSN) (Japan)
- Mikro72 (Poland)
- MikroMir (Ukraine)
- MiniArt (Ukraine)
- Minibace (China)
- Minicraft Model Kits, Inc. (USA)
- MiniHobbyModels (Macau, China) - brand of Trumpeter
- Miniwing (Czech Republic)
- Mir (Belarus) - renamed to Korpak
- Mirage Hobby (Poland)
- Miroslav Němeček (Czech Republic)
- Mister Kit (Italy)
- Mitsuwa Model (Japan)
- Mixkit (France)
- Miyauchi (Japan)
- Modela (Czechoslovakia)
- Modelcollect (China)
- Modelcraft (Canada)
- Modelism (Romania)
- Modelist (Russia) - re-boxed kits from Academy, Trumpeter, Dakoplast etc.
- Model News (Czech Republic)
- Modelsvit (Ukraine)
- Model USA (USA)
- Modelworks Direct (USA)
- Monochrome (Japan) - brand of Interallied
- Monogram (USA) - bought by Revell
- Model Products Corporation (MPC)
- Model Russia (Russia)
- MP (Japan) - ex-Million Mokei
- MPM production s.r.o. (Czech Republic)
- MRC (USA)
- MTS (Czech Republic)
- Munin Models (Sweden)
- MustHave! Models (France)
- Nakamura Sangyo (Japan)
- Nakotne (Latvia)
- NAL / C-CADD Model Shop (India)
- NBK Model Kit (Nihon Bunka Kyozai) (Japan)
- NC Models (Japan)
- Nichimo (Japan)
- Nihon Plastic (Japan)
- Nishikiya Models (J.N.M.C.) (Japan)
- Nitto (Japan)
- Niplast (Serbia)
- NKAP (Russia) - see Ikar
- NOVO Aircraft Kits (UK/USSR)
- Occidental Réplicas (Portugal)
- Octopus (Czech Republic)
- ODK (Odaka) (Japan)
- OEZ (Czech Republic)- kits later reboxed by Smer, Airfix and Revell at various times
- Ogonek (Russia)
- OKB-144 (Russia)
- Olimp Models (Ukraine)
- One Man Model (Japan)
- Orange Hobby (China)
- Oriental Model (Japan)
- Otaki (Japan) - went bankrupt in the mid 1980s. Molds acquired later by Doyusha & Arii.
- OzMods Scale Models (Australia)
- Pacific Coast Models (USA)
- Panda Models (China)
- Pantera (Poland)
- Paramount (Canada)
- Parc Models (Romania)
- Pavla Models (Czech Republic)
- Pegaso/Necomisa (Mexico)
- Pegasus (UK)
- Pegasus Hobbies (USA)
- Pilot Repricas (Sweden)
- Pioneer 2 (UK)
- Pit-load (Japan)
- PJ Production (Belgium)
- Plasticart (East Germany) - see VEB Plasticart
- Plasticos Lodela (Mexico)
- Plastic Planet (Czech Republic)
- Plastruct (USA)
- Platz (Japan)
- Plusmodel (Czech Republic)
- PM Model (Turkey)
- Politechnika (Russia)
- Popy (Japan)
- Precision Hobby Kits (USA) - 1950s
- Premier Planes (UK)
- Premiere (UK)
- Profiline (Czech Republic)
- Pro Modeler (USA) - brand of Revell-Monogram
- Pyro Plastics Corporation (Pyro) (USA)
- PZW (Poland)
- Rare-Plane Detective (USA)
- RCR Models (Italy)
- Red Star (UK)
- Red Wings (Russia)
- Renwal (USA)
- Retrowings (UK)
- Revell (USA)
- Revell-Monogram (USA)
- Revell of Germany (Germany) - split from Revell US
- Ringo (USA) - ex-ITC
- Rising Models (Czech Republic)
- Rocket Models (Japan)
- Roden (Ukraine)
- Roskopf (Germany)
- R.P.M. (Poland)
- RS models (Czech Republic)
- RT modell (Germany)
- Rubicon Models (UK)
- Ruch (Poland)
- Rush Model Kits (Ukraine)
- R.V.Aircraft (Czech Republic)
- Saneki Model (Japan)
- Sankyo Mokei (Japan)
- Sanshoh (Japan)
- Sanwa Plastic (Japan)
- Sabre Kits (Czech Republic)
- Sector (Japan)
- Seminar (Korea)
- Shizukyo (Japan)
- Shizuoka Hobby (Japan)
- Siedlce (Poland)
- Siga Models (Ukraine)
- Silver Cloud (UK)
- Skale Wings (Ukraine)
- Skarabey (Russia)
- SK Model (Poland)
- Skunk Models (Hong Kong, China)
- Sky-High (Ukraine) - brand of Amodel
- S-Mars (China)
- Směr (Czech Republic) - some molds from Heller and Artiplast/Aurora
- S&M Models (UK)
- Snowman Model (Hong Kong, China)
- Solido (France)
- Sova-M (Ukraine)
- South Front (Russia)
- S.P (Sanada Plastic Kougyosho) (Japan)
- Special Hobby (Czech Republic) - ex-MPM
- Spójnia (Poland)
- Stankowski (Poland)
- Starfix (Israel)
- STC Start (Russia)
- Storm Factory (China)
- Stransky (Czech Republic)
- Stream (Russia)
- Strombecker (USA)
- Sunny International (Japan)
- Supermodel (Italy) - from early 1970s
- Suyata (Hong Kong, China)
- Swallow Model (Japan)
- Sweet (Japan)
- Sword (Czech Republic)
- Taimei (Japan)
- Taka (Japan)
- Takara (Japan)
- Takom (Hong Kong, China)
- Tamiya (Japan)
- Tan Model (Turkey)
- Tarangus (Sweden)
- T-ARTS Company (Japan) - ex-Yujin
- Tasman Model Products (New Zealand) - Now based in The Catlins, NZ 2012. see JAYS Model Kits
- Tauro Model (Italy)
- Techmod (Poland)
- Testors (USA)
- Testors-Fujimi (USA-Japan)
- Testors-Italeri (USA-Italy)
- Tiger Model (Hong Kong, China)
- TMD (Japan)
- Toga (Germany)
- Toho (Japan)
- Toko (Ukraine)
- Tokyo Marui (Japan)
- Tokyo Plamo (Japan) - ex-Sanwa Plastic
- Tomy (Japan)
- Tomytec (Japan)
- Trimaster (Japan)
- Tristar (Hong Kong, China)
- Trumpeter (Macau, China)
- TSM (Tokyo Sharp Mokei) (Japan)
- Tsukuda Hobby (Japan)
- Tsusho (Terashima Tsusho) (Japan)
- Tupolev (Russia)
- Unda (Moldova)
- Unimax (Hong Kong, China)
- Unimodel (Ukraine)
- Union Model (Japan)
- UPC (USA) imported and re-packaged kits in the 1960s from Frog, Marusan, Aoshima, Hasegawa, Fujimi & many Japanese companies
- Upgrade - See Tasman Model Products
- US Airfix (Airfix kits for USA market)
- Valhalla (UK) - Same maker as Veeday
- Valom (Czech Republic)
- Varney (USA)
- Vaso (Russia)
- VEB Plasticart (East Germany)
- Veeday (UK)
- Ventura (Australia)
- VES (Russia)
- Victrix (UK)
- Vista (Czech Republic) - ex- Kovozavody Semily
- Waltersons (Hong Kong, China)
- Warrior Model (Poland)
- Williams Bros. (USA)
- Wingman Models (Germany)
- Wingnut Wings (New Zealand)
- Wingsy Kits (Ukraine)
- WK models (Germany)
- Wolfpack Design (Korea)
- X-Scale Models (Ukraine)
- Xtrakit (UK)
- Xuntong models (China)
- YMC (Japan)
- Yodel (Japan)
- YTS (Asahi Mokei) (Japan)
- Yumo (Jugoslavija)
- Z.A. Plastic Model (Japan) - renamed to Aihara
- Zhengdefu (China) - ex-Kitech
- Zlinek (Czech Republic)
- Zoukei-Mura (Japan) - subsidiary of Volks
- ZP Ruch (Poland)
- ZTS Plastyk (Poland)
- Zvezda (Russia)

=== Resin-cast, vacuum-formed, metal, multi-material ===
- A+V Models (Czech Republic) - resin
- A&W Models (Japan) - resin
- AEROBASE (Japan) - photo-etched metal
- Aeroclub (UK) - vac-form
- Aircraft In Miniature (AIM) including Transport Wings (vac-forms), Rug Rat Resins, and Historic Wings (etched brass) (UK)
- Air Craft Models (UK) - vac-forms
- AIRFrame (The Aviation Workshop/Model Alliance) (UK) - resin
- Airmodel (Germany) - resin
- AirModels (UK) - resin
- Akatombo Works (Japan) - resin
- Aki Products (Japan) - resin
- Alliance Models (Czech Republic) - resin
- Anigrand Craftswork (Hong Kong, China) - resin
- Ardpol (Poland) - resin
- Asuka Red Baron (Japan) - resin
- Atelier Noix (Japan) - resin
- Aviattic (UK) - resin
- AVM Scale Models (Chile) - resin
- Barracuda Studios (USA) - resin
- Blue Rider (UK) - vac-forms
- Bra.Z Models (Italy) - resin
- Broplan (Poland) - vac-forms
- Bunker Studio (China) - 3D-printed
- Choroszy Modelbud (Poland) - resin
- Classic Plane (Germany) - resin
- CMK (Czech Master Kit) (Czech Republic) - resin, brand of Special Hobby
- Collect Aire (USA) - resin
- Combat Models (USA) - vac-forms
- Contrail (UK) - vac-forms
- Cooper Details (USA) - vac-form and resin
- Croco (Latvia) - resin
- Czech Master Resin (Czech Republic) - resin, brand of 4+ publication
- Dameya (Japan) - resin
- D&M Daneplane (Denmark) - "Nielsen & Winther Aa" Vacu kit
- DeAgostini Japan (Japan) - multi-material
- Decarli model (Czech Republic) - resin
- Dekno (Spain) - resin
- Dubena (Czechoslovakia) - vac-forms
- Dujin (France) - resin and vac-form
- DynaVector (UK/Japan) - vac-forms
- Eagle Editions (USA) - resin
- Esoteric Models (UK) - vac-forms
- Execuform (USA) - vac-forms
- Falcon (New Zealand) - resin and vac-forms
- Fantastic Plastic Models (USA) - resin
- FE Resin (Czech Republic) - resin
- Fisher Model & Pattern (USA) - resin
- Five Star Model (China) - resin
- Fly (Czech Republic) - injection moulding, resin and etched metal parts
- Formaplane (UK) - vac-forms
- Foxone Design Studio (Japan) - resin
- Freightdog Models (UK) - resin
- F-RSIN (France) - resin
- Fun Model (Poland) - vac-forms
- Gremlin Models by Zed (Yugoslavia) - resin
- Gull Model (Japan) - vac-forms
- Halberd models (Ukraine) - resin
- Heritage Aviation (UK) - resin
- High Planes
- Hobby Space Mechadoll (Japan) - resin
- HpH models (Czech Republic) - resin
- HS Models (Korea) - 3D-printed
- I.D. Models (UK) - vac-forms
- Incth (Japan) - photo-etched metal
- IsraCast (Israel) - resin
- Jasmine Model (China) - photo-etched metal
- JMK (Poland) - vac-forms
- JN Model (Japan) - resin
- Joystick (UK) - vac-forms
- KAJuK (Russia) - vac-forms, resin
- Karaya (Poland) - resin
- Kiwi Resin Models (New Zealand) - resin
- Kombe Models (Denmark) - "O-maskine IO/IIO" resin kit
- Konishi Model (Japan) - resin
- Kora Models (Czech Republic) - resin
- Koster Aero Enterprises (USA) - high quality mixed media vacuform conversions and complete subjects
- L&M Resin Kits (Croatia) - resin
- L'Arsenal (France) - resin, 3D-printed
- Leoman Brothers (USA) - ceased production of limited run resin kits upon death of company principle
- LF Models (Czech Republic) - resin
- LGW Miniatures (UK) - resin
- Libramodels (UK) - vac-forms
- Lino (Poland) - vac-forms
- LM Models (Croatia)
- Lone Star Model (USA) - vac-forms
- Luedemann (Germany) - resin
- Mach3 Models (Japan) - resin
- Mackit (ltaly) - mixed metal/plastic
- Magna Models (Spain) - resin
- Matuo Kasten (Japan) - resin
- Metal Time models (Ukraine) - metal
- Missing Link (Germany) - resin
- Miyazawa (Japan) - resin
- Modelium (Japan) - 3D-printed
- Modelland (Poland) - vac-forms
- ModelsPark (Latvia) - vac-forms
- Modelworks Direct (USA) - resin
- Nova (USA) - vac-forms
- Omega Models (Czech Republic) - resin
- OzMods Scale Models (Australia) - resin and vac-forms
- Pepelatz (Russia) - resin, brand of Prop & Jet
- Phoenix Models (UK) - vac-forms
- Planet Models (Czech Republic) - resin, brand of Special Hobby
- Pinfei Model Airplane (China) - ABS Resin
- Pro Resin (Ukraine) - resin, brand of Olimp Models
- Project X (UK) - vac-forms
- Prop & Jet (Russia) - vac-forms, resin
- PSC (Poland) - vac-forms
- Raccoon (Japan) - resin
- Rareplane (UK) - vac-forms
- Replica (France) - resin
- Right Stuff (Japan) - resin, ex-Trimaster
- Roseplane (USA) - vac-forms
- Sanger (USA) - vac-forms
- S.B.S model (Hungary) - resin
- Seed Hobby (China) - 3D-printed, brand of Five Star Model
- sem model (Italy) - resin
- Sierra Scale Models (USA) - vac-forms
- Signifer (France) - resin, ex-Sinifer
- Silver Wings (Poland) - resin
- Stokit (Denmark) - "KZ II T" resin kit
- Shantou Pinfei Models (China) - ABS resin and metal
- Tenyo (Japan) - metal
- Toki Hobby (Japan) - metal
- Tokiwa Aircraft Create (Japan) - resin
- Tom's Modelworks (USA) - resin, vac-forms, 3D-printed
- Tori Factory (Korea) - 3D-printed
- Toy Craft Berg (Japan) - resin
- Triple Nuts (Japan) - resin, 3D-printed
- Unicraft (Ukraine) - resin
- Unlimited Air Models (Japan) - resin
- Ushimodel (Japan) - resin
- V1 Models (Japan) - 3D-printed
- VacWings (US) - vac-forms
- Vami (Belgium) - resin
- VLE Models (USA) - vac-forms
- Volks (Japan) - resin
- VP (Canada) - vac-forms
- Waku (Poland) - vac-forms
- Welsh Models (UK) - vac-forms, resin and mixed resin/vac-forms
- Whirlybird including Whirlykits (UK, now owns all of the ex Maintrack masters) - resin
- White Ensign Models (UK) - resin
- Wing Factory (Japan) - multi-material
- Wings Models (USA) - vac-forms
- WK Modell (Germany) - resin
- Woddy Joe (Japan) - wood and metal
- Youfeng Model (China) - resin
- Z Model (Japan) - resin

== Unknown format ==
Please move these to the relevant section(s) above.

- 3D Hobby Shop
- Ace Hobby
- Anna*Co.
- Arsenal (Russia)
- Asian Craft Model Airplanes (Philippines)
- Berkeley Models
- Campbells Custom Kits
- Can Vac
- Dark Dream Studio
- DiWings Aeromodelismo (Argentina)
- Dyna-Flytes
- Eagle Tree Systems
- Easy Built Models
- Extreme Flight
- Flight of Cottonwood
- FlyModel
- FlyteLine Models
- Hobby
- Leoman, reformed, used formers' masters, maker "The Other Guys" series, Soviet subjects
- Long (in Africa, & Prosper)
- Mahogany Wings Corp (Philippines)
- Minicopter (German)
- The Model Airplane
- Model Airplane Factory
- Modelworks Direct
- Model Factory
- Mountain Models
- Mugi twinwall polypropylene aircraft
- Old Planes
- Paperwarbirds
- Pilot R/C
- RC Factory Czech
- Risesoon
- Schabak
- SIG Manufacturing
- Sterling
- Stevens AeroModel USA
- Stinson Aircraft
- Telink (Czech Republic)
- Tough Jets
- Twisted Hobbys
- Veyron Models
- Warplanes
- Western Models
- Williamshaven
- Wooden Scale Models (Philippines)

== See also ==
- List of scale model kit manufacturers
