= List of scale model kit manufacturers =

This list is arranged by the main material of manufacture.

Where a manufacturer has produced different kits in different materials, they are duplicated under each material.

== Polystyrene ==
=== Injection-moulded (high pressure) ===
- Academy Plastic Model (Korea)
- Accurate Miniatures (USA)
- Ace (Ukraine)
- Ace Corporation (Korea)
- Addar (USA)
- Admiral (Czech Republic) - brand of AZ Model
- AFV Club (Taiwan)
- Aim Fan Model (Ukraine)
- Airfix (UK)
- AK Interactive (Spain)
- Alanger (Russia)
- Alan Hobby (Russia)
- AMT (USA)
- Amusing Hobby (Japan)
- Aoshima Bunka Kyozai (Japan)
- Arii (Japan)
- Ark Models (Russia)
- Arma Hobby (Poland)
- Arsenal Model Group (Ukraine)
- Art Model (Ukraine)
- Asuka Model (Japan) - former Tasca
- Atlantis Models (USA)
- Aurora Plastics Corporation (USA)
- AvantGarde Model Kits [AMK], (Macau with subsidiary in UK)
- AVD Models (Russia)
- Avis (Ukraine)
- Bandai (Japan)
- Balaton Model (Hungary)
- Beemax Model Kit. (Macau, China)
- Belkits (Belgium)
- Big Planes Kits (Ukraine)
- Bílek (Czech Republic)
- Black Label (China) - Brand of Dragon Models
- Border Models (China)
- Bronco Models (Hong Kong)
- Caesar Miniatures (Taiwan)
- Cavico (M.I.Molde co., ltd.) (Japan)
- C.C.Lee (China)
- Clear Prop! (Ukraine)
- Condor (Ukraine)
- Cooperativa (Russia)
- Copper State Models (Latvia)
- Crown (Japan)
- Cyber Hobby (China) - Brand of Dragon Models
- Czech Model (Czech Republic)
- Daco Plast (Russia)
- Davric (Tony Brown Models) (UK)
- Delta 2 (Italy) - former Delta
- Dora Wings (Ukraine)
- Doyusha (Japan)
- Dragon Models Limited (Hong Kong)
- Dream Model (China)
- Eaglewall (Dorking Foundry Ltd) (UK)
- Eastern Express (Russia)
- Ebbro (MMP co., ltd.) (Japan)
- Eduard (Czech Republic)
- Emhar (UK)
- E-Model (China)
- Encore E Models (USA)
- ESCI/ESCI-ERTL (Italy/USA) - stopped production due to bankruptcy, moulds bought by Italeri and others
- Faller (Germany)
- Fine Molds (Japan)
- FinMilModels (Finland)
- First To Fight (Poland)
- Flagman (Russia)
- Flametoys (Japan)
- FlyHawk Model (China)
- Foresight (Japan)
- Freedom Model Kits (Taiwan)
- Frog (UK) (1955–1976)
- Fujimi Mokei (Japan)
- Games Workshop (Warhammer 40,000 etc.) (UK)
- Gaspatch Models (Greece)
- Gecko Models (Hong Kong)
- Gallery Models (USA) - brand of Model Rectifier Corporation
- Glencoe Models (USA)
- Good Smile Company (Japan)
- Gowland & Gowland (USA)
- Great Wall Hobby (China) - brand of Lion Roar
- GSI Creos (Japan) - former Gunze Sangyo
- Hasegawa (Japan)
- HäT (USA)
- Hawk (USA)
- Hehexing (China)
- Heller SA (France)
- HK Models (Hong Kong)
- HMA Garage (Japan)
- Hobby Boss (China)
- Hobbycraft (Canada)
- Hobby Japan (Japan)
- Huma Modell (Germany)
- Humbrol (UK) - Airfix/Heller partnership to build models with common sprues paints and glues, brand kept by Airfix for paints and glues
- IBG Models (Poland)
- ICM Holding (Ukraine)
- Ideal Toy Company (USA)
- Ilovekit (China)
- Imai Kagaku (Japan)
- Imex Model (USA)
- Imperial Hobby Productions (USA)
- Italeri (Italy)
- Jo-Han (USA)
- Kaiyodo (Japan)
- Kawai (Japan)
- Kinetic (Hong Kong)
- Kiel Kraft (UK)
- Kitty Hawk Models (China)
- Kleeware (UK/USA)
- Kotobukiya (Japan)
- KP Models (Czech Republic)
- Life-Like (USA)
- Lincoln International (Hong Kong, UK)
- Lindberg Models (USA)
- Lion Roar (China)
- LS (Japan)
- Maco (Germany)
- Magic Factory (China) - weapon platforms, ships and spaceships. Trade name of YiFang Fun (Shenzhen) Technology Co., Ltd. Started 2021.
- Marusan (Japan)
- Master Model (VEB PLasticart in new boxings) (East Germany, after 1989 Germany)
- Master Box (Ukraine)
- Matchbox (UK/Germany) - stopped production due to bankruptcy, moulds bought by Revell Germany and others
- Max Factory (Japan)
- Meng Model (China)
- Merit (J & L Randall Ltd) (UK)
- Merit International (China)
- Micro Ace (Japan) - former Arii
- MiniArt (Ukraine)
- Minicraft (USA)
- Miniwing (Czech Republic)
- Mirage Hobby (Poland)
- Mirror Models (Ireland)
- Mitsuwa Model (Japan)
- Model Products Corporation (MPC) (USA)
- Modelcollect (China)
- Modelcraft (Canada)
- Modelex (Argentina) - Mix of own and former Heller moulds
- Modelkasten (Japan) - brand of Artbox
- Modelsvit (Ukraine)
- Moebius Models (USA)
- Monochrome (Japan) - brand of Interallied
- Monogram (USA)
- Monti System (Ukraine) - brand of Seva
- Mr. Hobby (Japan) - brand of GSI Creos
- MSD Model (Russia)
- Nagano (Japan)
- Nichimo (Japan)
- Nihon Plastic (Japan)
- Nitto Kagaku (Japan)
- Novo - old Frog kits made in the Soviet Union (1971-)
- Nu-Bee (VEB Plasticart in new boxings) (East Germany)
- Nunu (Macau, China)
- Occidental Réplicas (Portugal) - Brand of a plastic plant for home products, that started to build models that were used or in use by the Portuguese armed forces current and past, age of discovery ships naus caravelles etc., spitfire Fiat G-91 fighters and T-6 Texan, and so on, sold several sprues molds to Revell and Italeri for several kits.
- Otaki (Japan)
- Orange Cat Industry (China)
- Pacific Coast Models (USA)
- Panda Hobby (Hong Kong)
- Paramount (UK)
- Palmer Plastics (USA)
- Peco (Pritchard Patent Product Co) (UK)
- Pegasus Hobbies (USA)
- Pilot-Replicas (Sweden)
- Pit-Road (Japan)
- Plásticos Lodela S.A. (Mexico)
- Plastic Soldier (UK)
- Platz (Japan)
- Playfix (VEB-Plasticart re-boxings) (East Germany, after 1989 Germany)
- Plum (Japan)
- PM Model (Turkey)
- Preiser (Germany)
- Protar (Italy)
- PST (Belarus)
- Pyro Plastics Corporation (USA)
- Ratio (UK)
- Renwal (USA)
- Revell (USA/Germany)
- Riich Models (China)
- Roden (Ukraine)
- ROKR (China)
- Rosebud Kitmaster (UK)
- Rosso (Japan)
- Rubicon Models (UK)
- R.V.Aircraft (Czech Republic)
- Ryefield Model (Hong Kong)
- Salvinos JR Models (USA)
- Sankyo Mokei (Japan)
- Sanwa Plastic (Japan)
- Scalecraft (Middlesex Toy Industries Ltd) (UK)
- Skilcraft (USA)
- Skunkmodels (Hong Kong)
- Směr (Czech Republic)
- S-Model (China)
- Special Hobby (Czech Republic) - former MPM
- Starfix (Israel)
- Strombecker (USA)
- Sunny International (Japan)
- Supermodel (Italy)
- Suyata (Hong Kong)
- Sweet (Japan)
- Takom (Hong Kong)
- Tamiya Corporation (Japan)
- Tan Model (Turkey)
- Tarangs (Sweden)
- Tauro Model (Italy)
- Testor Corporation (USA)
- Tiger Model (Hong Kong)
- Thunder Model (China)
- Tokyo Marui (Japan)
- Tomytec (Japan)
- Toxso Model (China)
- Tri-ang - marketing name of Lines Bros in France for Frog.
- Trimaster (Japan)
- Tristar (Hong Kong)
- Trumpeter (Macaw, China)
- Tsukuda Hobby (Japan)
- Unimodel (Ukraine)
- Union Model (Japan)
- Varney (USA)
- VEB Plasticart (East Germany)
- Very Fire (China)
- Vespid Models (China)
- Vision Models (Taiwan)
- Vulcan (Dorking Foundry Ltd) (UK)
- Vulcan Scale Models (Hong Kong)
- Wako (Japan)
- Waltersons (Hong Kong)
- Wave Corporation (Japan)
- Williams Bros. (USA)
- Wills Finecast (UK)
- Wingsy Kits (Ukraine)
- Wingnut Wings (New Zealand)
- Xact Scale Models (Hong Kong)
- Xuntong Model (China)
- Yamashita Hobby (Japan)
- Zoukei Mura (Japan) - subsidiary of Volks
- ZTS Plastyk (Poland)
- Zvezda (Russia)

=== Injection-moulded ("short-run" low pressure) ===
- 12 Squad (USA)
- Amodel (Ukraine)
- Armory (Ukraine)
- Aviation USK (USA)
- AVI Models (Czech Republic)
- AZ Model (Czech Republic)
- Azur (Czech Republic/France) - Brand of Special Hobby
- Brengun (Czech Republic)
- Eduard (Czech Republic)
- Fonderie Miniatures (France)
- F-RSIN (France)
- Fly Models (Czech Republic)
- Griffon Model (Japan)
- High Planes Models (Australia/Singapore) - Australian Company moved to Singapore after sale. Aircraft kits and accessories.
- JAYS Model Kits (New Zealand) Aircraft Kits mostly formerly Ventura.
- Kiwi Wings(New Zealand) - Aircraft Kits part of JAYS Model Kits
- Kora Models (Czech Republic)
- Legato (Czech Republic) - brand of AZ Model
- Leoman (USA)
- Mach2 (France)
- Maquette (Russia)
- Mark I. Models (Czech Republic)
- Merlin Model (UK)
- Military Wheels (Ukraine)
- Mikromir (Ukraine)
- Modelsvit (Ukraine)
- MPM production s.r.o. (Czech Republic)
- Olimp Model (Ukraine)
- OzMods Scale Models (Australia)
- Pavla Models (Czech Republic)
- Pegasus (UK)
- Roden (Ukraine)
- RS Models (Czech Republic)
- Skif (Ukraine)
- Sova-M (Ukraine)
- Special Hobby (Czech Republic)
- Sword (Czech Republic)
- Tasman Models (New Zealand) - Aircraft Kits part of JAYS Model Kits
- Valom (Czech Republic)
- Ventura Models (New Zealand) - Taken over by JAYS Model Kits.

=== Vacuum formed ===
- Airmodel (Germany)
- Broplan (Poland)
- Combat Models (US)
- Contrail (England)
- Dinavector (Japan)
- Dubena (Czechoslovakia)
- Execuform (US)
- Formaplane (UK)
- General Products (Japan)
- Gerald J. Elliott (England)
- MiniArt (Ukraine)
- Modakit (England)
- ModelsPark (Latvia)
- OzMods Scale Models (Australia)
- PSC (Czechoslovakia)
- Rareplanes (UK) (1969–2000)
- Sanger (UK)

== Resin cast ==
- A&W Models (Japan)
- Accurate Armour (UK)
- Aerobonus (Czech Republic) - brand of Aires
- Aires (Czech Republic)
- Airmodel (Germany)
- Akatombo Works (Japan)
- Aki Products (Japan)
- Anigrand Craftswork (Hong Kong)
- Arlo-Micromodel (Portugal)
- Baxmod (mainly South African subjects)
- B-Club (Japan) - brand of Bandai
- Black Cat Models (France)
- Blue Ridge Models (USA)
- Choroszy Modelbud (Poland)
- Classic Warships (USA) - ceased model production but publishing continues
- CMK (Czech Master Kit) (Czech Republic) - brand of Special Hobby
- Combrig Models (Russia)
- Czech Master Resin (CMR) (Czech Republic) - brand of Special Hobby
- Fantastic Plastic Models (USA)
- Grand System Models - gundam model kits (China)
- Gumka Miniatures (Japan)
- Kombinat (Poland)
- Modeler's (Japan) - brand of Interallied
- Model Factory Hiro (Japan)
- Olimp (ProResin)
- OzMods Scale Models (Australia)
- ParryArt (Australia)
- Quickboost (Czech Republic) - brand of Aires
- Planet Models (Czech Republic) - brand of Special Hobby
- Reskit (Ukraine)
- Rising Sun Modeling (Japan) - brand of Konishi
- Silver Wings (Poland)
- Studio 27 (Japan) - brand by Gilles
- Three Inches Under (USA)
- Tori Factory (Korea) - former Zlpla
- Triglav Model (Slovenia)
- Unicraft Models (Ukraine)
- Unlimited Air Models (Japan)
- Ushimodel (Japan)
- Verlinden Productions (Belgium/USA)
- Wave Corporation (Japan)
- Wheelliant (Czech Republic) - brand of Aires

== Metal ==
=== White metal cast ===
- Branchlines (Great Britain)
- DJH Models (Great Britain)
- N & C Keyser (K's Models) (Great Britain)
- Nu-Cast (Great Britain) - now operated jointly by SouthEastern Finecast and Branchlines
- Southeastern Finecast (Great Britain) - from 2000, now part of Squires Tools
- Stephen Poole kits (Great Britain)
- Wills Finecast (Great Britain) - up to 2000

=== Photo-etched / turned metal ===
- Aber (Poland)
- Aerobase (Japan)
- AKA Model (China)
- Eduard (Czech Republic)
- Gold Medal Models (USA)
- L'Arsenal (France)
- Master Model (Poland)
- Toms Modelworks + White Ensign Models (USA)

== Wood ==
- Amati (Italy)
- Artisania Latina (Spain)
- Billing Boats (Denmark)
- Corel (Italy)
- Caldercraft (U.K.)
- Campbell Scale Models (USA)
- Guillow (USA)
- MACO MODELS CO.(USA)
- OcCre (Spain)
- Kolderstok (The Netherlands)
- Scale Decks (USA)
- Scientific (USA)
- Sterling Models (USA)
- Vanguard Models (U.K.)
- Woody Joe (Japan)

== Card ==
- FlyModel (Poland)
- GPM (Poland)
- Halinski (Poland)
- JSC (Poland)
- ModelArt (Bulgaria)
- Modelik (Poland)
- Schreiber-Bogen (Germany)
- Williamshaven

== 3D-printed ==
- 3D Model Parts (USA)
- Black Cat Models (France)
- Classic Airships (USA)
- FCModeltrend (Spain)
- ION Model] Figures for warships(Poland)
- Kokoda Trail Models (Australia)
- Micro Master (New Zealand)
- Model Monkey (USA)
- NUMODEL (USA)
- One Man Model (Japan)
- Quinta Studio (Russia)
- Tecnikit (Spain)

== Mixed materials ==
- ARLO-Micromodels (former - Fabrica de construções ARLO - Porto-Portugal, established in 1939 by Arnaldo Luizello da Rocha-Brito)
- Bluejacket Shipcrafters (USA)
- Combrig Models (Russia)
- Eduard (Czech Republic)
- Flagship Models (USA)
- Fleetscale (UK)
- JetMads - resin cast and 3D printed (Turkey)
- John R. Haynes (UK)
- Frog (1931–1949) - flying and static models. See also Injection-moulded polystyrene (high pressure).
- Pocher (UK)
- Pontos Model (South Korea)
- Revival Deutschland (Italy/Germany)
- Skybirds - wood and metal
- Southern Cross Models (Australia)
- The Scale Shipyard (USA)
- Veteran Made Models (Australia)

== Unknown ==
Please move these to the relevant section(s) above.

- ARV
- Flite Test
- Gallery
- Rebell Hobby (Sweden)

== See also ==
- List of model aircraft manufacturers
- List of model car brands

== Bibliography ==
- Scale Aircraft Modelling, Guideline, January 2013
- Plastic Model & Tool Catalog 2015 , Magazine Daichi, April 2015
- Lune, Peter van. "FROG Penguin plastic scale model kits 1936 - 1950". Zwolle, The Netherlands, 2017, published by author ISBN 978-90-9030180-8
