= Varney Scale Models =

- Type: Private
- Industry: Toys and hobbies
- Founded: 1936
- Founder: Gordon Varney
- Defunct: 1960
- Headquarters: Chicago, Illinois, United States
- Products: Model trains and accessories

Varney Scale Models was founded in 1936 by Gordon Varney, an early pioneer in manufacturing HO scale model trains. The development of a reliable 6-volt motor made it possible to produce model locomotives capable of pulling long trains. The company relocated from Chicago, Illinois, to Miami, Florida, in 1955. Varney sold his company to Sol Kramer in 1960, which became the basis for launching his own line of Life-Like Trains in 1970. Varney models were above average in quality and detail and are still quite popular with collectors and model railroad enthusiasts.

== History ==
The company was founded by Gordon Varney in 1936. Varney's main significance to the model railroad community was his early advocacy of the HO scale and the development of a reliable motor small enough to power the locomotives of this gauge.

Gordon Varney played a crucial part in bringing the hobby to the smaller size and offering those with less space an opportunity to enjoy model railroading at its fullest. Varney's V-1 motor was the beginning of his HO endeavor. It was small enough to place in an HO scale loco, with enough power to pull a long train. The motors ran on 6 volts direct current, like most designs of that day.

Varney first offered the 4-6-2 Pacific and the 2-8-0 Consolidation in the late 1930s and early 1940s. The first HO scale model trains were just emerging as a viable commercial product when these steam locomotive models made their appearance. The Pacific had the USRA boiler style and was patterned after the Southern Pacific prototype. The Consolidation was designed after the Reading 2-8-0. Soon the 2-8-2 Mikado followed, and the other models were also added to the line.

One of the most popular HO Scale models of all time was the Varney model of the B&O Railroad C-16 0-4-0T Switcher, nicknamed Li’l Joe, by Gordon Varney in advertising copy, a locomotive that reportedly sold more than 50,000 copies.

For many years, the Varney advertisement occupied the back cover of Model Railroader, the most popular hobby magazine at the time, often using photographs taken by John Allen, the most famous Model Railroader.

== Vehicle Models ==
Varney was also a leader in producing accessories, the most popular of which were miniature Ford vehicles. In 1954, Varney created a 1 1/4" model of the 1953 Ford Customline Fordor Sedan. With moveable wheels and incredible detailing, the accuracy was the result of the use of the AMT Corporation's 1/25-scale Customline, which was used as a master. Released at the same time were a 1949 Ford F-1 pickup truck, panel truck and stake truck, all pantographed off 1/32-scale models made by National Products. The stake truck was later modified so it could be assembled as a van or a flatbed. A 1953 Studebaker Starliner (also spawned by AMT) soon joined the Ford line-up. Originally offered in gray, red and black, in 1956 they offered these same models molded in clear styrene, allowing the really detail-oriented hobbyist to paint the vehicles and have clear plastic window glass.

== Sale and legacy ==
Varney relocated the company to Miami, Florida, in 1955. Some of the steam locomotives previously developed by Varney were acquired by Penn Line Manufacturing, which itself was later acquired by Bowser Manufacturing. In 1960, Gordon Varney sold his company to Sol Kramer of Life-Like Products. Gordon Varney died in 1965. Model trains continued to be produced under the Varney name until March 1970, when the branding was changed to "Life-Like." Gordon Varney was named a "Pioneer of Model Railroading" by the Model Railroad Industry Association (now the Hobby Manufacturers Association) in 1985.
