= DJH =

DJH can refer to

- Danish School of Journalism (Danish: Danmarks Journalisthøjskole)
- Degrassi Junior High, a Canadian teen drama television series
- DJH Models, a British manufacturer of scale model kits
- German Youth Hostel Association (German: Deutsches Jugendherbergswerk)
- Jebel Ali Seaplane Base, United Arab Emirates (IATA code: DJH)
