= Pennsylvania Line (disambiguation) =

Pennsylvania Line was a line infantry from Pennsylvania during the American Revolutionary War.

Pennsylvania Line may also refer to:

- Penn Line, a commuter train line in Maryland
- Penn Line Manufacturing
- Frederick and Pennsylvania Line Railroad Company

== See also ==
- Pennsylvania Avenue Line (disambiguation)
- Philadelphia Main Line (PA Main Line), a collection of suburbs of Philadelphia
