= PacMin Studios =

Model aircraft manufacturer

Pacmin Studios
- Native name: Pacific Miniatures
- Industry: model aircraft marketing
- Founded: 1946, Alhambra, California
- Headquarters: Fullerton, California
- Owner: Fred Ouweleen

Pacmin Studios (Pacific Miniatures, PacMin) is an aviation marketing studio and manufacturer of model aircraft.

== History ==
Pacmin Studios (originally named Pacific Miniatures) was founded in 1946 by two employees of Douglas Aircraft Company. Orval Coker and Don Meeker. Their first projects included cutaway models of commercial airliners being promoted by Boeing and Douglas Aircraft.

These models showed the interior of aircraft to convey the luxury and comfort of air travel when a small percentage of the population had experienced airline travel. The company occupied a modest manufacturing facility in Alhambra, California, a Los Angeles suburb and began producing models of all types and sizes.

In 1986, Pacific Miniatures was purchased by Fred Ouweleen. In 1995, the company relocated to Fullerton, California. where it currently operates from a state-of-the-art facility with manufacturing operations in Tijuana, Mexico and Shenzen, China.

Pacific Miniatures was referred to as PacMin by its customers and this name was officially adopted in the 1980s. Today it is branded as Pacmin Studios to reflect the specialized work it does with desktop and larger exhibit models as well as full scale prototypes and CGI.

While best known for aviation models, Pacmin Studios has also engineered and produced projects for companies around the world in other industries such as automotive, space, and entertainment.

In 2018, Pacmin Studios launched The Model Shop, a retail site offering officially licensed models for public purchase using the same processes and materials as the models supplied to airlines and aerospace manufacturers.

== Products and services ==
The company's core offering is design and manufacture of high-fidelity scale model aircraft, which are produced in various common scales such as 1:100 and 1:200, as well as large scale models in scales such as 1:20. PacMin produces both detailed desktop models and large-scale exhibit models, including full-scale prototypes and cutaway display models that reveal intricate interior details for promotional and educational purposes. These cutaway and exhibit models can feature working components such as lighting, detailed cabin interiors, and custom paint finishes, making them effective tools for aircraft marketing and product launches.

== See also ==
- List of model aircraft manufacturers
