= Bullmark =

Toy Company

- Native name: ブルマァク
- Type: Private
- Industry: Toys
- Founded: 1969
- Founder: Saburo Ishizuki
- Defunct: 1977
- Products: Soft-vinyl toys; Die-cast toys

Bullmark (ブルマァク) is a Japanese toy company that is most famous for selling PVC kaiju character toys in the 1960s and 1970s. Founded in 1969 after the bankruptcy of pioneering toy manufacturer Marusan, the company was also known simply as Bull by many people as their logo of a bull was stamped on the bottoms of the feet of many of its toys.

== Products ==
Bullmark's vinyl Godzilla and Ultraman toys are extremely popular among Japanese toy collectors; some currently retail for thousands of dollars. Bullmark's vinyl toys were produced in a variety of sizes from "mini" (3-4") to "standard" (8-9") to "giant," (usually 12" or more) with smaller runs produced with different colorways for export to Hawaii and the West Coast of the United States. These so-called "Hawaiian" versions of the characters, which were produced in relatively small numbers, feature brighter colors than their Japanese counterparts, and therefore are popular among collectors both in Japan and abroad.

When the fad for soft-vinyl monsters began to fade in the mid-1970s, despite gimmicks such as sparker figures and magnets embedded in their palms (each of which included a tin friction-motor car), Bullmark began re-thinking the concept and released a series of soft-vinyl toys containing missile launchers, and other play gimmicks. These were sold under the brand "Mecha Machine," among other names.

In an attempt to compete in a changing toy marketplace, in 1973 Bullmark also branched out into die-cast toys, which were sold under the brand name of "Zinclon." Perhaps most famous among these are a small line of diecast metal renditions of characters from the Godzilla films. Bullmark co-founder Saburo Ishizuki explained in the afterword to the book Super #1 Robot that the diecast Mechagodzilla toy was "so popular that I could hardly keep up with demand... [so] I updated the look of the [other] monster characters with more robotic appearances and incorporated all-new action features." The Zinclon series would eventually incorporate a variety of giant robot characters as well as monsters.

Bullmark closed shop in 1977. The same year, Saburo Ishizuki took Bullmark's sales and marketing subsidiary Ark and turned it into a full-fledged toy manufacturer in its own right. During the 1990s, Ishizuki assisted the Japanese toy manufacturers M-1 (M-Ichigo) and Bandai in producing licensed reissues of many classic Bullmark vinyl toys, which proved to be exceedingly popular, from both the Godzilla and Ultraman lines.

Ishizuki officially revived the brand as an independent company once again, with manufacturing and consulting support from Yuji Nishimura of M-1, in 2009.

== See also ==
- Chogokin
- Godaikin
