= Ark Diecast =

Japanese toy company

Ark
- Type: Subsidiary
- Industry: Entertainment
- Headquarters: Japan
- Key people: Saburo Ishizuki
- Products: Die-cast robot toys
- Brands: Arklon
- Parent: Bullmark (?–1977)

Ark was a Japanese company that produced a series of die-cast metal monster and robot toys sold under the brand name "Arklon". It was founded as a sales and marketing subsidiary of famed Japanese toy manufacturer Bullmark. After Bullmark's bankruptcy in 1977, Bullmark co-founder Saburo Ishizuki took charge of Ark and turned it into a full-fledged toy manufacturer. Ark released a variety of toys during the mid-to-late 1970s, including die-cast, soft vinyl, and inexpensive plastic toys. The Arklon toys were imported to the United States by the Marukai Trading Company.

With one exception, King Kong (sold under the generic name "Mech-Gorilla" in the USA), all of the Arklon toys were based upon kaiju characters from the Ultraman television series. The unique designs, which Ishizuki has described as "my attempt to create character toys that could be enjoyed even by those unfamiliar with the given film or television series", have made them favorites among Japanese toy collectors.

== Toy line ==
- King Joe (from Ultra Seven) - King Joe, one of Ultra Seven's popular foes, was the first character to be represented in toy form by Ark. The toy was released in two editions, one with show-accurate colors, and another far more colorful design. The latter was the only version released in the United States, whereas both versions were released in Japan.
- Mecha Baltan Seijin (from Ultraman) - The name is a misnomer, both because it is one of the more organic-looking of the Ark designs, and because the toy is an inaccurate rendering of the Baltan of the original Ultraman series.
- Mecha Black King (from Return of Ultraman) - Features a notoriously fragile waist joint. The head sculpt has attracted some praise. This toy was nicknamed "Yojimbo-Kaiju", meaning roughly "Bodyguard Monster"; the nickname derives from his role in Return of Ultraman, where Black King acted as a bodyguard to Nakuru Seijin).
- Mecha Red King (from Ultraman) - Based on one of Ultraman's famous foes, Red King. Though similar to Mecha Black King, the two toys share very few actual pieces. Red King was nicknamed "Skull Monster".
- Mecha Gomora (from Ultraman) - One of the most esoteric portrayals of an Ultraman character in Ark's lineup, Gomora's hands are shovel-like scoops, his neck can extend a great length, and the toy includes a spring-powered car that can launch from Gomora's chest.
- King Kong- Based on the famous film monster King Kong, this toy features a pair of spring-loaded "knives" that emerge from its nipples, a cardboard plane that can be launched from its stomach, and a ball-and-chain accessory. The King Kong toy was released in the United States under the name "Mech-Gorilla", so as to avoid the high costs of officially licensing the King Kong character.
