= Wm. K. Walthers =

Model railroading company

Wm. K. Walthers, Inc.
- Company type: Private
- Industry: Toys and hobbies
- Founded: 1932
- Founder: Bill Walthers
- Headquarters: Milwaukee, Wisconsin, United States
- Products: Model trains and accessories
- Website: www.walthers.com

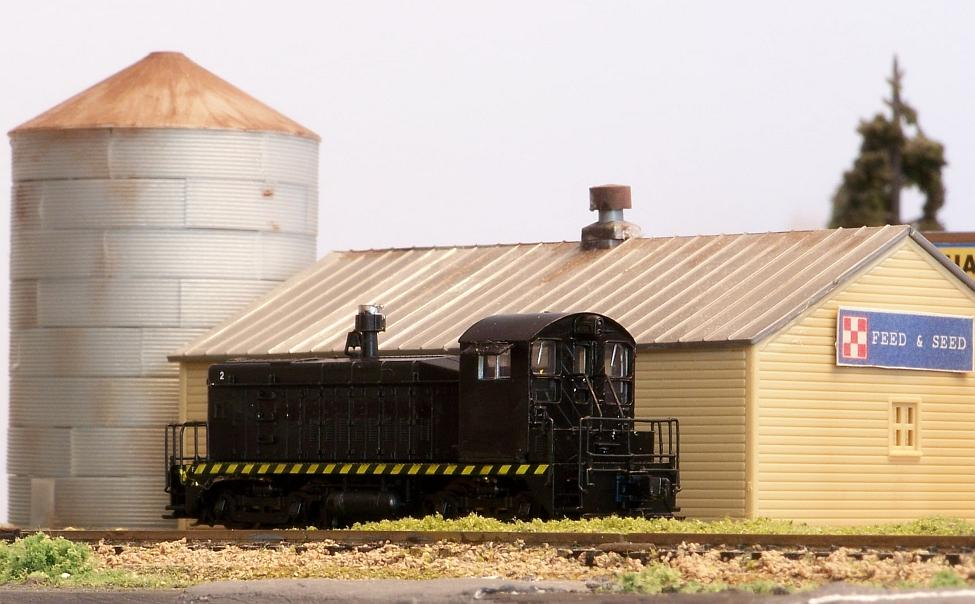
An SW8 made by Walther's division, Life-Like

Wm. K. Walthers, Inc. is a manufacturer and distributor of model railroad supplies and tools.

== Overview ==
Wm. K. Walthers, Inc., was officially founded in Milwaukee in 1932—though it started years earlier when seven-year-old William K. (Bill) Walthers got his first taste of the hobby with a small, wind-up toy train for Christmas. He continued with the hobby and eventually had an attic layout composed primarily of his scratch-built creations. A series of articles he wrote on building train control and signaling systems led to requests from other modelers that he began manufacturing them. The first ad (in the May issue of The Model Maker) offered a 24-page, 15¢ catalog that listed rail, couplers, and electrical supplies. Sales were over US$500.00 for the first year. By 1935, the catalogs were over 80 pages.

Within five years, Walthers had grown and a larger quarters were needed. Space was found on Erie Street, where everything—from milled wood parts to metal castings to decals—was made in-house. 1937 also saw a new line in HO Scale, featured in its catalog. Bill brought operating layouts to the 1939 World's Fair, which gave the hobby a big boost. Soon, though, the growing possibility of war overshadowed these successes.

In 1958, Bill retired, and his son Bruce took over. Just as full-size railroads were being hard-hit by new technology, so too were model railroads. In 1960, Walthers became a full-line distributor of other manufacturers' products while continuing the expansion of the Walthers lines. By the start of the 1970s Bruce's son Phil had joined the company.

== Walthers History ==
Expansion and diversification continue under Phil's tenure. The establishment of the Walthers Importing Division added several international lines. The company made agreements with several European companies to become the exclusive North American distributor for many famous European brands.

The manufacturing plant was modernized. Code 83 track was introduced in 1985, giving layouts more realistic proportions.
In 1990, the Cornerstone Series buildings were unveiled. Combining a freight car with a related industry, the Cornerstone Series makes it possible for modelers to duplicate authentic operations, enhancing layout realism.
The Train Line Deluxe Sets and locomotives debuted in 1994. These sets feature the detailing of serious models and an affordable price—allowing newcomers to get started, and then build on to their first set, rather than replacing it.

In 2005, Walthers purchased Life-Like from Lifoam Industries. With this purchase, Walthers acquired the Proto Lines that have become the backbone of their locomotive and rolling stock segments. The Proto 2000 line allowed Walthers to start offering its full passenger train subscription sets with all in-house products. These sets have become some of Walthers' most recognized marketing tools and have recently been adopted by several of their competitors.

In recent years, changes in American retailing have hit the hobby industry particularly hard. Some blamed companies like Walthers that have become increasingly vertically integrated for putting many of the small suppliers and Local Hobby Shops out of business. However, the retail trends were more the result of the evolution of mail-order into online retailing and less from direct marketing by distributors. The large distributors like Walthers started online shopping sites more as a response to large internet retailers bypassing traditional distribution chains. Walthers has made efforts to protect their network of small local retailers by using MSRP on most products on their websites, which allows the small retailers to remain price competitive.

On July 16–18, 2010, Walthers was part of Milwaukee's celebration of the National Train Show, presented by the National Model Railroad Association (NMRA) which was founded in Milwaukee in 1935.

== Walthers Products ==
Walthers sells both its products as well as products from over 200 other manufacturers including buildings, people, scenery, locomotives, and rolling stock on multiple scales. Walthers is considered one of the largest manufacturers, distributors, and retailers of passenger cars from the 1930s to the present.

Walthers product lines include:

- WalthersProto is the highest quality and price tier for locomotives and rolling stock. It became part of Walthers with its acquisition of Life-Like in 2005, including its Proto 2000 product line.
- WalthersMainline is the middle tier balancing quality and price for locomotives and rolling stock. It was the original product line from Walthers.
- WalthersTrainline is the starter and lowest cost tier for locomotives and rolling stock. It is targeted at children and cost-sensitive beginners.
- WalthersTrack offers HO scale track in sizes Code 83 and Code 100.
- Walthers Cornerstone provides buildings and accessories for all product lines and scales. This was an original Walthers product line launched in 1990.
- Walthers SceneMaster offers scenery, lighting, figures, loads, vehicles, and other details like shipping containers to build a realistic model railroad.
- WalthersN offers locomotives and rolling stock in N scale.
- Walthers Controls offers electrical controls and wires for DC train layouts. It does not offer Digital Command Control equipment from its product line, but only through partner products.
- Walthers Tools & Screws offers drills, taps, fasteners, screws, nuts, lubricants, and other utilities to build model railroads.
