= Pennsylvania Avenue Line =

Pennsylvania Avenue Line can refer to the following transit lines:

- Pennsylvania Avenue Line (Baltimore), Maryland, United States, now the Route 7 bus
- Pennsylvania Avenue Line (Washington, D.C.), United States, now the Route 30 bus

== See also ==
- Pennsylvania Line (disambiguation)
