= Bowser Manufacturing =

American manufacturing company

- Type: Private
- Industry: Toys and hobbies
- Founded: 1946
- Founder: Bill Bowser
- Headquarters: Montoursville, Pennsylvania, United States
- Products: Model trains and accessories

Bowser Manufacturing is a United States manufacturer of model railroad equipment, located in Montoursville, Pennsylvania. Founded in 1946 by Bill Bowser in Redlands, California, he used his skill as a machinist to design and produce one of the first lines of accurately scaled steam locomotive kits in HO scale. In 1955, his financial partner Donald Acheson forced Bowser out of the company by enforcing a buyout clause in their agreement. After Acheson sold the considerable backstock of kits and parts, he sold the company to Lewis English in 1961. The company has since grown and continues to produce its own line of injection molded plastic model kits and ready-to-run locomotives.

== California Years (1946-1961) ==
Bill Sheldon Bowser was born in Hancock, Ohio, in 1914. In 1944 he was a machinist working for the Naval Ordinance Plant in Indianapolis, Indiana. Bowser's friend George Hockaday asked if he was able to produce some hobby parts for him in HO scale, since they were in short supply due to wartime rationing. Sparking his interest, he acquired the inventory of spare parts from a company called Knapp that was producing a popular steam locomotive kit. Bowser paid off a debt owed by Knapp to Superior Casting, and the inventory of parts was released. Upon further inspection, Bowser discovered that many of the key parts were not made to scale and suffered from manufacturing defects. In 1946 Bowser relocated his family to California to launch his model railroad manufacturing business.

Bowser acquired additional machinery, as well as the molds to produce the Knapp steam locomotive, before he relocated from Indiana to California. Unable to find a suitable facility, Bowser purchased land and began constructing a small factory in Redlands. His redesigned steam locomotive kit was still in production, so Bowser accepted manufacturing contracts to produce everything from rocket nozzles to parts for toy guns. In the meantime, considerable time and money were spent on developing finely detailed brass castings for his model steam locomotive kit. After the contractor hired to produce the castings quit, Bowser discovered the wrong type of plaster has been used to make the masters, which created poor quality parts.

While Bowser had solved the production issue, he did not have enough funds to begin manufacturing his steam locomotive kit. Donald Acheson became Bowser's silent partner providing enough working capital to put the model kit into production. The first ads for Bowser's 4-8-2 Mountain HO scale steam locomotive kit appeared in Model Railroader in 1948. Though the kit was now available for purchase, design flaws were discovered in the electric motor used to power the model. Bowser redesigned the motor from scratch, calling this new design the "Supermotor."

The decision to sell through distributors instead of direct sales to consumers further hurt Bowser's financial position. Nonetheless, a new 4-6-2 Pacific based on New York Central Railroad class K-11 locomotives was put into production. Learning from the Mountain project, many parts were cast from zamac instead of brass, lowering cost and since parts could be produced in automated die-casting machines. The new K-11 Pacific locomotive kit was brought to market in 1951, and introduced many improvements over the previous offering.

Despite sales being hurt by postwar inflation and a general economic downturn, Bowser went ahead with design and production of his most ambitious project to date. Working from actual Union Pacific Railroad blueprints with the aid of an early mechanical calculator, Bowser recreated the 4-6-6-4 Challenger in HO scale. The end result was an accurate model that set Bowser apart from other manufacturers of the day. Unfortunately, the manufacturing issues encountered over the last few years had depleted the company's finances and Bowser was forced to accept additional contract work to pay for production of the Challenger.

After the contract ended and the Challenger was in production, Acheson chose to force out Bill Bowser's portion of the partnership. Bowser's personal finances were nearly depleted, and he was unable to match Acheson's buyout offer, forcing him to leave the company in 1955. Since the factory was in full production at the time of Bill Bowser's ouster, Acheson was able to stockpile a considerable number of kits to sell over the next few years.

Bill Bowser established Bowser Precision Products in 1955, and earned lucrative contracts that he fulfilled initially by leasing back his old factory from Acheson. After a successful engineering career spanning many years he retired to Arizona. He was inducted into the Model Railroad Industry Association (now the Hobby Manufacturers Association) Hall of Fame in 2003. Bowser died on December 11, 2009.

== Move to Pennsylvania ==
Since 1961 the company has been owned by the English family and located in Pennsylvania. The assets of Penn Line Manufacturing were purchased as a bankruptcy sale in 1963, which included the tooling and parts inventory for several steam locomotive models based on Pennsylvania Railroad designs. In 1965 the English family moved the company to Mountoursville, Pennsylvania, and focused full-time on model production. Soon after, Pennsylvania Scale Models' owner Felix Bass sold his company to English, adding several models of electric trolleys to the Bowser line. In 1975, sons Lewis English, Jr., and Lee K. English joined the company.

In 1985, Bowser acquired Cal Scale from John Anderson and Harry Parker of Fresno, California, which added thousands of lost-wax brass steam locomotive detail parts. Don Stromberg sold Cary Locomotive Works to Bowser in 1988, which added several cast-metal diesel and steam locomotive bodies to the growing catalog. The old Menzies line of freight car kits was acquired from D.J. Baker Co. in 1990. Around the same time, Bowser added a paint booth and pad printing machine to their manufacturing facility. Bowser purchased Arbor Models in 1991. Expansion into N scale came in 1999 with the purchase of Delaware Valley Car Company. In 2004, Bowser acquired Stewart Hobbies from Steve Stewart.

Lew English, Sr., died on February 3, 2012.

The company produces model railroad locomotives, railroad cars, kits and a wide selection of parts directed at the more serious model railroad enthusiast. Bowser's significance for the model railroad community lies not only in the products that Bowser itself originated, but also in those originally produced by other companies. The latter includes products originally made by Penn Line Manufacturing, Varney, Cary and Pittman motors.
