= Berkeley Models =

American toy company

Berkeley Models, Inc.
- Type: Privately owned
- Industry: Toys and hobbies
- Founded: 1933 (93 years ago) in Brooklyn, New York City, New York, United States
- Founder: William L. "Bill" Effinger Jr.
- Fate: Defunct, 1962 (64 years ago)
- Successor: Fox Manufacturing
- Headquarters: West Hempstead, New York, United States
- Key people: William L. "Bill" Effinger, president
- Products: Model airplane kits

Berkeley Models, Inc. was an American company that manufactured model-airplane kits that pioneered such firsts as the nation's first gas model plane kit, and which became one of the industry's leading companies.

Founded in the Brooklyn borough of New York City, New York, and later based in West Hempstead, New York, it lasted from 1933 to 1962. Its founder, Bill Effinger, was elected to the Academy of Model Aeronautics Hall of Fame in 1986.

== History ==
William L. "Bill" Effinger Jr., founded Berkeley Models in a three-car garage in Brooklyn in 1933 to help support himself through engineering school. The following year he produced his company's first rubber-powered model-airplane kits, the Consolidated Fleetster and the Fokker triplane, and the year afterward introduced the first gas-powered model-airplane kit, the Buccaneer.

The company, whose name came from the address of his family's home, 53 Berkeley Place, began advertising with classified ads in Universal Model Airplane News, initiating display ads in March 1934; by November 1935 he was advertising six kits in his "Master Models" series of scale-design kits with 20-inch wingspans. In 1936 came the Cavalier kit, with a nine-foot wingspan.

Effinger made the company his full-time career upon graduating with a mechanical engineering degree from Brooklyn Polytechnic Institute in 1938. He went on to earn a degree in aeronautical engineering from the Massachusetts Institute of Technology, and in 1943 volunteered for the U.S. Navy. Stationed in the Pacific theater of World War II, he rebuilt damaged airplanes and served at Guadalcanal and at a naval base in Pensacola, Florida. From 1943 to 1945 while serving in the Navy, Effinger left the company day-to-day operations to James F. Barry Jr. (1911-1999) who had been hired as a head foreman in 1935.

"Bill Berkeley" advertising mascot

Sometime after 1945, Effinger moved Berkeley to a manufacturing facility and headquarters on Railroad Avenue in West Hempstead on Long Island and became one of the industry's major companies, with 100 of its 150 models introduced through the years still in production as of 1957.

Accelerating in popularity after the war, Berkeley Models by 1952 claimed to be sold through 85 distributors and 4,500 dealers. That year the company created the advertising mascot "Bill Berkeley" for ads in Model & Hobby Industry magazine and elsewhere. In 1957, Effinger estimated his company had by then produced two million kits. His designers included Henry Struck, Dr. Walt Good, Don McGovern, Woody Blanchard, Benny Shereshaw (designer of the Custom Cavalier kit), Paul Plecan (designer of the Minnow), Dick Korda (designer of the Powerhouse), and Stan Hill. Circa 1957, comic-book artist Don Heck, the future co-creator of Iron Man, spent a year drawing model-airplane views for Berkeley.

At the turn of the decade, Berkeley went bankrupt and was absorbed by model-airplane engine maker Fox Manufacturing, based in Fort Smith, Arkansas. Its owner, Duke Fox, recalled,

In 1959, the Berkley Company was in deep financial trouble. In an effort to save something out of an impending bankruptcy, Bill Effinger persuaded me to buy the company out of Chapter 11 bankruptcy. ... All of the Berkley inventory was loaded up and shipped to Fort Smith, and installed in a nearby building that I had built. I put Bill Effinger on salary to run the business. Bill and I got along quite well, and I think that the thing might have worked had I just put it in storage for a couple of years and then gradually picked it up. But I was persuaded that continuity was important, and I found that the wholesalers were so overloaded with Berkley kits that it would be years before the kits were sold and they would be in a position to buy more. After six months I was beginning to suspect that this wasn't going to work, and after nine months I was sure. Effinger found himself another job, and I went about gradually liquidating the kit business (which took several years).

The brand name continued until June 1962; beginning the following month, Fox advertised kits under the Fox name. Afterward, part of the kit line was picked up by a company called Sig. Effinger went on to become project engineer for the A. C. Gilbert Company and died in 1999.

In 1986, in nominating Effinger to the Academy of Model Aeronautics Hall of Fame, then-executive director John Worth described Berkeley Models as "probably the most prolific producer of model kits, at least in terms of numbers of different kits produced, numbers of designs of kits and sheer volume of products advertised. Bill was one of the real modeling pioneers and promoter of model aviation."

== See also ==
- List of model aircraft manufacturers
- List of New York companies
