= Pyro Plastics Corporation =

Manufacturer

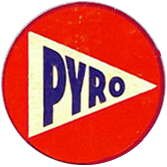
- Founded: 1939
- Founder: William Lester
- Defunct: 1972; 54 years ago
- Fate: Sold to Life-Like in 1972
- Headquarters: Union Township, NJ, U.S.
- Products: Plastic model cars, motorcycles, aircraft, ships, military vehicles, animal and human figures

The Pyro Plastics Corporation was an American manufacturing company based in Union Township, NJ and popular during the 1950s and 1960s that produced toys and plastic model kits. Some of the scale models manufactured and commercialised by Pyro were cars, motorcycles, aircraft, ships, and military vehicles, and animal and human figures.

The company ceased activities after being sold to Life-Like in 1972.

== History ==
The company was founded in 1939 by William M. "Bill" Lester (1908-2005) and his first wife, Betty L (Lubarsky). Rapidly establishing itself as a “leading contractor of custom-made parts and products in plastic” Pyro employed the injection molding method for forming plastic shapes, which Lester had perfected in the early 1930s. During World War II, the company manufactured parts for military use, including aircraft components.

After the war, Pyro turned its attention to toys and promotional items. In the late 1940s, the company began to produce toy "clicker pistols", and eventually became one of the leading manufacturers of military toys during the Korean War period. The public’s interest in space soon led the company to offer a number of space-themed toys including conceptual rocket ships and the "Pyrotomic disintegrator" ray gun in 1953, which became extremely popular.

From the mid-1950s, Pyro manufactured scale model kits covering a wide range of subjects. These included cars, motorcycles, aircraft, military vehicles, replica historic firearms, and animal and human figures such as dinosaurs, and anatomical and educational models. Innovative when first introduced, Pyro kits featured two-part mirror-molded sectional bodies, hulls, gun-barrels or fuselages which would be assembled horizontally. This design allowed mold-makers to offer multiple variations of some subjects, requiring only minor modification to the master mold. However, by the mid-to-late 1960s, this type of tooling had been rendered obsolete by the side slide molding process innovated by George Toteff, first at AMT and later at MPC which allowed manufacturers to produce one-piece car bodies with crisply detailed engraving.

Pyro developed license agreements with other model and toy companies beginning in the late 1950s, loaning out some of its molds, while, in turn, reboxing kits by other manufacturers under the Pyro label. (This is a common practice among model makers, even today.) A partial list of companies sharing molds with Pyro include: Life-Like, Lionel Trains, Eagle, Inpact, Otaki, and Palmer Plastics (which Pyro acquired in 1970).

Lester sold the company in 1972, partly in order to pursue his interest in the development of tamper-proof packaging. Pyro was sold to Life-Like, which, along with Palmer Plastics, had already re-boxed a number of Pyro kits under license. (These early re-boxings often shared Pyro kit numbers as well as original box art lithography and instruction sheets). Exact details of the sale were never publicly disclosed. Eventually, the Pyro toolings were acquired by Lindberg Products, Inc., and were re-issued with new box art many times, well into the early 2000s. (Lindberg subsequently became part of J. Lloyd International, which was, in turn sold to Round2 LLC of South Bend, Indiana in 2013).

== Product lines ==
=== Military toys ===
Pyro was the leading manufacturer of military "bin toys" in the early 1950s. Bin toys were relatively inexpensive items, usually an assortment of miniature green-plastic "army men", vehicles or accessories, packaged in poly bags, wholesaled in bulk, and sold "grab-bag-style" from large cardboard bins in retail stores. Pyro produced a vast array of toys for this market, including tanks, trucks, jeeps, amphibious vehicles, aircraft and field equipment. The company also offered some of these same products in more elaborate gift sets, featuring generous assortments with beautifully lithographed box art. (Examples: 6 US Army Mobile Units (#243); 21-piece US Army Set; 2 Army Tanks and 2 Army Jets set; US Army Tow Truck and Road Roller). Lionel Trains offered some of its freight cars with Pyro military trucks and tanks.

Pyro took some of the same molds from its military trucks to offer civilian versions, often in brightly colored plastic. Other vehicles included a car hauler with a load of autos; road building equipment, and vintage racing cars with driver figures.

=== Space-themed toys ===
In the early 1950s, capitalizing on the public's growing interest in science fiction in comic books, movies and early television, Pyro produced a series of space-themed toys. Most notable of these were the 'X-400 Space Explorer' (a conceptual spaceship, highly futuristic in appearance) and, in 1953, the "Pyrotomic disintegrator", a colorful, crisply-molded "ray gun" with working trigger and barrel action. Both pistol and rifle versions were available, and later versions of the toy were molded in genre-appropriate metallic colors. The Pyrotomic disintegrator became one of the company's most successful toys.

== Model kits ==
=== Ships ===
Pyro was a prolific and well-known manufacturer of ship models. Alan Bussie of oldmodelkits.com, who has done extensive research into the company's history, notes that the molds for Pyro’s very first assembly kits, a series of warships in “box scale”, were cut either in 1952 or 1953. These were the USS Missouri (kit #146); USS Chicago (#147); USS Shangri-La (#148), and USS Sumner (#149). With the success of these kits, Pyro quickly followed with a series of small sailing vessels: Mayflower (#168); Barbary Pirate (#169); USS Constitution (#170), and Santa Maria (#171); this second series included plastic hulls, wooden masts and vacuum-formed sails.

In 1963 the original box scale sailing ships were re-issued with all-plastic parts, and the line was expanded to include the Golden Hind, the Bon Homme Richard, and the Brig of War American Privateer. Kits retailed from between 49 and 75 cents each. By 1967 the series had grown to include sixteen different subjects, notably: HMS Victory, Roman Merchant Ship and Spanish Galleon. In addition to the Historic Sailing Ships Series (1963-'67), Pyro's Table Top Navy series of 1/1200 ships (circa 1963) were re-boxings of kits from Eagle Models; these kits could be built full-hull or waterline and were often used in wargaming.

From the late 1950s on, Pyro released a steady stream of larger ship models, though exact scales were never indicated on the boxes. By 1967, nearly thirty had been listed in the catalog. Never grouped together in a specific name-series, these kits included a diverse array of subjects from antiquity to modern times, famous warships from the Age of Sail to humble contemporary working vessels. One of the most notable examples was the Robert E. Lee Mississippi steamboat (model which, when completed, measured 21.5 inches long). Attesting to the popularity of these kits, the company offered an electric motor unit for ship models, an accessory which allowed builders to adapt the larger-scale static models for operation on water.

Pyro was equally active in the tooling of full-hull intermediate-scale ship kits, listing twelve in its 1967 catalog. Retailing at $1.00 to $1.25, these kits proved quite popular, and included the Cutty Sark, HMS Bounty, USS Constellation, Chinese War Junk, Gloucester Fisherman, and English Revenge.

=== Historic firearms ===
One of the company’s most unusual and interesting undertakings was its series of large-scale-to-full-size replicas of historic firearms. The first kits in this series were re-issued from Revell, but later, Pyro developed its own models Examples of this product line include the Colt 45 Peacekeeper (1:1 scale); Kentucky Long Rifle and Western Saddle Rifle; Buccaneer and Privateer guns; Dutch Flintlock Pistol (1/6 scale); and the Miquelet Moorish lock pistol. These kits were also re-boxed by Life-Like under license from Pyro before 1972.

=== Aircraft ===
Beginning in 1955, Pyro made molds for three aircraft kits in approximate 1/32 scale. These were the Thompson Trophy Racers; the Gee Bee Sportster, Laird Turner Pesco, and Hall Springfield Bulldog. These kits were issued in both static and motorized versions, but disappeared from the catalog after 1960. Other aircraft kits sold under the Pyro label after 1960 were re-issues from Inpact Models.

=== Educational ===
Between 1958 and 1960, Pyro introduced a series of educational “activity” kits; Design-a-Car (kit #361), Design-a-House (#362); Design-a-Plane, and Design-a-House Master. The Design-a-House kit included a large selection of generic architectural elements such as inner stud walls, door frames and windows. The Design-a-Car and Design-a-Plane kits featured the Design-a-matic, a slide-rule-like “computer” which, according to company literature had been “validated by Remington Rand Univac Division of Sperry Rand”.

Pyro also sold a handful of architectural models, anatomical subjects such as The Human Eye, The Human Heart, The Human Ear, The Human Lung, The Human Nose and Mouth, and Man Anatomy Model (not to be confused with the much more famous and successful Visible Man from Renwal); 1/8 scale figures; Indian Warrior, Indian Chief, Medicine Man, Rawhide Cowpuncher, Restless Gun Deputy Sheriff, Wyatt Earp, and Neanderthal Man. Dinosaurs appeared in the “Science Series” (later re-boxed as the Prehistoric Monsters series). Bird models included Bald Eagle, Mallard Duck, Ring-tailed Pheasant and Birds Gift set, issued in “Mark Trail” editions, and later in a special Paint-by-Number set with pallet, brush and Paint-by-Number instructions.

=== Cars ===
Pyro offered several different series of car models ranging from 1/32 to 1/6 scale.

=== Deluxe Series ===
Originally released in the mid-1950s, the company’s earliest car kits, included in its Deluxe Series, were the 1948 Lincoln Continental (original kit #227), ’37 Cord Convertible (#229), and ’35 Auborn Speedster (#231), all nominally in 1/24 scale, though careful examination reveals them to be much smaller, probably in the range of 1/27 or 1/28 scale. The original kit-box illustrations from these models were also available as "suitable for framing" posters. Pyro re-boxed these kits a number of times. The originals were issued in a clamshell-style box, but later iterations featured the company’s signature two-part hard-box packaging. These kits were subsequently re-issued several times by Lindberg, as recently as 2009.

=== Table Top Series ===
The Table Top Series of car models in 1/32 scale encompassed three distinct types of subject, offered in several different price ranges. "1/32 scale" can be something of a misnomer, as many of these models were somewhat smaller, probably closer to 1/35 scale.

Stock cars

American stock cars from the early 1930s to mid-1950s, mostly by Ford or Chevrolet. When first released around 1962, these kits retailed for 49 cents (USD). The parts were molded in a single uniform color, including wheel/tire halves, interiors, bumpers and grills. A few clear-plastic parts were included for windshields and headlamp lenses. Occasionally, a tiny decal sheet with racing numbers could be found inside the box.

All twelve subjects in the series were available in two different body styles with interchangeable fender units and underframes. Several of these multi-version subjects were released in special two-in-one kits, combining box-art lithography from the single versions. This series included: ’30 Ford Model A Woody Wagon and Pickup; ’32 Ford ‘B’ Roadster and 3-Window Coupe; ’32 Chevrolet Cabriolet and Pickup; ’34 Ford Tudor Victoria and 3-Window Coupe; ’36 Ford Roadster and 3-Window Coupe; ’37 Chevrolet Coupe and Convertible; ’40 Ford Coupe and Convertible; ’49 Ford Tudor and Convertible; ’52 Chevrolet Custom Wagon and Custom Fas-Back; ’57 Chevrolet Bel Air Hardtop and Convertible. Later, Pyro added the ’32 and ’34 Plymouth Roadsters and Four-Door Sedans. These kits featured basic engines and removable hoods. Apart from their front clip and grill, the ’34 Plymouth kits are simple unmodified iterations of the ’32 models, and bear little resemblance to the real-life prototype.

The release of the Table Top Series of American stock cars coincided with the popularity of slot car racing in the mid-1960s. Customers purchasing these kits were encouraged to send for The Sandblaster, a free illustrated instruction sheet offering tips on how to adapt the static models for use as slot car racers. Photo essays in magazines such as Model Car and Model Car Science provided detailed instructions for customizing and motorizing the kits. Today, some of the original kits and built-up models are still sought out for this purpose.

A few of the Table Top Series stock cars were re-boxed by Life-Like in the early 1970s, sometimes including plated parts such as grills and bumpers. Lindberg re-issued them several times (1978, 1980, 1986, 1993, 2000, 2006, 2008-2009). The later re-issues were molded in all-white plastic. Today the rarest and most sought-out of the original Pyro Table Top Series stock car kits are those which have never been re-issued; the '32 and '34 Plymouth Four-Door Sedans, '34 Ford Victoria, '40 Ford Coupe, and the '52 Chevrolet Custom Wagon.

Grand Prix racers

The Table Top Series also offered a selection of historic Grand Prix racers of the early 1930s in 1/32 scale, including the 1930 Bentley Blower; ’31 Alfa Romeo Grand Tourismo; Aston Martin International and Bugatti Grand Prix.

Dragsters

Yankee Doodle, Jersey Bounce, The Rebel, and The Texan.

=== Table Top Classics ===
From the mid-1960s, the Table Top Classics series included a selection of American and European luxury cars of the 1930s in approximately 1/32 scale. These kits included plated parts as well as rubber tires, sometimes with wide white sidewall inserts. Original copies of many of these kits can still be found today, though a few are quite rare and command high prices at auction. Some entries in this series were the ’32 Pierce Arrow Roadster; ’32 Chrysler LeBaron; ’32 Packard Roadster; Rolls-Royce Sedanca; ’32 Lincoln KB Sport convertible and Town Car and the Duesenberg SSJ Roadster.

=== Vintage Brass series ===
The Vintage Brass series of early (Brass-era) automobiles was introduced in the late 1960s. The series included brass-plated parts such as headlamps, grills and bell covers. Among other subjects this series included the 1909 Lozier-Briarcliff; 1909 Rolls-Royce; 1909 Cadillac Touring Car; 1911 Stevens-Duryea Tourer; 1911 Mercer Raceabout and Touring Car, and the 1915 Model T Ford Coupelet.
