= VEB Plasticart =

Mastermodell GmbH
- Formerly: Kunststoff-Verarbeitung Zschopau (1958–69); Modell-und Plastspielwaren Kombinat Annaberg-Buchholz (1969–73); VEB Plasticart Zschopau (1973–89)
- Type: Private
- Industry: Toy, collecting
- Founded: 1958
- Defunct: 1993; 33 years ago
- Fate: Fell from bankruptcy in 1993, sold to Manfred Wader which moved the factory to Elterlein, Saxony
- Headquarters: Zschopau, East Germany,
- Products: Scale model aircraft, cars. spacecraft

Mastermodell GmbH (also known as VEB Plasticart) was a plastic model and toy manufacturer established in 1958 in Zschopau, East Germany.

VEB Plasticart produced around 40 different kits and a few games (e.g. the mancala game "Badari") made of plastic. Most kits were static models and used scale 1/100 for airliners, 1/50 and later 1/72 for smaller aircraft. They also produced a model of the Soviet spaceship Vostok (scaled 1/25) and the Energia rocket with the Soviet space shuttle Buran (1/288). Many of them are today valued collector items.

== History ==
VEB Plasticart was established in 1958 in Zschopau, East Germany. VEB (Volkseigener Betrieb) was a Socialist-era designation, meaning "company owned by the people". The company was called KVZ from 1958-1969, MPKAB from 1969-1973, VEB Plasticart Zschopau from 1973-1989 and Mastermodell GmbH from 1989-1991. After a two-year break, the company was sold in 1993 by the German Treuhand (an organization which privatized state owned enterprises of the GDR) to Manfred Wader, and renamed to Plasticart. In 1993, the company had only 37 workers left. A new factory was constructed in Elterlein, Saxony, which employed over 70 workers in the following years. In 2011, the factory had to be closed down, marking the end of the Plasticart brand. In late 2012, the German company Reifra has resumed production of some of the former Plasticart model kits.

VEB Plasticart was able to sell cheap, but well designed plastic construction kits to Western countries in exchange for Western currencies.

The factory was located in August-Bebel Strasse 2, 9360 Zschopau, German Democratic Republic.

During the company's existence, its name has been changed several times.

KVZ ("VEB Kunststoff-Verarbeitung Zschopau")
This name lasted until 1969 and is translated as "Plastic Processing Zschopau". The kits had very nice packaging, usually made of thicker cardboard and a great cover image. The company logo at that time was a snake.
MPKAB ("VEB Modell -und Plastspielwaren Kombinat Annaberg-Buchholz")
This name was used from 1969-1973 and stands for "VEB model and plastic toys combine Annaberg-Buchholz". The kits of this period were packed in the classic, familiar, blue standard boxes without a company logo.
In this era the combined company released 1:87 scale die-cast car and military vehicle models. The "ESPEWE MODELLE" logo was used on the package.
VEB Kombinat Plasticart Annaberg-Buchholz
This name was used for die-cast vehicle models. The "PLASTICART modelle" logo was used on the package.
VEB Plasticart Zschopau
This was the last name to carry the "VEB" designation from 1973 to 1989. The packaging was the same as in 1969/70, but it received a company logo in 1973. From 1987, some kits appeared in a new, black box, with a picture of a constructed model on the cover.
Mastermodell GmbH
From 1989 to 1991, the kits were produced under the name of a limited company.

In addition to these company names, two more brand names were used by UK importers: "Playfix" from the mid-1980s and "Nu-Bee" from the early 1990s.

== Product lines ==
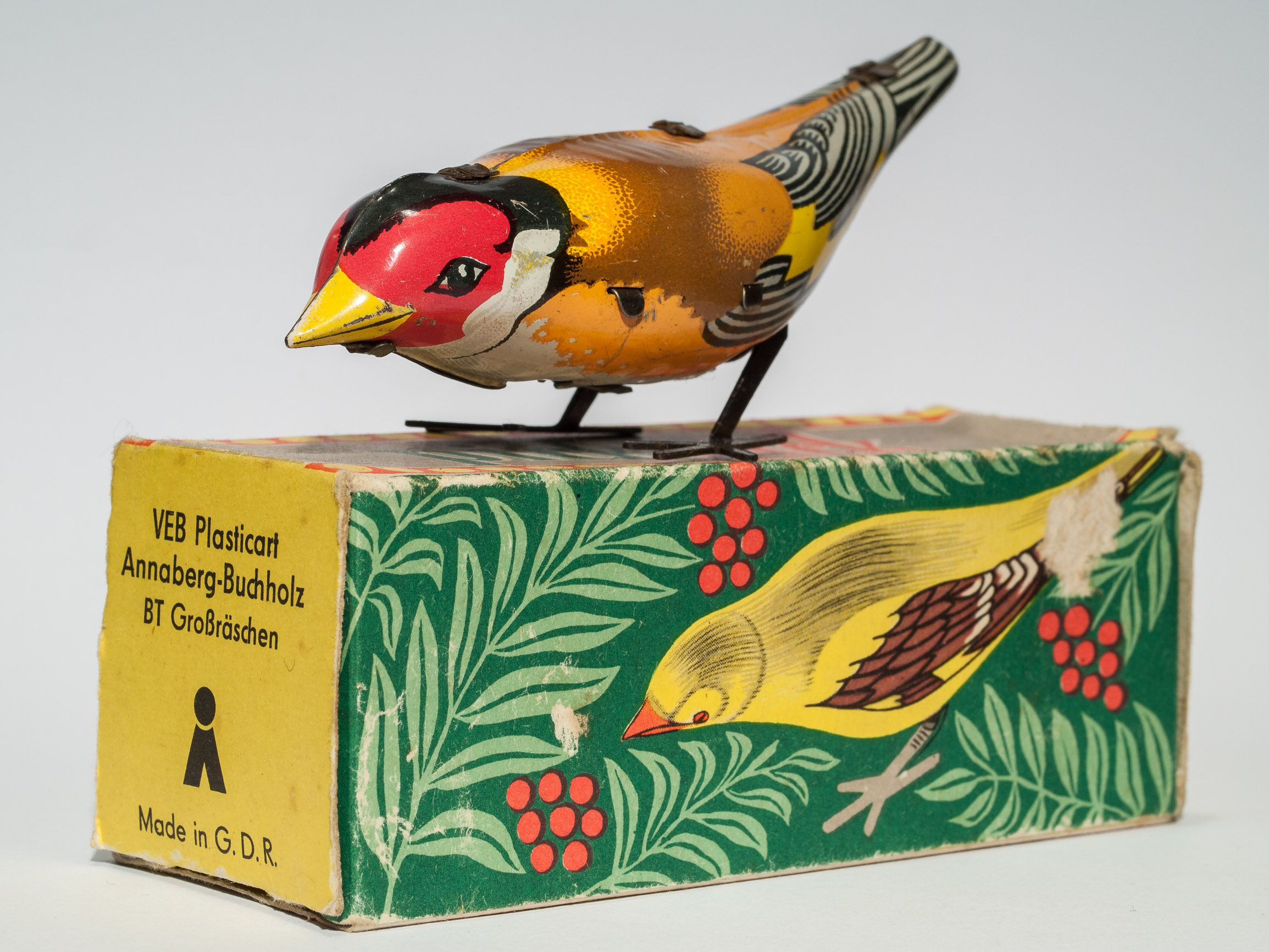
Metal wind-up bird

Starting with an Ilyushin Il-14 airliner in HO scale, following it with a 1/40th scale Aero 45 twin engine low wing monoplane, Plasticart soon produced a scale model of the Baade 152, the first jet turbine airliner to be produced by the GDR and the last development in a line of aircraft that sprung from the former Junkers works in Leipzig and Dresden (both then in the GDR). Next up was the stalwart of Interflug's European network, the four-engined Ilyushin IL-18 turboprop.

The first of the famous Soviet airliner series to appear, in 1963, was the Tupolev Tu-104, the first medium haul jet aircraft to go into regular sustained airline service. The early Plasticart Tu-104 set the standard for all the kits that followed. It was scaled at 1:100 which whilst not common for aircraft kits at the time, was close to FROG models' 1:96 scale and matched contemporary East German TT trains such as Berliner Bahn. In addition, the kit set a standard for being simple to assemble, with a minimal number of parts, sturdy landing gear and a full decal sheet. Instructions, often printed in German, Russian, Polish and Czech, were aimed squarely at consumers in the Comecon countries, where Plasticart kits were both affordable and plentiful. They included exploded diagrams, but no English instructions.

Because the drawings were easy to obtain, Plasticart began to introduce a comprehensive range of detailed models of Soviet airliners and other Warsaw Pact aircraft. Whilst the Tu-104 had only been available with Aeroflot markings, the new introductions mostly came with Interflug decals – markings of the state airline of the GDR.

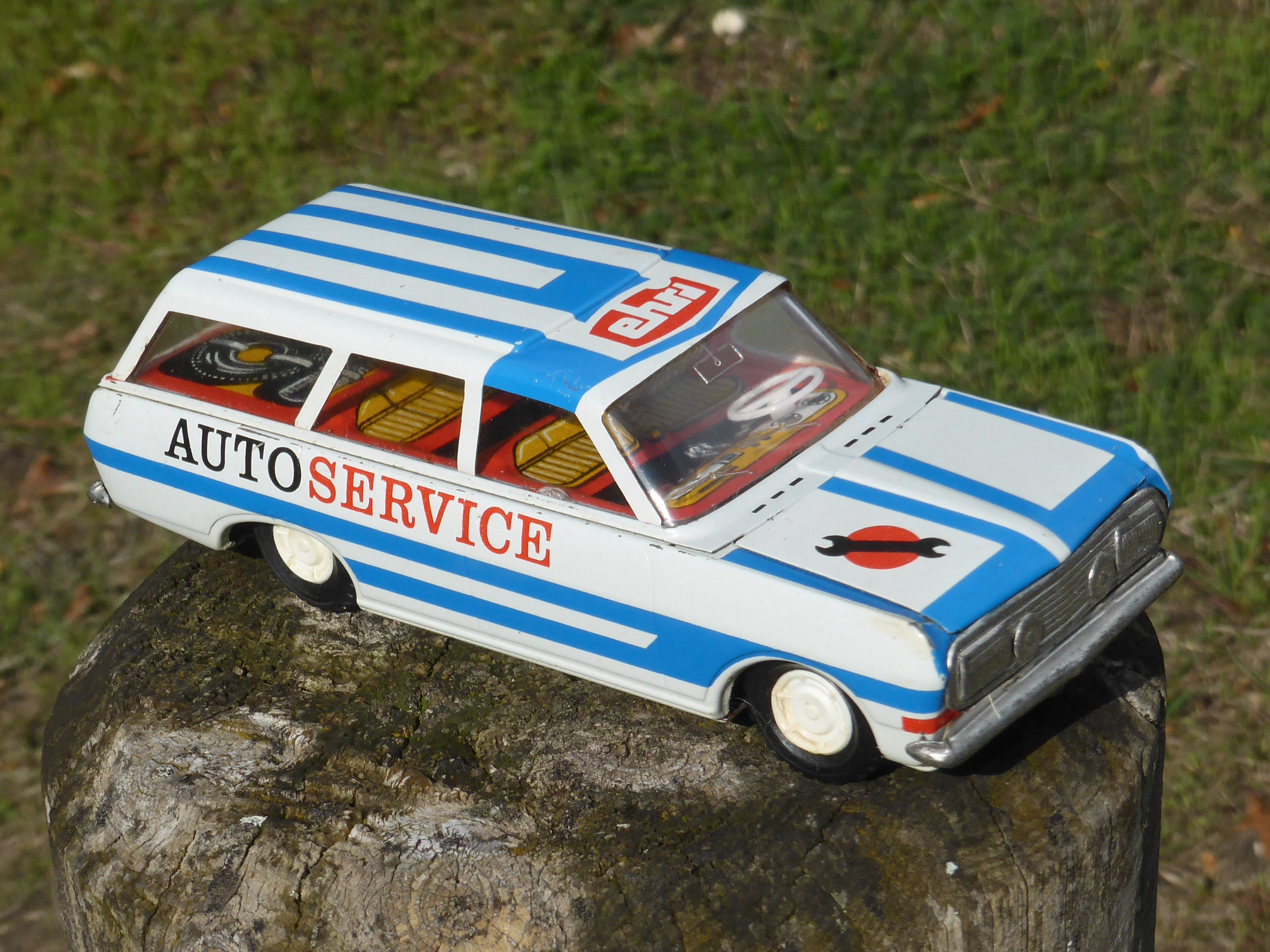
Ehri Kombi

The latest airliners soon made it into the range, including the Tupolev Tu-134, Tu-154, Ilyushin's Il-62 long range airliner, the Antonov design bureau's An-24 twin engine short hauled feeder-liner and the Czech-built Let L-410 Turbolet twin prop commuter aircraft. Later additions included the remarkable Yakovlev Yak-40 tri-jet short-haul "hot & high" jet and the Tu-144 supersonic jet, known by NATO as the Charger or popularly as "Concordski". A mix of Soviet fighter aircraft and especially, helicopters, was also produced including the giant Mil Mi-10 flying crane, the famous MiG-21 "Fishbed" (1/100) and Sukhoi Su-7 "Fitter" fighters (1/72 scale).

But it is the Western airliners that are most sought after by collectors today. The vehicle came with a very large kit of the Douglas DC-8-54 series. The DC-8 was in early KLM stripes livery and is today very sought after. It was subsequently re-issued with an updated KLM decal sheet. The box art for the De Havilland DH106 Comet 4 airliner depicted it departing from Hong Kong Kai Tak airport. Full BOAC decals are included. The SE210 Caravelle was also released in this era, in the markings of a French prototype destined for Air France. Then the Boeing 727-100 got the Plasticart treatment with box art in Pan-Am colours. Plasticart then added the Hawker Siddeley Trident initially in British European Airways colours, but later in British Airways livery, and then the unsuccessful Dassault Mercure of which only 11 units were built, all going to French domestic airline Air Inter.

Unusually, during a short period of 4 months in 1971, their Il-62 model was sold with KLM livery, to celebrate their short-lived partnership with Aeroflot for flights to Moscow. While the real life aircraft only carried the KLM logo and personnel in KLM uniforms, the model carried a full KLM livery. Due to its short production life, it is one of the rarer Plasticart-produced models.

Later models, such as the 1/72 scale Junkers G23/24 tri-motor corrugated aluminium airliner were detailed and well moulded. Western fighter jets also made an appearance with the introduction of the delta-wing Saab Draken in 1/100 to complement the MiG-21. Along with the aircraft and helicopter kits, VEB Plasticart also produced a model of the first crewed spaceship Vostok 3KA (1/25) and the Soviet Energia rocket with Buran (1/288). The Vostok kit is almost the same size as Revell's Vostok, and the box artwork is also very similar, but the two are completely different. Revell's Vostok is actually 1/24 scale and it was initially released in the late 1960s.

=== List of Plastic Models ===
==== Civil aircraft (Eastern) ====
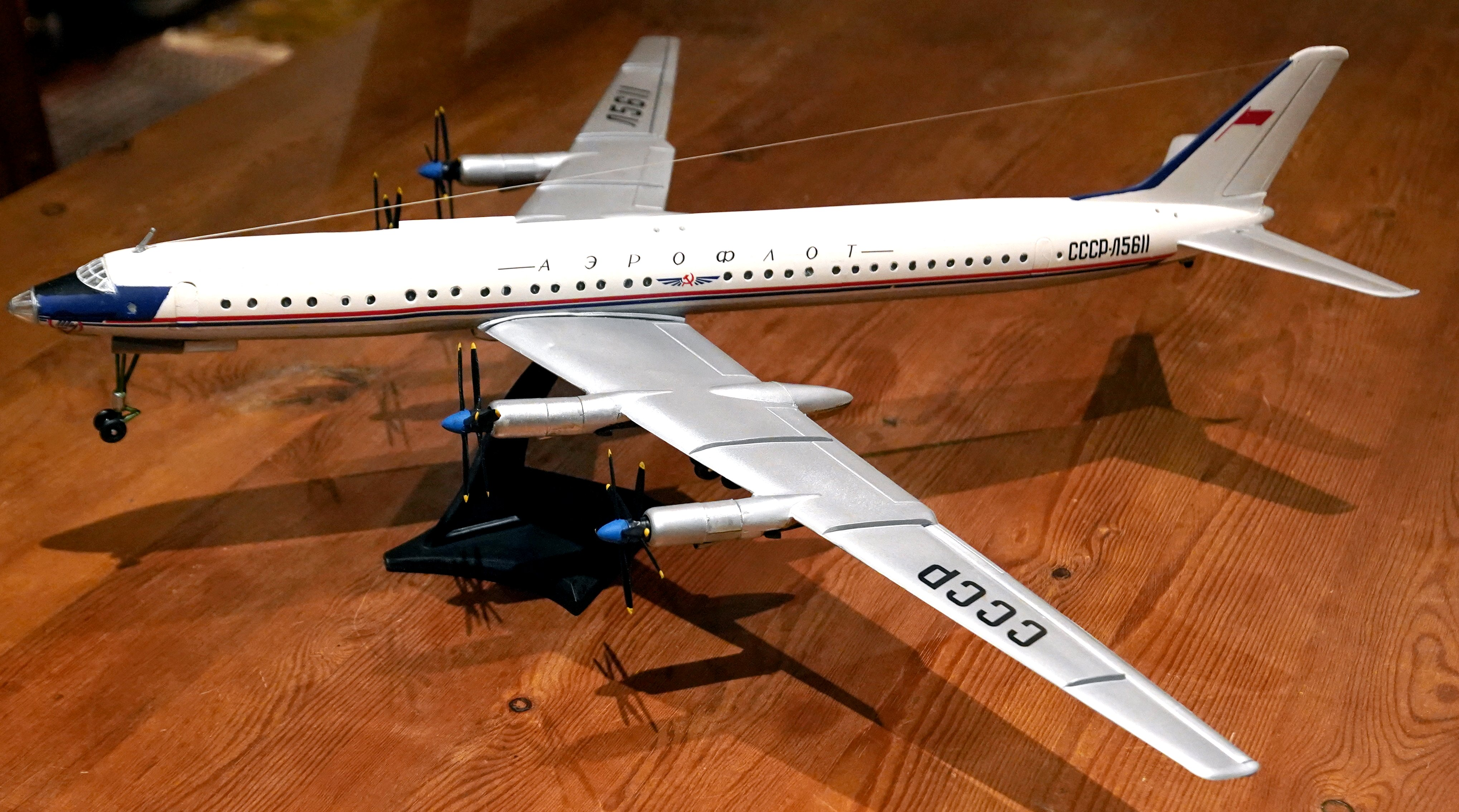
Tupolev TU-114

- Ilyushin Il-14 "Crate" (1/87) 1958
- Aero 45 (1/50) 1959
- Dresden Baade 152 (1/100) 1960
- Ilyushin Il-18 "Coot" (1/100) 1961
- Antonov An-2 "Colt" (1/75) 1962
- Antonov An-12 "Cub" (1/100) 1963
- Tupolev Tu-104 "Camel" (1/100) 1963
- Tupolev Tu-114 "Cleat" (1/100) 1963
- Tupolev Tu-134 "Crusty" (1/100) 1963
- Aero L-60 Brigadýr (1/100) 1965
- Ilyushin Il-62 "Classic" (1/100) 1965
- Yakovlev Yak-40 "Codling" (1/100) 1967
- Tupolev Tu-144 "Charger" (1/100) 1969
- Tupolev Tu-154 "Careless" (1/100) 1973
- Let L-410 Turbolet (1/100) 1975
- Antonov An-24 "Coke" (1/100) 1975
- Antonov An-14 "Clod" (1/72) 1988

==== Civil aircraft (Western) ====
- Douglas DC-8-54 (1/100) 1963
- Sud Aviation SE210 Caravelle (1/100) 1963
- de Havilland DH106 Comet-4 (1/100) 1964
- Boeing 727-100 (1/100) 1968
- Hawker-Siddeley HS121 Trident 2 (1/100) 1973
- Dassault Mercure (1/100) 1975
- Junkers G23/24 (1/72) 1987

==== Military aircraft ====
- Mikoyan-Gurevich MiG-15 "Fagot" (1/50)
- Ilyushin Il-28 "Beagle" (1/100) 1970
- Mikoyan-Gurevich MiG-21 "Fishbed" (1/100) 1973
- Saab 35 Draken (1/100) 1973
- Sukhoi Su-7 "Fitter" (1/72) 1973
- Tupolev Tu-20/95 "Bear" (1/100) 1975
- Beriev Be-6 "Madge" (1/72) 1975
- Tupolev Tu-2 "Bat" (1/72) 1977

==== Helicopters ====
- Mil Mi-1 "Hare" (1/100) 1967
- Mil Mi-4 "Hound" (1/100) 1967
- Mil Mi-6 "Hook" (1/87) 1967
- Mil Mi-10K "Harke" (1/100) 1968
- Yakovlev Yak-24P "Horse" (1/100) 1968

==== Spacecraft ====
- Vostok 3KA (1/25)
- Energia/Buran (1/288) 1988
