= Plásticos Lodela S.A. =

Mexican plastic model kit manufacturer

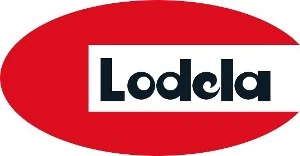

Plásticos Lodela S.A. was a Mexican plastic scale Model and toy company. It was founded on August 17, 1957 by Apolo Loóez de Lara. The company name was a contraction of his surname. It was manufacturing the Revell brand plastic models, their plastic cement, and a small line of paints for modeling. In 1975 Lodela began to manufacture the Cox brand miniature internal combustion engine toys, mainly flying Control Line model airplanes, but also some cars and helicopters. From the mid-1980s it issued also Airfix and Heller SA models. Some model kits included Lodela's original Mexican markings.

Particularly known for, but not limited to, 1:144 scale commercial airplane models, Lodela produced airplane models for many Latin American airline companies, including Viasa, Aerolíneas Argentinas, Aeroperú, Aeroméxico, Mexicana, and others. It also produced model kits for Delta, Eastern, Lufthansa, KLM, Air France and other non-Latin airlines.They were also known for their popular 1/72 scale warbird models from WW-II (and a few WW-I).

At one time during the late 1980s, Lodela also had an advertising contract with American soda brand Orange Crush, releasing some car models with the soda's logo on their model boxes.

== Litigation problems ==
From 2004 to 2012, Lodela was sued on Mexican court by Banco Nacional de Mexico.
