= Marusan Shōten =

Japanese toy company

Marusan Toys Inc.
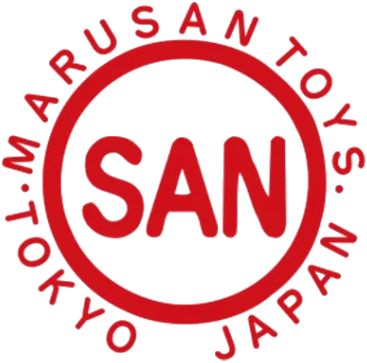
- Formerly: Marusan Shōten
- Type: Incorporated
- Industry: Entertainment
- Founded: 1947; 79 years ago
- Founder: Haruyasu Ishida; Minoru Ishida; Yasuo Arai
- Headquarters: Taitō, Japan
- Products: Plastic scale model aircraft, ships, figurines, action figures,
- Website: marusantoys.jp

Marusan Toys Inc. (マルサン) is a Japanese model and toy company. It is known as the first Japanese plastic model manufacturer and also famous for selling PVC kaiju (monster) character toys during the 1960s. Its headquarters were located in Taitō, Tokyo. The company was founded in 1947 by Haruyasu Ishida, Minoru Ishida, and Yasuo Arai. It was bankrupted in 1968, but was rebuilt the following year.

== History ==
Marusan was founded in 1947 by three relatives, Haruyasu Ishida, his brother Minoru Ishida and brother-in-law Yasuo Arai. Its business was mainly selling tin toys and optical toys. In 1950, the company was formally incorporated as "Marusan Shoten Ltd." (株式会社マルサン商店, Kabusikigaisha Marusan Shōten). Its logo was "SAN" in a circle since "maru" means circle, in Japanese.

Initially, their business was a wholesale, but they eventually began to design and produce their own toys such as celluloid dolls and tin toys. In 1953, they released the elaborate tin toy "1951 Cadillac ". It was a huge success also in the US market. In 1954 they launched the tin toy SSN submarine series and a vinyl "Mammy doll". Submarine toy could run underwater over 10m by friction motor.

In 1958, Marusan released their first plastic model kit, based on the submarine USS Nautilus. This model was recognized as the first Japanese domestic plastic model kit, though it was actually a copy of Revell's product. The following year, they started to sponsor Japanese TV program Land and Sea and Sky (陸と海と空, Riku to Umi to Sora) focused on promoting plastic model kits into the Japanese market. They called their plastic model kits "Plamodel" (プラモデル, puramoderu) and registered it as a trademark in 1959. Marusan also tied up with Revell in 1960 and sold many Revell plastic models in Japan.

In 1966, they introduced "Ultra-kaiju" PVC figures. These tough toys won children's hearts and were very successful in business. In 1967 Marusan changed their name to "Maruzan Co., Ltd."(K.K.マルザン). New logo was "san", not "zan", in a red circle. Although the reason for change of the name was for wishing development of the company, Maruzan was unexpectedly bankrupted in 1968.

After the bankruptcy of Marusan three companies were established: In 1969 Minoru Ishida rebuilt Marusan as "Marusan Co., Ltd". New logo was again "SAN" with white band in a red circle. At the same time, Koutaro Ishida, a nephew of Minoru Ishida, built a new company named "Bullmark" along with two other ex-employees of Marusan, Saburo Ishizuki and Yutaka Shibata. Bullmark produced PVC monster character toys and monster-related plastic models. And some ex-employees of Marusan built a new company named "Fuji Hobby". It took over the military plastic model kit production.

Newborn Marusan was also active in PVC toys. They created their own original monster series in 1970 and released the Ultraman Ace series mini toys in 1972. Also in plastic model kits, they released small models such as the 1:100 scale Japanese fighter series in the early 1970s. In the mid-1970s, Marusan eventually moved primarily into the OEM business of producing toys and parts for others and stopped producing original brand toys and models. In 1981, they developed small elaborate gearboxes suitable for a pullback motor, which were used for many companies' products.

Under the nostalgia boom, Marusan reproduced their original PVC monster series in 1997. Since then Marusan is continuing production of the old style toys under their own brand.

== Products lines ==
=== Plastic models ===
Marusan products included original molds, molds from other companies such as Pyro and Snap, copies of molds by other companies such as Revell, Monogram, ITC, Aurora and Lindberg. In turn, several other companies used Marusan molds. Marusan also served as the first Revell/Japan in the early 1960s, issuing many Revell kits in the regular Revell box-art with Marusan logo and Japanese language instruction added. After bankruptcy in 1968, molds were acquired by several companies such as Bullmark, Fuji Hobby, Nichimo and Doyusha. US company UPC reboxed and re-issued various Marusan kits in the late 1960s, including copy kits from Monogram, Lindberg etc. Eldon Industries also re-issued Marusan kits as "Match Kit" in the late 1960s.

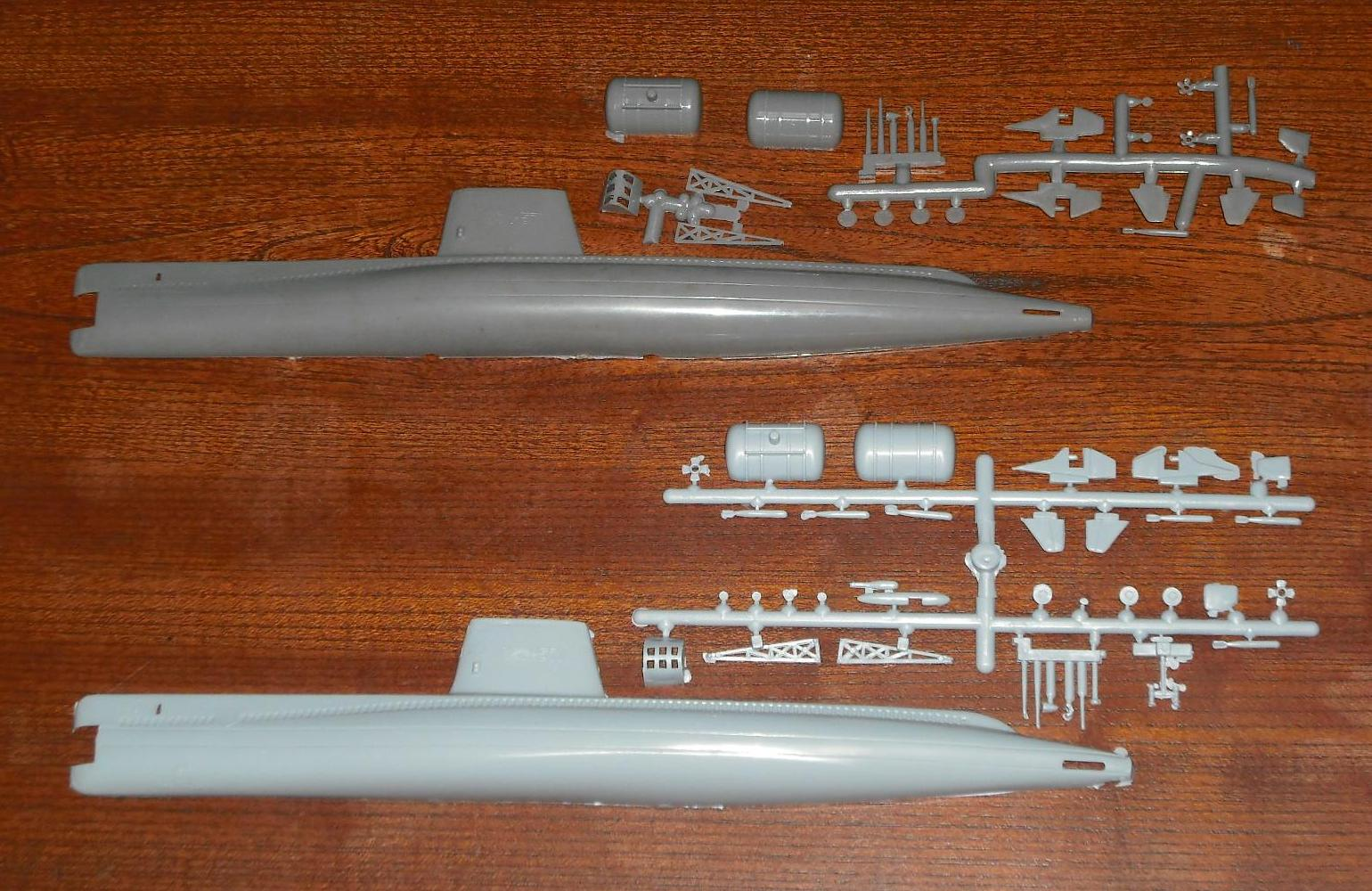
Marusan model of military submarine

- 1:100 scale aircraft series - mainly WW II era fighters, some large bombers such as B-29, and some post WW-II jet fighters such as F-86 and F-104.
- 1:50 scale aircraft series - including some fine original models such as F-86D along with copies of 1:48 scale kits of the US companies.
- Matchbox series - very small size aircraft models for children.
- Various scale aircraft - almost all were copies of other company models.
- 1:700 scale IJN Combined Fleet series - Japanese battleships, aircraft carriers and heavy cruisers.
- 1:400 scale IJN Combined Fleet series - Battleship Yamato, Musashi and carrier Shinano.
- Tallship series - Nippon Maru, Kaiwo Maru etc.
- Torpedo boat series
- Various scale boat and ship - ex-Pyro
- HO scale armored division series - copies of Roco Minitanks.
- 1:40 scale military vehicle series - ex-Snap
- Movie series - Orion from 2001: A Space Odyssey, Proteus from Fantastic Voyage, Jupiter II from Lost in Space etc.
- Figure series - Mickey Mouse, Donald Duck, Tarzan, Visible Man etc.
- Godzilla series - walking Godzilla, Baragon etc.
- Ultra Q series - walking Gomess, Pegulia etc.
- Ultraman series - Jet VTOL, walking Ultraman, Red King etc.
- Ultraseven series - Pointer, Ultra Hawk 1, Ultra Seven etc.
- Captain Ultra series

=== PVC monster toy ===
- Godzilla series
- Ultra Q series
- Ultraman series
- Ultra Seven series
- Captain Ultra series
- Kaiju Booska series

=== Tin Toys ===
Various type tin toys were produced and exported to the US and Europe in the 1950s. Walking Godzilla toy was released in 1964.

== See also ==
- Bullmark
