= Trimaster =

Trimaster was a Japanese scale model manufacturer based in Fujieda City, active from 1987 to 1991.

The company specialized exclusively in Luftwaffe aircraft in 1:48 scale, primarily rare variants and prototypes. Trimaster's kits were among the most detailed and complex of their time, featuring white metal castings, metal tubes, wires, vinyl tires, and photo-etched parts. Their prices were also extremely high for the time (US$55), which contributed to the company's closure.

Hong Kong–based Dragon acquired Trimaster's molds and reissued the kits in a simpler, more affordable format, replacing most metal components with plastic. The lettering for Dragon's "Master Series" resembles the original Trimaster logo font.

In March 2020, Dragon announced its Trimaster Collection. This series, reissued in the original box design, commemorates Trimaster's significance and its historical contributions.

== Product lines ==
- MA-1 Focke-Wulf Fw 190D-9 "Langnasen Dora"
- MA-2 Focke-Wulf Fw 190D-12
- MA-3 Heinkel He 162A-2 (with BMW 003E engine)
- MA-4 Heinkel He 162A-2 (without engine)
- MA-5 Focke-Wulf Fw 190F-8
- MA-6 Focke-Wulf Fw 190A-8
- MA-7 Focke-Wulf Fw 190A-8/R11 Nachtjäger
- MA-8 Focke-Wulf Fw 190A-8/R8 Rammjäger
- MA-9 Focke-Wulf Ta 152H-1
- MA-10 Messerschmitt Me 262A-1a/U4 (Polkzerstörer with 50mm cannon)
- MA-11 Messerschmitt Me 262A-2a/U2 (Schnellbomber with clear nose)
- MA-12 Messerschmitt Me 262A-1a/Jabo
- MA-13 Messerschmitt Me 163B-1a Komet
- MA-14 Messerschmitt Me 163S (two-seat trainer)
- MA-15 Focke-Wulf Fw 190D-12 Torpedoflugzeug
- MA-16 Messerschmitt Me 262A-1a Nachtjäger (single seat)
- MAZ6800 Focke-Wulf Ta 152C-0 (resin parts for nose and wings)
