= Accurate Miniatures =

American manufacturer of scale plastic model kits

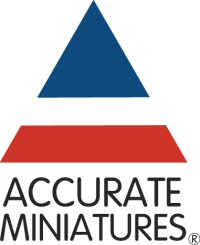
- Company type: Limited liability company
- Founded: 2003
- Headquarters: Concord, NC, United States
- Key people: Linda Habovick (President)
- Products: Plastic model kits
- Owner: Eddie Collins; John Habovick
- Parent: Collins-Habovick, LLC

Accurate Miniatures is an American manufacturer of scale plastic model kits. It is owned by Collins-Habovick, LLC and is located in Concord, North Carolina, United States. Their products primarily consist plastic model airplane kits from World War II, though they also make model kits of planes and automobiles from other eras.

== History ==
The original Accurate Miniatures was a Charlotte, North Carolina–based plastic model company that began business in the mid-1990s. They filed for bankruptcy in June 2001. Later that year, Accurate Miniatures was purchased from the original owners by Hobby Investors LLC, now called Collins-Habovick, LLC. The transfer included the sale of the company name, logo, inventory, and intellectual property. Paul Bedford, former general manager of the original Accurate Miniatures, claims the deal was part cash and part debt assumption.

In July 2001, Accurate Miniatures, in an attempt to get out of debt, prepared to sell as much as 70% of their tooling (model molds) to the Bologna, Italy–based Italeri. Some of the molds included molds for the Avenger, Dauntless, Grumman F3F, Mustang, Stormovik, and Yak kits. However, the sale to Hobby Investors LLC nullified this deal.

Unseen to Collins-Habovick was the financial disaster left by the previous management. When the previous management ceased operation, substantial debt remained behind. Mold sets like the B-25 and F-3F were not paid off completely, and mold commitments for the NASCAR stock car, SB2U, and an R-4 were not funded at all even though a fair amount of tooling had been complete. All of this (not including unpaid artists, printers, and many others) had to be overcome before anything else could be achieved.

Only through the diligent work and patience of the small staff was Accurate Miniatures able to be resurrected to become a successful company that is praised by model builders for their high-quality kits and attention to detail.

== Product lines ==
=== Aircraft ===
Accurate Miniatures produces model kits of these airplanes:

==== 1:48 Scale ====
- Bell P-39Q Airacobra
- Bell P-400 Airacobra
- Bristol Beaufighter NF.I Nightfighter
- Bristol Beaufighter VIc
- Bristol Beaufighter TF.X
- Curtiss SB2C-1C Helldiver
- Curtiss SB2C-4E Helldiver
- Douglas SBD-1 Dauntless
- Douglas SBD-2 Dauntless
- Douglas SBD-3 Dauntless
- Douglas SBD-4 Dauntless
- Douglas SBD-5 Dauntless
- Focke-Wulf Fw 190A-8
- Goodyear F2G Corsair
- Grumman F3F-1
- Grumman F3F-2
- Grumman Gulfhawk II
- Grumman TBM-3 Avenger
- Grumman TBF-1C Avenger
- Ilyushin Il-2M3 Shturmovik
- Yakovlev Yak-1
- North American A-36A Apache
- North American B-25B Mitchell (Doolittle Raider)
- North American B-25C/D Mitchell
- North American B-25G Mitchell
- North American Mustang Mk.Ia
- North American F-6A Mustang
- North American P-51A Mustang
- North American P-51C Mustang
- North American P-51D Mustang
- Republic P-47D-5-RE Thunderbolt
- Vought SB2U-1 Vindicator
- Vought SB2U-2 Vindicator
- Vought SB2U-3 Vindicator

==== 1:72 Scale ====
- Boeing F4B-4
- Curtiss P-6E Hawk
- Curtiss P-40N Warhawk
- General Atomics RQ-1 Predator
- McDonnell-Douglas F-4C/D Phantom II
- McDonnell-Douglas F-4J Phantom II
- North American P-51B Mustang

==== 1:100 Scale ====
- Bell AH-1G Cobra
- Bell UH-1B Huey
- Boeing AH-64 Apache
- Messerschmitt Bf 109F
- North American P-51D Mustang
- Sikorsky HH-60 Nighthawk
- Sikorsky SH-60B Seahawk
- Sikorsky UH-60 Black Hawk
- Supermarine Spitfire Mk. Vb

=== Automobiles ===
Accurate Miniatures produced model kits of these automobiles:

==== 1:24 Scale ====
- Corvette Grand Sport
- McLaren M8B (3 versions)

=== Miscellaneous ===
- 1/24 scale model automobile wheels
- 1/48 scale model aircraft decals and accessories
