= Penn Line Manufacturing =

- Industry: Model railroad manufacturing
- Founded: 1947; 79 years ago
- Founders: Albert M. Mercer; K. Linwood Stauffer; Robert Faust
- Defunct: 1963
- Fate: Bankruptcy
- Headquarters: Boyertown, Pennsylvania, USA

Penn Line Manufacturing was a United States manufacturer of model railroad equipment, produced in Boyertown, Pennsylvania.

== History ==
The company was founded in 1947 by Albert M. Mercer, K. Linwood Stauffer and Robert Faust, hobbyists who believed that most of the model railroad equipment produced at that time lacked realism. Japan and Germany produced few due to the recently ended World War II, while the main United States train model brands at that time, Lionel Corp. and American Flyer, did not put as much authentic detail on their trains as their O and S gauges would have allowed.

Penn Line's early contribution to model railroading was the use of printer's lead to cast the locomotives. This allowed very fine detail in the castings, much greater detail than could be achieved from stampings. And while the larger O gauge and S gauge had the potential for more detail, Penn Line's founders chose to use the smaller HO gauge. Their thinking was that the potential for realism coming from more elaborate layouts made HO the best compromise. This was at a time when HO gauge was far from the standard it is today. Penn Line produced about a half dozen different locomotives based on prototypes from the Pennsylvania Railroad, hence the choice of the company name Penn Line.

In the early 1960s, Penn Line entered the emerging slot car market. They attempted to bring the same realism that they had used in model railroading to slot car racing. They produced a nicely detailed, but poorly powered Indianapolis-style set endorsed by A. J. Foyt. Problems with this product caused Penn Line to declare bankruptcy in the fall of 1963.

Most of the former Penn Line Pennsylvania Railroad die-cast steam locomotive kits were later produced by Bowser Manufacturing, and are still available in 2007.
