= Paul K. Guillow, Inc. =

American Toy Company

- Industry: Hobbies
- Founded: 1926
- Headquarters: Wakefield, MA; US
- Products: Balsa wood model airplane toys
- Website: Official website

Paul K. Guillow, Inc., commonly known as Guillow's, is an American manufacturer of balsa wood model aircraft kits.

The company was founded by Paul K. Guillow in 1926 in Wakefield, Massachusetts, and was originally called NuCraft Toys.

== Founder ==
Born in 1893, Paul Guillow was a naval aviator during World War I, and returned from Europe with an interest in aviation related toys. He later went on to graduate from Worcester Polytechnic Institute. Guillow died in 1951.

== Company history ==
Among the company's earliest products were a card game called The Lindy Flying Game, which was introduced in 1927, and a board game called Crash: The New Airplane Game which was introduced in 1928.

Soon after Charles Lindbergh's famous solo transatlantic flight in 1927, a craze for all things aeronautical swept over America. Guillow's capitalized on that fad by introducing a line of balsa wood model kits. The first line of Guillow's balsa non-flying shelf model kits consisted of twelve different World War I biplane fighters with six-inch wingspans that retailed for 10-cents each. Each kit contained a 3-view plan, balsa wood cement, two bottles of colored aircraft dope, a strip of bamboo for wing and landing gear struts – this was considered relatively good value for such toys at that time. In 1933, demand for the kits were high enough as to enable Guillow's to move out of the family barn where it had started, and into its present-day location in Wakefield. In the 1940s, the company also supplemented the production of model airplanes with the publication of several books on the construction of flying model planes .

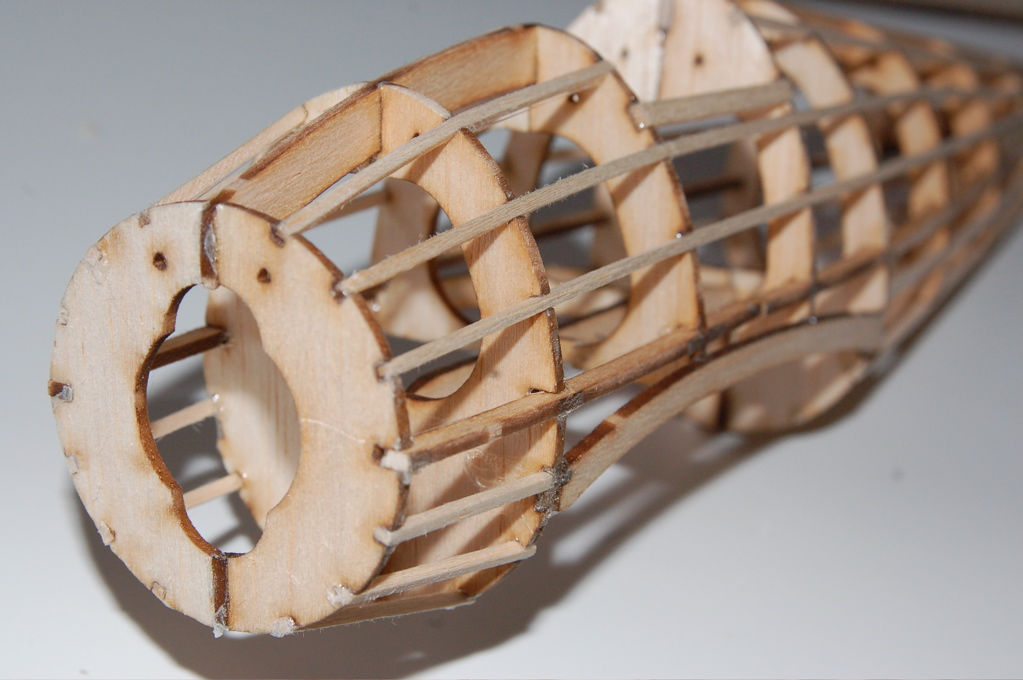
A stick & tissue balsa model airplane under construction, still manufactured by Guillow's

During World War II, the supply of balsa wood was diverted to the war effort for the manufacture of rafts and life jackets. Guillow's was forced to use alternative materials like cardboard or pine wood to manufacture the model kits. In the meantime the company also diversified into building target drone aircraft as training aids for gunners. After the war, to meet changing customer tastes, it shifted its emphasis from stick & tissue kits to concentrate on the mass production of inexpensive hand-launched gliders and rubber band-powered toy planes that were sold at a variety of retail outlets.

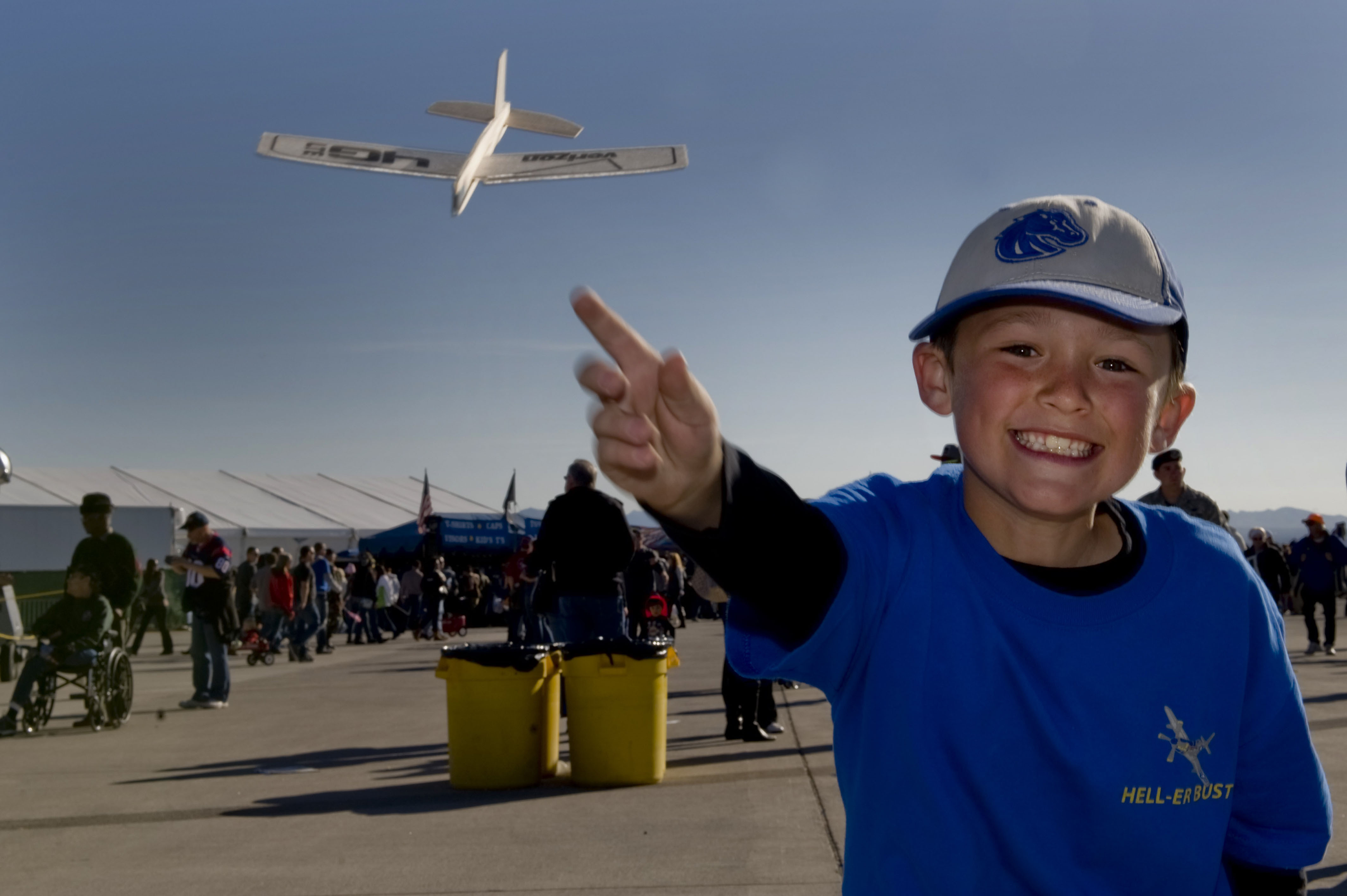
Boy plays with a balsa glider

In 1948, Paul Guillow applied for a United States patent for a model airplane glider "which can be made in various sizes and can be used for instruction in the principles of airplane flight and design, as well as for the amusement and entertainment of possessors. A further object is to enable such practicable glider planes to be constructed of a minimum number of parts, which can be packed in disassembled condition for shipment and purveyance to purchasers, and can be assembled in condition for flying with the utmost ease and almost complete elimination of any liability to wrong assemblage." The patent was granted in 1952, after his death, to his wife Gertrude.

Guillow died in 1951. His wife Gertrude expanded and modernized the company, until she retired in 1980. In 1953, the company introduced a line of mass produced, simple, inexpensive balsa gliders, packaged by high speed machinery. They sold well.

In the 1990s, Guillow's acquired competitors including Tiger, Inc. of Los Angeles and Comet of Chicago. Tiger specialized in "promotional flying toys imprinted with company names and graphics" and Comet was a "direct competitor in balsa kits and gliders". Tiger Inc. was a manufacturer of glider toys made out of foam, and Guillow's still manufactures this type of product. In recent years, the company has converted to laser cutting of balsa parts, resulting in increased accuracy, making assembly easier. In 2011, sales were estimated at US$5-million to $6-million per year.

== Use in research ==
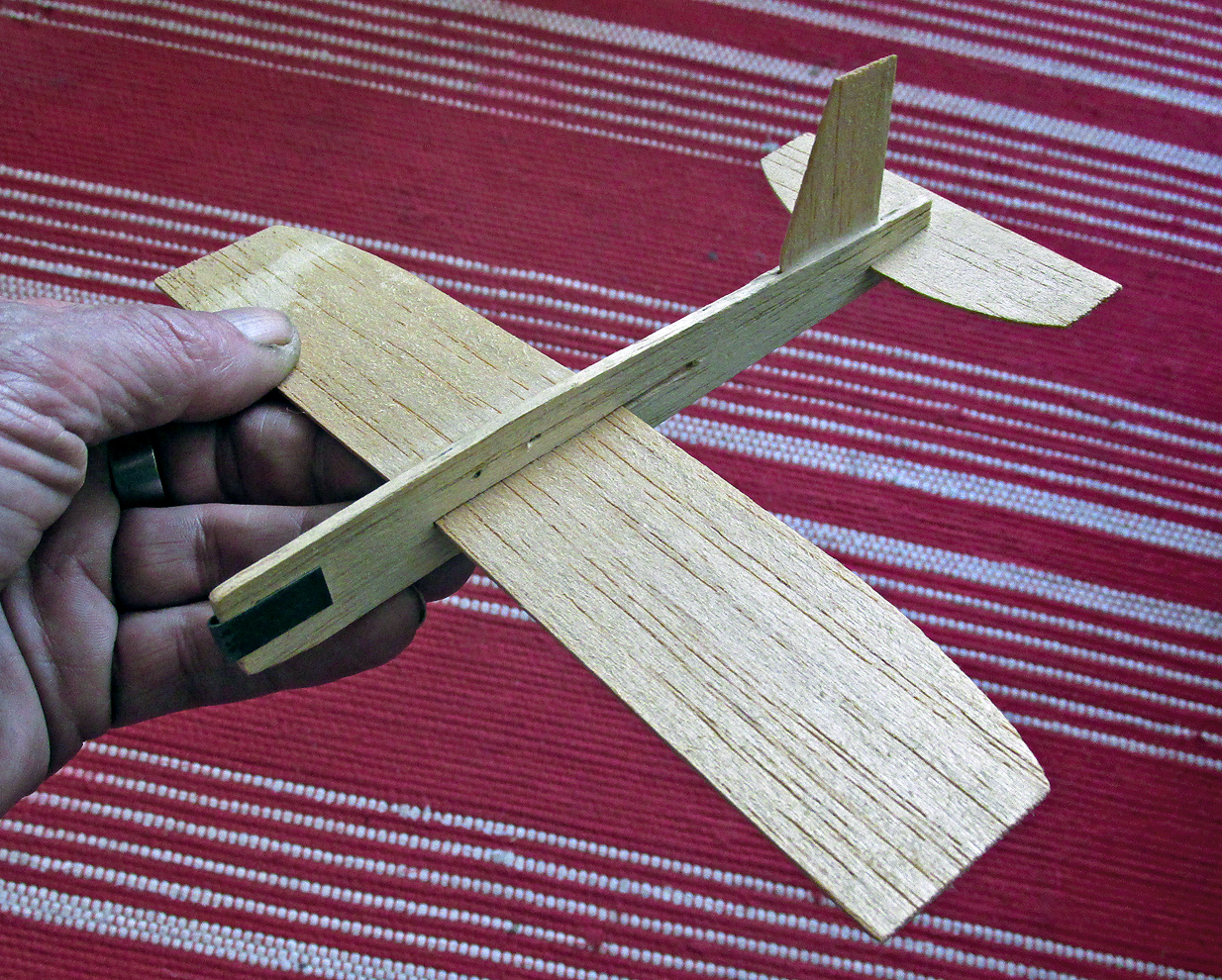
A simple balsa glider

Toy balsa gliders are often used in physics classes to teach aerodynamics including Bernoulli's theorem. In 1999, an article about their characteristics was published in the American Journal of Physics. The article presented a "quantitative analysis" of the performance of the Guillow Super-Ace, which weighed 3.51 grams and sold for $1.99 at that time.

== Product line ==
The company's product line includes dozens of inexpensive slide-together balsa gliders and rubber band-powered airplanes, and dozens of more complex stick-and-tissue scale model airplanes. Approximately 40 percent of the company's business comes from the simpler glider and airplane toys sold through hobby shops and other retail stores, 30 percent from the more complicated scale model kits, and 30 percent from promotional flying toys printed with advertising messages for various businesses, and sold in bulk through promotional product distributors. Product offerings include highly detailed and complex models, including the 1903 Wright Flyer with a 20-inch wingspan, and the B-24 D Liberator with a wingspan of 48-½-inches, the company's largest model.
