= Life-Like =

Manufacturer of model railroad products

Life-Like Trains
- Type: Private
- Industry: Toys and hobbies
- Founded: 1970
- Defunct: 2005
- Fate: Sold to Wm. K. Walthers
- Headquarters: Baltimore, Maryland, U.S.,
- Products: Model trains and accessories

Life-Like was a manufacturer of model trains and accessories. In 1960, the company purchased the assets of the defunct Varney Scale Models and began manufacturing model trains and accessories. In 1970, it discontinued using the Varney brand name, instead selling model trains items under the brand name Life-Like.

In 2005 the parent company, Lifoam Industries, LLC, chose to concentrate on their core products (insulated foam) and sold their model railroad operations to large model railroad distributor Wm. K. Walthers. Today, the Life-Like trademark is used by Walthers for HO Scale Buildings.

== History ==
Kramer Brothers advertisement from February 1948 edition of Model Railroader

Life-Like Products was founded by brothers Lou and Sol Kramer, whose parents were Lithuanian immigrants residing in Baltimore, Maryland. Their experience in the hobby industry began in the 1930s when they became interested in constructing model airplanes. With money borrowed from their mother, the brothers formed the Burd Model Airplane Manufacturing Co. and sold their own model airplane kits using balsa wood they would salvage from discarded banana crates. As the business grew, their line had expanded to include more than 200 different kits. America's entry into World War II put a halt to their production as they could no longer get materials like balsa wood and rubber bands to produce their kits.

Following World War II, the focus of the business shifted from manufacturing to distribution and Kramer Brothers Hobbies was created to sell items like model cars and fishing tackle. They also began making items like model trees and grass mats under the name Life-Like for the first time. They also introduced dyed lichen moss for use as a scenery material, imported from Norway.

Realizing that hobbies had year-round appeal, versus toys that had seasonal sales spikes around the Christmas holiday, the Kramer brothers formed a silent partnership with Lou Glaser and his Revell injection-molded plastic model company in Venice, Los Angeles. The company's breakthrough came in 1953 when Revell offered a scale model kit of the USS Missouri, the battleship where the Japanese surrender that ended World War II was signed. Revell briefly manufactured its own line of HO scale model trains beginning in 1956.

The Kramer brothers sold tunnels for toy train layouts as part of their Life-Like line. The original supplier was making the tunnels from papier mache, but was unable to deliver on a consistent basis. At the same time, they learned about a German manufacturing process to mold expanded polystyrene foam into shapes that could later be painted and decorated. They imported the technology and began making tunnels out of the polystyrene foam. According to son Jay Kramer, in the early 1950s, workers at the factory discovered the insulating properties of the foam tunnels could be used to keep their lunches hot or cold. The company began producing foam ice chest coolers under the Lifoam name in 1954.

== Life-Like Trains ==
Life-Like logo introduced in 1970

Model railroading pioneer Gordon Varney sold off his Varney Scale Models company in 1960 to Sol Kramer. These HO scale model trains continued to be produced under the Varney name until March 1970, when the first advertising for Life-Like trains appeared in Railroad Model Craftsman magazine. The Life-Like line quickly expanded to include trains, track, structure kits, and accessories.

In 1973, Sol Kramer approached industrial engineer Wai Shing Ting to help produce a source of electric motors for his model trains. They launched Sanda Kan as a joint manufacturing venture in Hong Kong. Sanda Kan later expanded into all aspects of manufacturing model trains and accessories for Life-Like, as well as other companies including Atlas Model Railroad, Lionel, and Märklin. Sanda Kan was acquired by Kader in 2008.

Known for its line of toy train sets, Life-Like was known primarily as a "down-market" affordable supplier. Looking to expand more into the world of scale model railroading, the company put together a plan to manufacture models with more accurate and fine details, as well as an improved motor drive, with a reasonable increase in cost. In 1989, Life-Like introduced the Proto 2000 line of finely detailed HO scale diesel locomotives. The first offering was the Proto 2000 model of the BL2 locomotive. The Proto 1000 line was later created to produce a line of trains that would compete against other mid-range products like those made by Athearn and Walthers.

At the same time, Life-Like upped its presence in N scale, moving away from down-market locomotives made for the firm by Mehano in Yugoslavia in the 1970s and beginning production at Sanda Kan with a higher quality line that also began with a BL2, followed by a model of an EMD GP38-2. The quality subsequently increased further, with diecast chassis designs replacing plastic ones on such models as the EMD GP18, GP20, SW9, SW 1200s and accurately scaled Fairbanks-Morse C-Liners. Steam locomotive models included the 2-8-4 Berkshires used on the Van Sweringen railroads.

Life-Like also worked its way into the HO slot car market in the 1980s and 1990s in mass-market outlets, including Toys R Us. They purchased the assets of the Rokar Slot Racing range and marketed this under their own name. It wasn't until after Walther's purchase of Life-Like that the slot car and model railroad ranges were brought together in the High Iron and Burnin' Rubber Combination set.

The Kramer family sold the business to private interests in 2000. Lou Kramer died in 2003, followed by his brother Sol in 2013. In 2005, the parent company Lifoam Industries, LLC, chose to concentrate on its core manufacturing business and sold the model railroad division to Walthers.

Walthers continued to make the Life-Like line of products, aimed at beginning hobbyists and the mass consumer market, up until the 2010s. The Life-Like train sets were discontinued in 2016, along with many of the stand-alone products, although currently building kits and grass mats are still sold under the Life-Like name. Most (if not all) of the Proto 2000 and 1000 locomotives and rolling stock are currently sold under the WalthersProto line, some of the Life-Like scenic accessories (most notably their HO-scale figures) are now made and sold under the Walthers SceneMaster line, and the Power-Loc HO-scale roadbed track (being advertised as the world's first joiner-less roadbed track) is currently being made and sold under the Walthers Trainline brand and is included in the Trainline starter train sets.

== Other countries ==
Models of Australian rolling stock also were produced.

In the 1980s, Life-Like produced a range of models for the South African market competing with Lima.
