= Frog (models) =

Brand of model aircraft

Frog was a well-known British brand of flying model aircraft and scale model construction kits from the 1930s to the 1970s. The company's first model, an Interceptor Mk. 4, was launched in 1932, followed in 1936 by a range of 1:72 scale model aircraft kits made from cellulose acetate, which were the world's first.

Polystyrene models were introduced in 1955, which offered kits of aircraft, ships and cars in various scales. By the 1970s, Frog's catalogue included a large number of lesser-known aircraft types, manufactured only by the company, as well as a number of ship kits.

The last Frog-branded kits were produced in 1976, whereupon many of the Frog moulds were sold to the Soviet Union and marketed under the Novo name.

== History ==
Founded in 1931 by Charles Wilmot and Joe Mansour, International Model Aircraft Ltd. (IMA) originally used the Frog brand name (the F.R.O.G. name was registered as an acronym in 1932 and contrary to later urban myth, did not, at least initially, stand for "Flies Right Off the Ground", which was believed because the first Frog Penguin models were gliders made out of metal that, opposed to being thrown or launched, actually took off from the ground.) on the Interceptor Mk.4 semi-scale rubber-band powered flying model, launched the following year. Also in 1932, a marketing partnership with the toy company Lines Bros Ltd. was formed and other Frog brand flying models followed. In 1936, a range of 1:72 scale aircraft models in kit or pre-built form, moulded in cellulose acetate, was launched under the Frog Penguin name (alluding to the non-flying nature of these models). These were the world's first plastic model construction kits. An early release was the No.21P Empire Flying Boat, issued in 1938.

During the Second World War, the company produced flying models for target purposes and 1:72 scale aircraft recognition models. The Penguin range was dropped in 1949 but a new range of Frog polystyrene kits was introduced in 1955. A wide variety of aircraft, ship and car subjects in various scales were issued during the 1950s and 60s, 1:72 scale being standardised from 1963 onwards for aircraft models.

Production of scale and non-scale flying models continued into the early 1960s.

Frog's 1:72 line-up by the 1970s including a large number of lesser-known aircraft types that were not available from any other model manufacturer at the time, such as the Avro Shackleton, Martin Baltimore and Maryland, Vultee Vengeance, Curtiss Tomahawk, Blackburn Shark and Skua, Bristol 138 and Beaufort, Tupolev SB2, Lavochkin La 7, Supermarine Attacker and Scimitar, Armstrong Whitworth Whitley, Gloster Javelin, SAAB Viggen, Grumman OV-1 Mohawk, de Havilland Vampire, Hornet, and DH 110, Dewoitine D.520, Morane Saulnier MS 406, Macchi MC202 Folgore, Fokker D21, Airspeed Oxford, Miles Magister, Miles Master III, Percival Proctor, Hawker Sea Fury and Tempest, Supermarine Spitfire Mk XIV, Fairey Gannet, Barracuda, Firefly I, and Fairey Delta II, Westland Wyvern, General Aircraft Hotspur, Focke-Wulf Ta 152H, Messerschmitt Me 410, Arado Ar 234, Heinkel He 162, Dornier Do 17z, Dornier Do 335, Heinkel He 219, Gloster E.28/39, North American Mustang II, Vickers Vimy, Ryan NYP "Spirit of St Louis", de Havilland Gypsy Moth "Jason", Fokker Southern Cross, and the Westland Wallace.

Frog also produced a line of larger-sized aircraft as 1:96 scale models, subjects including the Bristol Britannia, Douglas DC-7, Vickers Valiant, Avro Vulcan, Handley Page Victor, de Havilland Comet, and the Vickers Viscount. A lone airship model was of the R100.

In addition to aircraft models, Frog also produced a number of ship kits, four examples being the MV Shell Welder coastal oil tanker, the THLV South Goodwin Lightship, HMS Tiger, and an RNLI lifeboat.

From 1968, Frog issued around 30 ex-Hasegawa kits, mostly 1:72 scale modern jet fighters, some 1:32 scale WWII-era fighters and 1:450 scale battleships.

In France, due to cultural disquiet over the word "frog", these kits were sold and marketed under the "Tri-ang" brand, whilst in North America, for similar reasons, the Frog name was thought unacceptable and the kits were repackaged as "Air Lines" – an allusion to Lines Brothers Ltd – the founders of IMA / Tri-ang.

=== Demise ===
In 1971, IMA's parent company, now Rovex Tri-ang, entered receivership and was acquired by Dunbee-Combex-Marx the following year. During the mid-1970s, some of the Frog kit moulds were transferred to various factories in the Soviet Union and the kits began to reappear under the Novo brand name. Moulds of Second World War Axis powers subjects were acquired by Revell around 1977, the Axis types having been declined by Novo. The last Frog-branded kits were produced in 1976. In more recent years, some ex-Frog/Novo kits have been reissued by Revell and various East European manufacturers.

== Product Lines ==
Model subjects produced by Frog over the years include:

Aircraft
1:72, 1:96, and other scales, covering aircraft from World War I to Cold War era.
Famous Warships
Various scales, mostly World War II era.

== In popular culture ==
On 9 December 2008 on the BBC2 programme "Flog It", a child's walking aid toy, namely a teddy bear on Tri-ang wheels, was shown being auctioned at Calder Valley auction house for the sum of £85.00. On the left flank of the bear is sewn a label stating that it was manufactured by International Model Aircraft Ltd.
