= Steven J. Zaloga =

American author and defense consultant (born 1952)

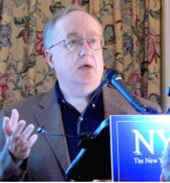
- Steven J. Zaloga presenting at the 2014 New York Military Affairs Symposium
- Born: February 1, 1952 (age 74); Pittsfield, Massachusetts
- Education: Union College, Schenectady, NY, B.A. cum laude (History); Columbia University, M.A. (History); Certificate in International Affairs; graduate study at University of Cracow
- Employers: DMS, Inc., Greenwich, CT, managing editor of special studies, 1978–86; Video Ordnance, Inc., New York City, producer, 1987–92; Teal Group Cor., Fairfax, VA, senior analyst, 1993–; Institute for Defense Analyses, adjunct staff member, 1995–; Technology Training Corp., lecturer, 1987–91
- Board member of: New York Military Affairs Symposium (member of executive board)
- Parent(s): John A. (a foreman) and Muriel (a high school language teacher; maiden name, Desautels) Zaloga

Steven Joseph Zaloga (born February 1, 1952) is an American author and defense consultant. He received a bachelor's degree cum laude at Union College and a master's degree at Columbia University, both in history.

== Career ==
Zaloga is a senior analyst at the Teal Group.

He has published many books dealing with modern military technology, and especially Soviet and CIS tanks and armoured warfare. He is also a noted scale armor modeler and is a host/moderator of the World War II Allied Discussion group at Missing-Lynx.com, a modelling website. He is a frequent contributor to the UK-based modeling magazine Military Modelling. He is a member of the Armor Modeling and Preservation Society.

== Works ==
- — (1978). Sherman Medium Tank, 1942–1945. New Vanguard. Vol. 3. Colour plates by Peter Sarson. Oxford, UK: Osprey Publishing. ISBN 978-1-855322967. OCLC 898911295.
- — (1979). Modern Soviet Armor: Combat Vehicles of the USSR and Warsaw Pact Today (1st American ed.). Englewood Cliffs, NJ: Prentice Hall. ISBN 0-13-597856-4.
- — & Grandsen, James (1981). T-34 in Action. Armor. Vol. 20. Carrollton, TX: Squadron/Signal Publications. ISBN 0-89747-112-1.
- — & Grandsen, James (1981). Soviet Heavy Tanks. Vanguard. Vol. 24. Oxford, UK: Osprey Publishing. ISBN 0-85045-422-0.
- — & Loop, James W. (1982). Modern American Armor: Combat Vehicles of the United States Army Today (1st ed.). Arms & Armour Press. ISBN 978-0-853682486. LCCN 81208199. OCLC 249730412. OL 3880977M.
- — (1982). The Polish Army 1939-1945. Men at Arms. Vol. 117. Illustrated by Richard Hook (1st ed.). Oxford, UK: Osprey Publishing. ISBN 978-0-850454178. OCLC 9136152. OL 8264803M.
- — (1984). The Red Army of the Great Patriotic War, 1941-45. Men-at-Arms. Vol. 216. Colour plates by Ron Volstad. Oxford, UK: Osprey Publishing. ISBN 0850459397. OCLC 57246098.
- — & Grandsen, James (1984). Soviet Tanks and Combat Vehicles of World War Two. London, UK: Arms & Armour Press. ISBN 0-85368-606-8.
- — & Grandsen, James (1985). Operation Barbarossa. Tanks Illustrated. Vol. 16. London, UK: Arms & Armour Press. ISBN 0-853-68702-1. OCLC 12807954.
- — & Loop, James W. (1985). Soviet Bloc Elite Forces. Vol. 5. Illustrated by Ron Volstad. Oxford, UK: Osprey Publishing. ISBN 0-850-45631-2. OCLC 12501799.
- — & Madej, Victor (1985). The Polish Campaign 1939. New York City: Hippocrene Books. ISBN 0882549944.
- — (1989). Red Thrust: Attack on the Central Front, Soviet Tactics and Capabilities in the 1990s. Novato, CA: Presidio Press. ISBN 0-89141-345-6. OCLC 20169366.
- — (1993). M1 Abrams Main Battle Tank 1982-92. New Vanguard. Vol. 2. Oxford, UK: Osprey Publishing. ISBN 978-1-85532-283-7.
- — (1993). T-72 Main Battle Tank 1974-93. New Vanguard. Vol. 6. Oxford, UK: Osprey Publishing. ISBN 1-85532-338-9.
- — (1994). T-34 Medium Tank 1941–45. New Vanguard. Vol. 9. Illustrated by Peter Sarson. Oxford, UK: Osprey Publishing. ISBN 1-85532-382-6.
- — (1995). Inside the Blue Berets: A Combat History of Soviet and Russian Airborne Forces, 1930-1995. Novato, CA: Presidio Press. ISBN 978-0-891413998. LCCN 94040927. OCLC 31517759. OL 1114934M – via Internet Archive.
- — (1996). Bagration 1944: The Destruction of Army Group Centre. Campaign. Vol. 42. Oxford, UK: Osprey Publishing. ISBN 978-1-85532-478-7. LCCN 2003063213. OCLC 474518236. OL 8992906M.
- — & Kinnear, Jim (1996). KV-1 & 2 Heavy Tanks 1939–1945. New Vanguard. Vol. 17. Colour plates by Peter Sarson. Oxford, UK: Osprey Publishing. ISBN 1-85532-496-2.
- —; Kinnear, Jim; Aksenov, Andrey & Koshchavtsev, Aleksandr (1997). Soviet Tanks in Combat 1941–45: The T-28, T-34, T-34-85, and T-44 Medium Tanks. Hong Kong: Concord Publications. ISBN 962-361-615-5.
- — (2000). M26/M46 Pershing Tank 1943–53. New Vanguard. Vol. 35. Illustrated by Tony Bryan & Jim Laurier (1st ed.). Oxford, UK: Osprey Publishing. ISBN 978-1-841762029. OCLC 48783982. OL 8922180M.
- — (2002). Poland 1939: The Birth of Blitzkrieg. Campaign. Vol. 107. Oxford, UK: Osprey Publishing. ISBN 978-1-841764085. OCLC 830377626.
- — (2002). The Kremlin's Nuclear Sword: The Rise and Fall of Russia's Strategic Nuclear Forces, 1945–2000. Washington, DC: Smithsonian Institution Press. ISBN 1-58834-007-4.
- — (2003). Battle of the Bulge 1: St Vith and the Northern Shoulder. Campaign. Vol. 115. Oxford, UK: Osprey Publishing.
- — (2003). Modelling the M3/M5 Stuart Light Tank. Modelling Masterclass. Vol. 4. Oxford, UK: Osprey Publishing. ISBN 1-84176-763-8.
- — (2004). Battle of the Bulge 2: Bastogne. Campaign. Vol. 145. Oxford, UK: Osprey Publishing.
- — (2004). T-54 and T-55 Main Battle Tanks 1944-2004. New Vanguard. Vol. 102. Oxford, UK: Osprey Publishing. ISBN 1-84176-792-1.
- — (2005). Anzio 1944: The Beleaguered Beachhead. Campaign. Vol. 155. Illustrated by Peter Dennis. Oxford, UK: Osprey Publishing. ISBN 978-1-84176-913-4. OCLC 936633399. OL 8922813M.
- — (2005). D-Day Fortifications in Normandy. Fortress. Vol. 37. Illustrated by Hugh Johnson. Oxford, UK: Osprey Publishing. ISBN 1-841-76876-6. OCLC 61529026.
- — (2005). Jeeps 1941–45. New Vanguard. Vol. 117. Illustrated by Hugh Johnson. Oxford, UK: Osprey Publishing. ISBN 978-1-84176-888-5.
- — (2005). Kasserine Pass 1943: Rommel's Last Victory. Campaign. Vol. 152. Illustrated by Michael Welply. Oxford, UK: Osprey Publishing. ISBN 1-841-76914-2. OCLC 60793211.
- — (2005). V-1 Flying Bomb 1942–52: Hitler's infamous "doodlebug". New Vanguard. Vol. 106. Illustrated by Jim Laurier (4th ed.). Oxford, UK: Osprey Publishing. ISBN 978-1-841767918. OCLC 60834667. OL 8922703M.
- — (2006). Remagen 1945: Endgame against the Third Reich. Campaign. Vol. 175. Oxford, UK: Osprey Publishing. ISBN 978-1-846030185.
- — (2006). Scud Ballistic Missile and Launch Systems 1955–2005. New Vanguard. Vol. 120. Oxford, UK: Osprey Publishing. ISBN 978-1-841769479.
- — (2007). Japanese Tanks 1939–45. New Vanguard. Vol. 137. Oxford, UK: Osprey Publishing. ISBN 978-1-84603-091-8.
- — (2007). Red Sam: The SA-2 Guideline Anti-Aircraft Missile. New Vanguard. Vol. 134. Oxford, UK: Osprey Publishing. ISBN 978-1-84603-062-8.
- — (2007). The Siegfried Line, 1944–45: Battles on the German Frontier. Campaign. Vol. 181. Illustrated by Steve Noon. Oxford, UK: Osprey Publishing. ISBN 978-1-846-03121-2. OCLC 76365230.
- — (2008). Armored Thunderbolt: The U.S. Army Sherman in World War II. Mechanicsburg, PA: Stackpole Books. ISBN 978-0-811-70424-3. LCCN 2008003234. OCLC 237193918. OL 16445043M.
- — (2008). German V-Weapon Sites 1943–45. Fortress. Vol. 72. Illustrated by Hugh Johnson & Chris Taylor. Oxford, UK: Osprey Publishing. ISBN 978-1-84603-247-9.
- — (2009). Modelling US Armor of World War 2. Modelling Masterclass. Oxford, UK: Osprey Publishing. ISBN 978-1-84603-398-8.
- — & Ford, Ken (2009). Overlord: The D-Day Landings. Oxford, UK: Osprey Publishing. ISBN 978-1-84603-424-4.
- — (2009). T-80 Standard Tank: The Soviet Army's Last Armored Champion. New Vanguard. Vol. 152. Oxford, UK: Osprey Publishing. ISBN 978-1-84603-244-8.
- — (2009). The Atlantic Wall (2): Belgium, The Netherlands, Denmark and Norway. Fortress. Vol. 89. Oxford, UK: Osprey Publishing. ISBN 978-1-84603-393-3.
- — (2010). Battle of the Bulge. Campaign. Oxford, UK: Osprey Publishing. ISBN 978-1-84908-165-8. LCCN 2011381845. OCLC 900919720. OL 25056439M – via Internet Archive.
- — (2010). French Tanks of World War I. New Vanguard. Vol. 173. Oxford, UK: Osprey Publishing. ISBN 978-1-84603-513-5.
- — (2012). M4 Sherman vs Type 97 Chi-Ha: The Pacific 1945. Duel. Vol. 43. Illustrated by Richard Chasemore. Oxford, UK: Osprey Publishing. ISBN 978-1-849086387.
- — & Kinnear, Jim (2013). T-34-85 Medium Tank 1944–94. New Vanguard. Vol. 20. Oxford, UK: Osprey Publishing. ISBN 978-1-85532-535-7.
- — (2013). Tanks of Hitler's Eastern Allies 1941–45. New Vanguard. Vol. 199. Illustrated by Henry Morshead. Oxford, UK: Osprey Publishing.
- — (2013). The Devil's Garden: Rommel's Desperate Defense of Omaha Beach on D-Day. Mechanicsburg, PA: Stackpole Books. ISBN 978-0-811-71228-6. OCLC 828488810.
- — (2019). Ploesti 1943: The Great Raid on Hitler's Romanian Oil Refineries. Air Campaign. Vol. 12. Illustrated by Steve Noon (1st ed.). Oxford, UK: Osprey Publishing. ISBN 978-1-472831804. OCLC 1111474916. OL 28900822M.
- — (2024). Tanks in the Philippines 1944–45: The biggest armored clashes of the Pacific War. Osprey Publishing. ISBN 978-1472859402.
