= International Plastic Modellers' Society =

Hobbyist organization

The International Plastic Modellers' Society (often shortened to IPMS) is an international organisation of hobbyists interested in building plastic model kits. The Society is made up of national branches, and within these, local clubs who usually represent a town, city or locality. The first branch was established in the United Kingdom in 1963.

Local clubs organise regular meetings, typically once a month for members to meet up, show off their latest models, discuss the hobby and work on ongoing projects. Many also organise their own annual shows and invite fellow clubs to display alongside traders, and together, these shows make up a busy calendar of events throughout each year. The UK has the most developed club network, with organisations covering virtually the whole country. Elsewhere, local clubs can often function as national branches simultaneously, such as IPMS Argentina who also represent the Mar del Plata region of the country.

At a higher level, national branches will also organise their own shows. These are typically termed 'Nationals'. The largest of these is IPMS UK's Scale ModelWorld, held at Telford in November each year and features not just local British club displays, but also contributions from overseas branches and clubs, such is its scale.

In addition to the branch and club structure, Special Interest Groups (SIG) exist which focus on a specific area or type of model building, for instance a particular aircraft such as the Tornado, a time period like the Cold War, a manufacturer such as Airfix or a genre like science fiction and fantasy. SIGs often transcend club and branch boundaries, being made up of modellers from around the world sharing a common interest. As a result, most SIGs do not meet up on a regular basis like clubs, but instead communicate more frequently online.

== UK SIGs ==
List of current UK SIGs on IPMS UK website

== IPMS (USA) SIGs ==
List of current SIGs

== National branches ==
Name	Year founded	Website
IPMS Argentina	1985	IPMS Argentina
IPMS Auckland (New Zealand)		IPMS Auckland (New Zealand)
IPMS Australia	1964	IPMS Australia
IPMS Austria	1970	IPMS Austria
IPMS Belgium	1968	IPMS Belgium
IPMS Brazil (GPPSD)	1978	IPMS Brazil (GPPSD)
IPMS Brunei		
IPMS Bulgaria	2011	
IPMS Canada	1964	IPMS Canada
IPMS Chile	1987	IPMS Chile
IPMS China		IPMS China
IPMS Colombia		
IPMS Costa Rica		
IPMS Croatia	2016	
IPMS Cuba		
IPMS Cyprus	1996	IPMS Cyprus
IPMS Czech Republic		IPMS Czech Republic
IPMS Denmark	1965	IPMS Denmark
IPMS Dominican Republic	2021	IPMS Rep. Dominicana
IPMS Ecuador	2013	IPMS Ecuador
IPMS Egypt		IPMS Egypt
IPMS El Salvador		
IPMS Finland	1968	IPMS Finland
IPMS France	1975	Fédération Française de Maquettisme Statique
IPMS Germany	1966	IPMS Germany
IPMS Greece	1981	IPMS Greece
IPMS Guatemala		IPMS Guatemala
IPMS Honduras		IPMS Honduras
IPMS Hungary	2017	
IPMS Indonesia	2001	
(Republic of Ireland) IPMS Ireland	2007	IPMS Ireland
IPMS Israel	1987	IPMS Israel
IPMS Italy	1968	IPMS Italy
IPMS Lebanon	2017	IPMS Lebanon
(South Korea) IPMS Korea	2011	IPMS Korea
IPMS Latvia	2014	IPMS Latvia
IPMS Luxembourg	1980	IPMS Luxembourg
IPMS Malaysia		
IPMS Malta	1981	IPMS Malta
IPMS Mexico	1977	IPMS Mexico
IPMS Netherlands	1971	IPMS Netherlands
IPMS Norway		IPMS Norway
IPMS Pakistan	2017	IPMS Pakistan
IPMS Panama		IPMS Panama
IPMS Peru		
IPMS Philippines	1968	IPMS Philippines
IPMS Poland	2011	IPMS Poland
IPMS Portugal		IPMS Portugal
IPMS Puerto Rico (Borinqueneers)		IPMS Puerto Rico
IPMS Qatar	2012	IPMS Qatar
IPMS Romania (AMA)	2010	IPMS Romania (AMA)
IPMS Russia		
IPMS Serbia	2011	IPMS Serbia
IPMS Slovenia		IPMS Slovenia
IPMS South Africa		IPMS South Africa
IPMS Spain		IPMS Spain
(Spain) IPMS Canary Islands		IPMS Canary Islands
IPMS Sweden	1967	
IPMS Switzerland	1973	IPMS Switzerland
IPMS Turkey		IPMS Turkey
IPMS Ukraine	2018	IPMS Boryspil (UA)
(United Kingdom) IPMS UK	1963	IPMS UK
(United States) IPMS USA	1964	IPMS USA
IPMS Uruguay	1987	IPMS URUGUAY
IPMS Venezuela	2011	IPMS Venezuela

See also

Similar societies

- Armor Modeling and Preservation Society (AMPS)
- Miniature Armoured Fighting Vehicle Association (MAFVA)

Models and model building

- list of model aircraft manufacturers.
- Kitbashing, creating a model by combining different kits.
- Model military vehicles
- Ship models, some of which are plastic kits.
- Gundam Models, plastic models of Japanese science fiction.

Manufacturers

- Tamiya Corporation
- Academy Plastic Model Co.
- Revell
- Aoshima Bunka Kyozai Co.
- Dragon Models Limited DML.
- Hasegawa
- Kyosho
- Airfix
