= MERDC camouflage =

US military vehicle camouflage standard

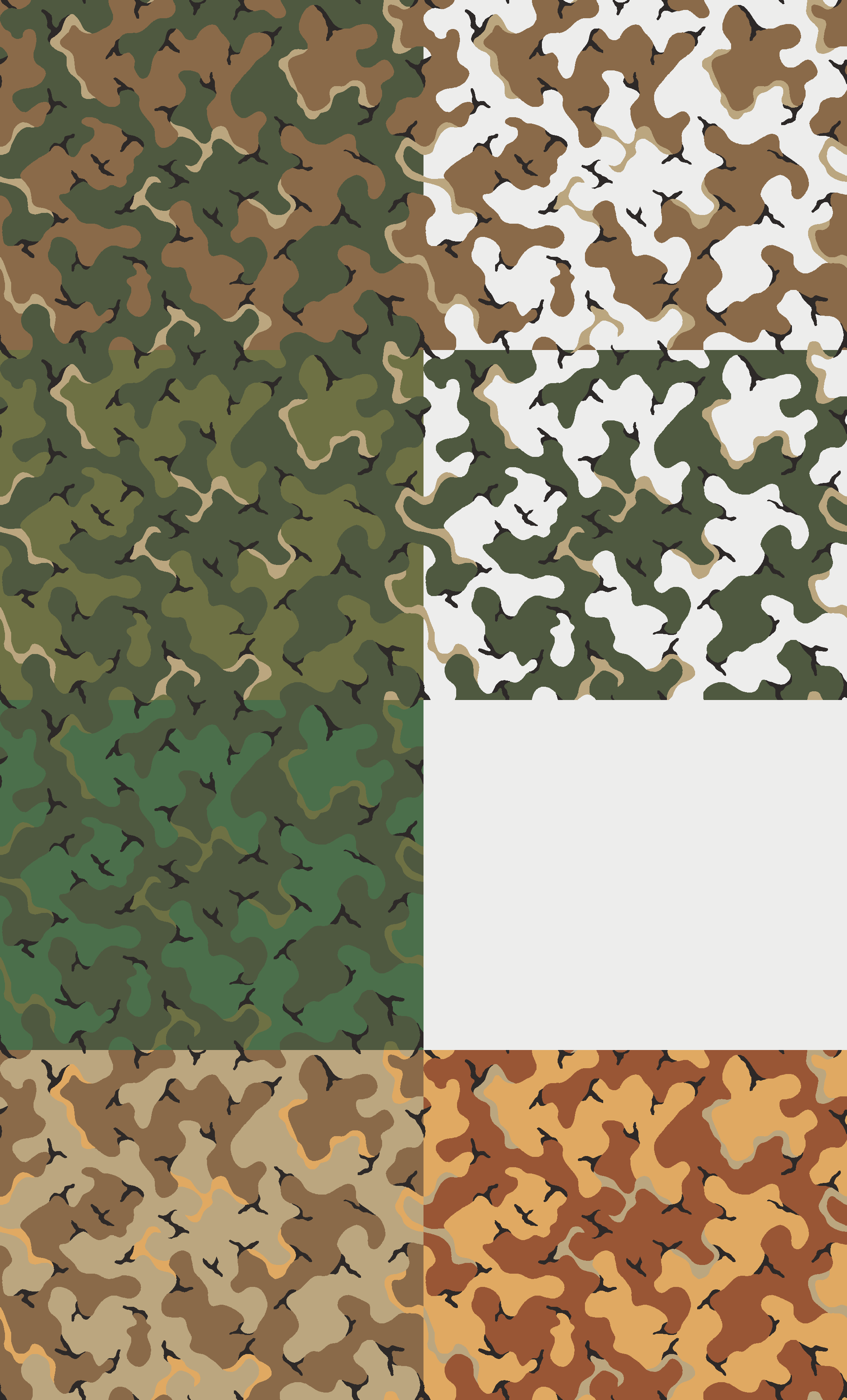
Some examples of MERDC camouflage

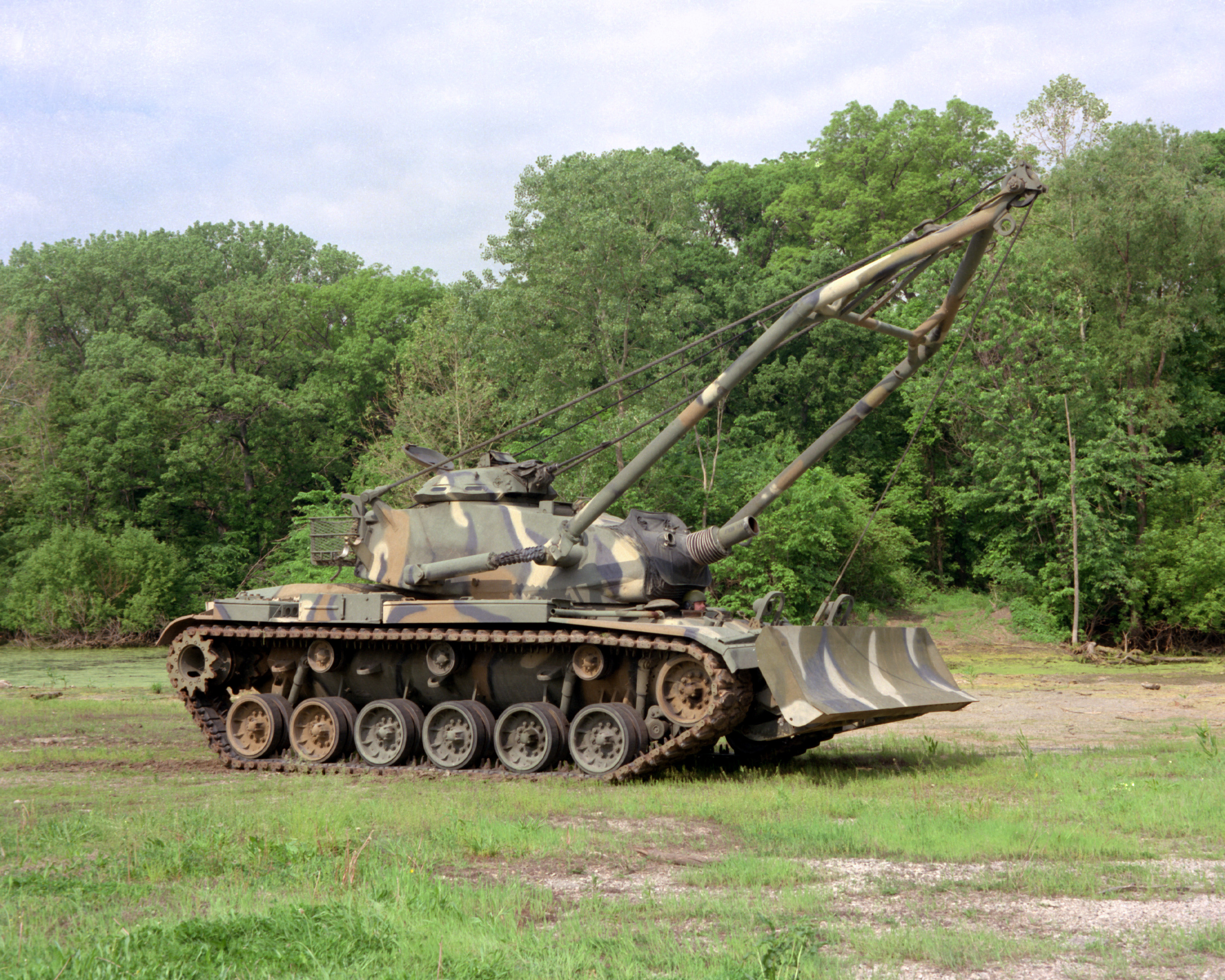
An M728 Combat Engineer Vehicle with MERDC Camouflage

MERDC camouflage is a system of standardized camouflage paint schemes for military vehicles developed by the US Army Mobility Equipment Research & Development Center (MERDC) during the 1970s. Each vehicle-specific paint scheme consisted of a color placement pattern and a combination of four out of twelve colors from the Federal Standard 595 (FS595) color reference. The colors and pattern scheme could be adjusted as the environments changed. Military modelers often emulate the schemes when painting models and soldiers.

== Colors ==
Colors used in MERDC camouflage paint schemes
Color	FS 595 code
White	n/a
Desert sand	30279
Sand	30277
Earth yellow	30257
Earth red	30117
Field drab	30118
Earth brown	30099
Olive drab	34087
Light green	34151
Dark green	34102
Forest green	34079
Black	37038
