= 1:350 scale =

Scale for model ship kits

1:350 scale is a popular scale used by model ship kit manufacturers such as Tamiya, Hasegawa, Aoshima, Fujimi, Trumpeter and Revell.

== History ==
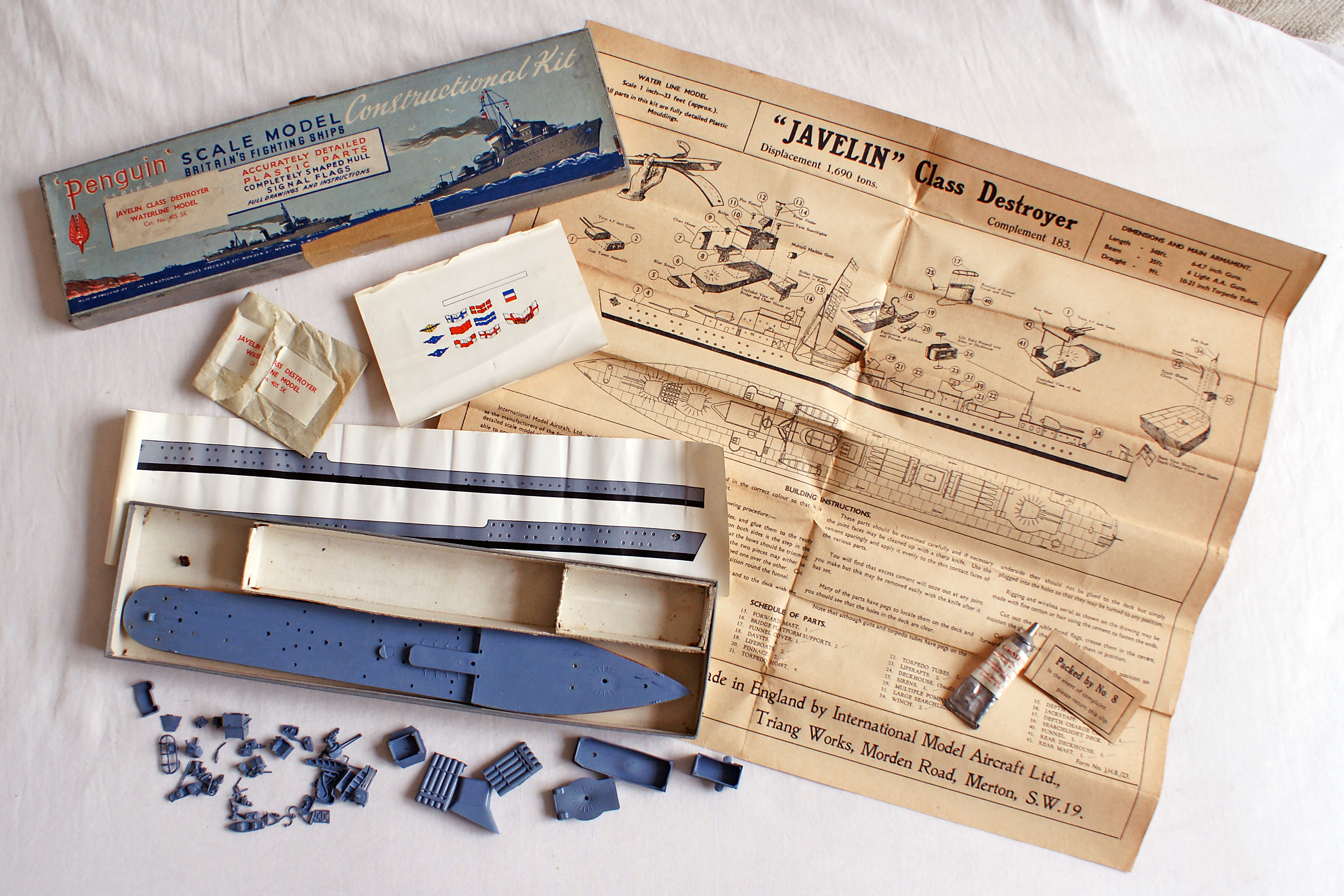
FROG Penguin HMS Javelin destroyer kit (1945)

The true instigator of the 1:350 scale ship series was the British kit company Frog (models), which was started in 1932 by Joe Mansour and brothers Charles and John Wilmot. The first four years FROG focused on flying scale models, but in December 1936 they released the first three all-plastic kits, in a range called Penguin. The range consisted of both civil and military aircraft and ground accessories, all to a standard 1:72 scale, and were all designed by John Wilmot. In 1940 however two 1:350 kits were planned: the Javelin and Tribal Destroyer - initially designed to be fitted with an all plastic hull and electric motor. However - around this period all or most companies changed to wartime production, and so did Lines Bros, the toy factory to which FROG (or IMA) belonged. So both kits were postponed, and eventually issued in December 1945. Some changes were made to the kit due to shortage of plastic: both Destroyers ended up as waterline models with a wooden hull unto which a plastic superstructure was (factory) glued. Two transfers with printed hull sides were added.

It took no less than 21 years before this scale was discovered by other companies as an ideal scale for a model kit to represent a (full size) ship. First to follow suit was by Imai Kagaku with the release of tall ships from Operation Sail (1976) in 1977. Tamiya came next with a production of the German battleship Bismarck in 1978. Tamiya only released a limited number of ship kits in this series which included kits for the Japanese battleship Yamato, HMS King George V (41), USS Missouri (BB-63) and USS Enterprise (CVN-65).

In the 1990s, the Hong Kong company Dragon Models released several modern US naval ships and submarines in 1:350 scale, such as the Spruance-class destroyer which was released in 1990. Chinese company Trumpeter released several ships from the modern Chinese navy in the early 2000s.

The market for 1:350 scale ship model kits expanded further after Hasegawa released a newly tooled kit of the Japanese battleship Mikasa in 2005, which featured modern molding and greater detail. Other Japanese companies including Aoshima, Fujimi, Pit-Road and Fine Molds have followed suit to produce a number of Japanese World War II ships. Tamiya have also revived their 1:350 ship series, beginning with an all new tooling of the Japanese battleship Yamato in November 2011. The kit can be built as a full-hull or waterline model.

Companies from outside Japan such as Revell and Airfix have begun to produce various 1:350 scale ships as well. Trumpeter have released a large series of models in this scale since the late 2000s including a range of German and Allied World War 2 vessels, modern US Navy, Royal Navy and JMSDF vessels.

== Reception ==
The scale is becoming universally popular and is now considered as a 'standard scale' for ship modelling. Its popularity is primarily because the scale is large enough to show a substantial level of detailing, whilst remaining small enough to be displayed sensibly.

== See also ==
- Scale model
- Ship model
- List of scale model sizes
