= Plastic model kit =

Scale model kit

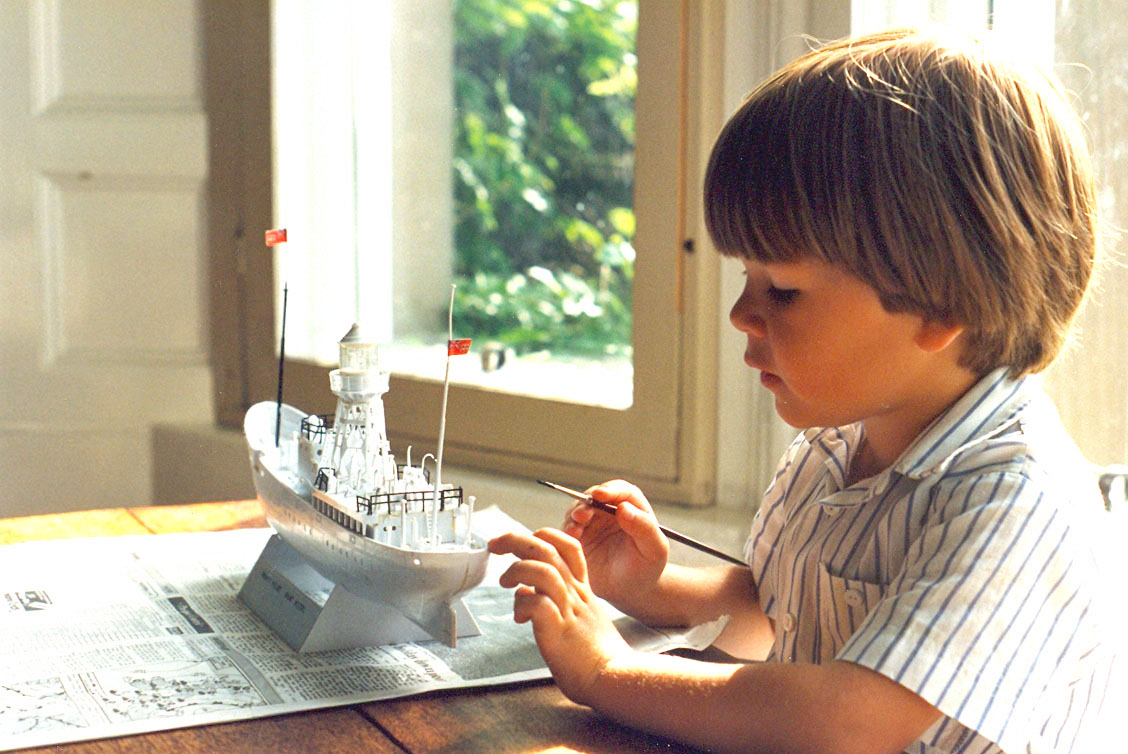
A young boy starts painting an assembled plastic model of the South Goodwin Lightship

A plastic model kit, (plamo in Eastern influenced parlance), is a consumer-grade plastic scale model manufactured as a kit, primarily assembled by hobbyists, and intended primarily for display. A plastic model kit depicts various subjects, ranging from real life military and civilian vehicles to characters and machinery from original kit lines and pop fiction, especially from eastern pop culture. A kit varies in difficulty, ranging from a "snap-together" model that assembles straight from the box, to a kit that requires special tools, paints, and plastic cements.

== Subjects ==
The most popular subjects of plastic models by far are vehicles such as aircraft, ships, automobiles, and armored vehicles such as tanks. The majority of models throughout its early history depict military vehicles, due to the wider variety of form and historical context compared to civilian vehicles. Other subjects include science fiction vehicles and mecha, real spacecraft, buildings, animals, human(oid) dolls/action figures, and characters from pop culture.

While military, ship, and aircraft modelers prize accuracy above all, modelers of automobiles and science-fiction themes may attempt to duplicate an existing subject, or may depict a completely imaginary subject. The creation of custom automobile models is related to the creation of actual custom cars and often an individual may have an interest in both, although the cost of customizing a real car is obviously enormously greater than that of customizing a model.

== Construction and techniques ==
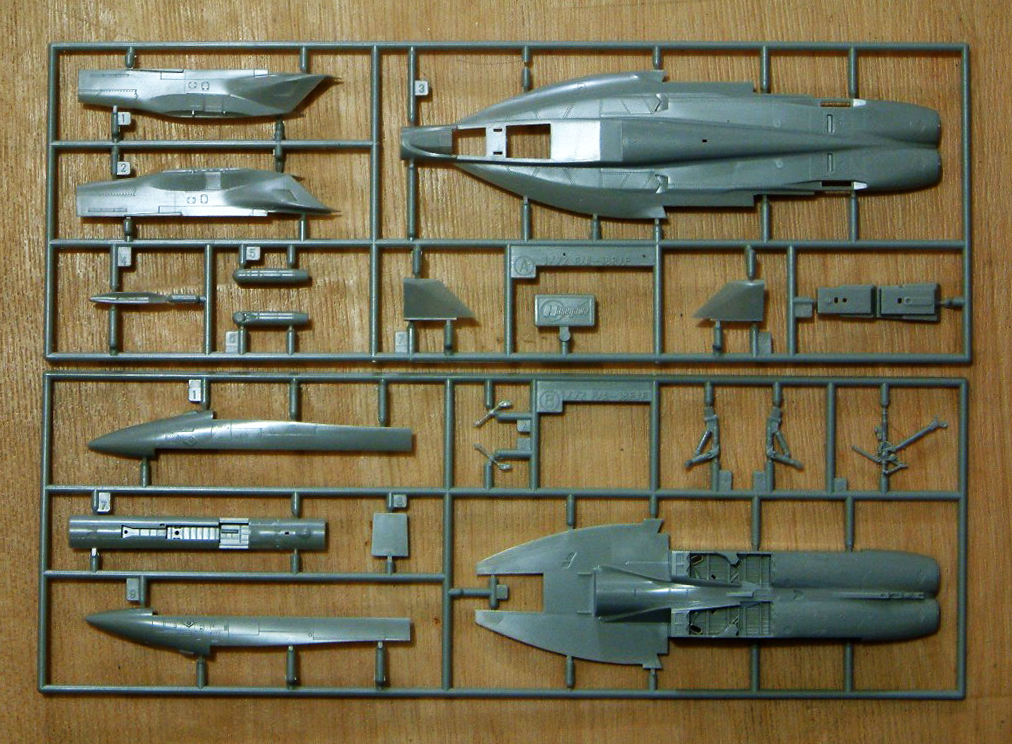
Unassembled parts of a Hasegawa 1/72 F/A-18E kit. The frame surrounding the various parts is called the injection moulding "runner" or "sprue"

The first plastic models were injection molded in cellulose acetate (e.g. Frog Penguin and Varney Trains), but currently most plastic models are injection-molded in polystyrene, and the parts are bonded together, usually with a plastic solvent-based adhesive, although modelers may also use epoxy, cyanoacrylate, and white glue where their particular properties would be advantageous. While often omitted by novice modellers, specially formulated paint is sold for application to plastic models. Complex markings such as aircraft insignia or automobile body decorative details and model identification badges are typically provided with kits as screen-printed water-slide decals.

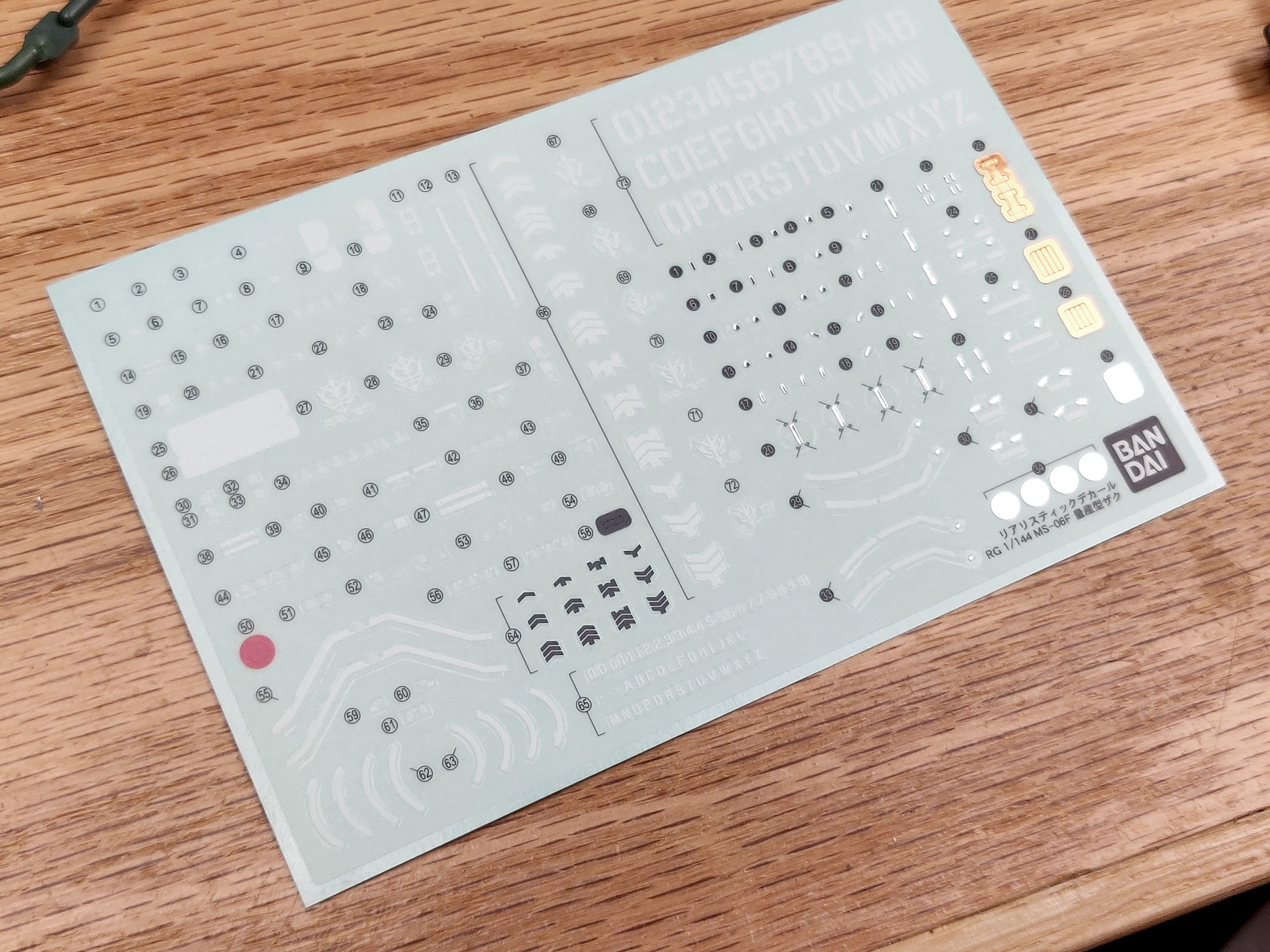
Decal sheet

Recently, models requiring less skill, time, and/or effort have been marketed, targeted to younger or less skilled modelers as well as those who just wish to reduce the time and effort required to complete a model. One such trend has been to offer a fully detailed kit requiring normal assembly and gluing, but eliminate the often frustrating task of painting the kit by molding it out of colored plastic, or by supplying it pre-painted and with decals applied. Often these kits are identical to another kit supplied in normal white or gray plastic except for the colored plastic or the prepainting, thus eliminating the large expense of creating another set of molds.

Another trend which has become very extensive is to produce kits where the parts snap together, with no glue needed; sometimes the majority of the parts snap together with a few requiring glue. Often there is some simplification of detail as well; for instance, automotive kits without opening hoods and no engine detail, or sometimes opaque windows with no interior detail. These are often supplied in colored plastic, although smaller details would still require painting. Decals are usually not supplied with these but sometimes vinyl stickers are provided for insignia and similar details.

Resin casting and vacuum forming are also used to produce models, or particular parts where the scale of production is not such as to support the investment required for injection molding.

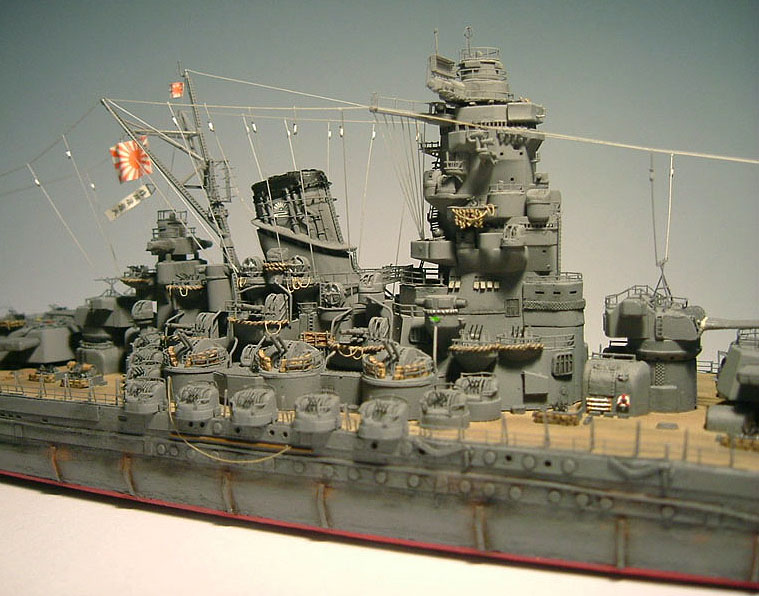
Details of Tamiya 1/700 scale model of the Japanese battleship Yamato, which is heavily detailed with aftermarket photo-etch detailing parts.

Plastic ship model kits typically provide thread in several sizes and colors for the rigging. Automobile kits typically contain vinyl tires, although sometimes these are molded from polystyrene as well, particularly in very inexpensive kits. Thin metal details produced by photoetching have become popular relatively recently, both as detailing parts manufactured and sold by small businesses, and as parts of a complete kit. Detail parts of other materials are sometimes included in kits or sold separately, such as metal tubing to simulate exhaust systems, or vinyl tubing to simulate hoses or wiring.

== Scales ==
Almost all plastic models are designed in a well-established scale. Each type of subject has one or more common scales, though they differ from one to the other. The general aim is to allow the finished model to be of a reasonable size, while maintaining consistency across models for collections. The following are the most common scales for popular subjects:

- Aircraft: 1/24, 1/32, 1/48, 1/72, 1/100, and 1/144. The most popular scales are 1/48 and 1/72.
- Military vehicles: 1/16, 1/24, 1/32, 1/35, 1/48, 1/72, and 1/76.
- Automobiles: 1/8, 1/12, 1/16, 1/18, 1/20, 1/24, 1/25, 1/32, 1/35, and 1/43.
- Ships: 1/72, 1/96, 1/144, 1/200, 1/350, 1/400 1/450, 1/600, and 1/700.
- Figures: 1/72, 1/48, 1/35, 1/24, 1/16, 1/13, 1/8, 1/6, and 1/4. The smaller scale figures are usually used in dioramas; the larger scales (1/8 and 1/6) are popular for stand-alone subjects.
- Figurine busts: 1/12, 1/10, 1/9
- Railways: 1:43.5 (7 mm/1 ft : O scale), 1:76.2 (4 mm/1 ft : OO scale), 1:87 (3.5 mm/1 ft : HO scale)
- Mecha: 1/144, 1/100, 1/72, 1/60, and 1/35.

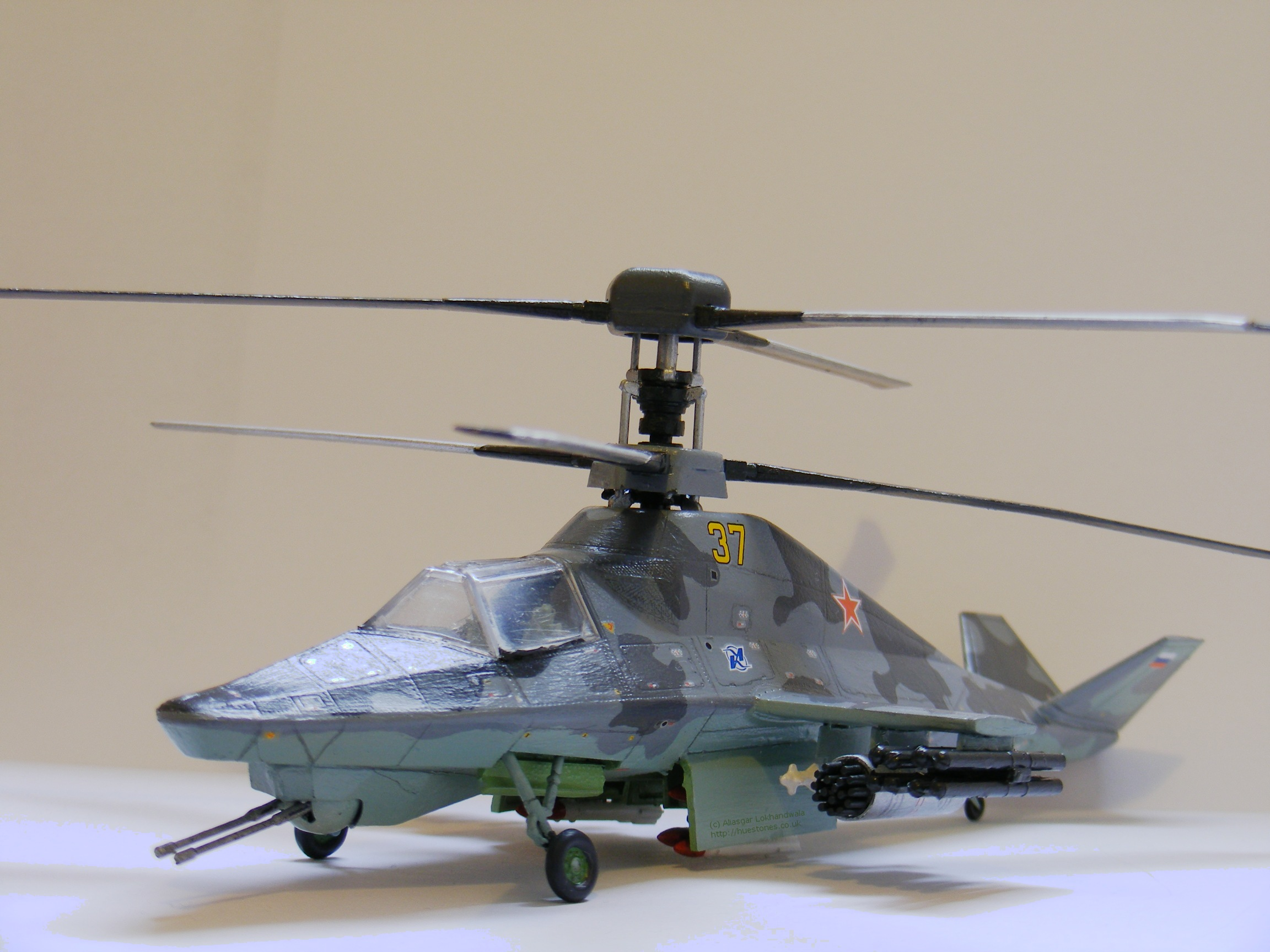
Revell Kamov Ka-58

In reality, models do not always conform to their nominal scale; there are 1/25 scale automobile models which are larger than some 1/24 scale models, for instance. For example, the engine in the recent reissue of the AMT Ala Kart show truck is significantly smaller than the engine in the original issue. AMT employees from the 1960s note that, at that time, all AMT kits were packaged into boxes of a standardized size, to simplify shipping; and the overriding requirement of designing any kit was that it had to fit into that precise size of box, no matter how large or small the original vehicle. This practice was common for other genres and manufacturers of models as well. In modern times this practice has become known as fit-the-box scale. In practice, this means that kits of the same subject in nominally identical scales may produce finished models which actually differ in size, and that hypothetically identical parts in such kits may not be easily swapped between them, even when the kits are both by the same manufacturer.

The shape of the model may not entirely conform to the subject, as well; reviews of kits in modeling magazines often comment on how well the model depicts the original.

== History ==
The first plastic models were manufactured at the end of 1936 by Frog in the UK, with a range of 1/72nd scale model kits called 'Penguin'. In the late 1940s several American companies such as Hawk, Varney, Empire, Renwal and Lindberg began to produce plastic models. Many manufacturers began production in the 1950s and gained ascendancy in the 1960s such as Aurora, Revell, AMT, and Monogram in America, Airfix in UK and Heller SA in France. Other manufacturers included; Matchbox (UK), Italeri, ESCI, (both Italian) Novo {ex-Frog moulds} (former Soviet Union), and Fujimi, Nichimo, Tamiya Corporation and Bandai (Japan).

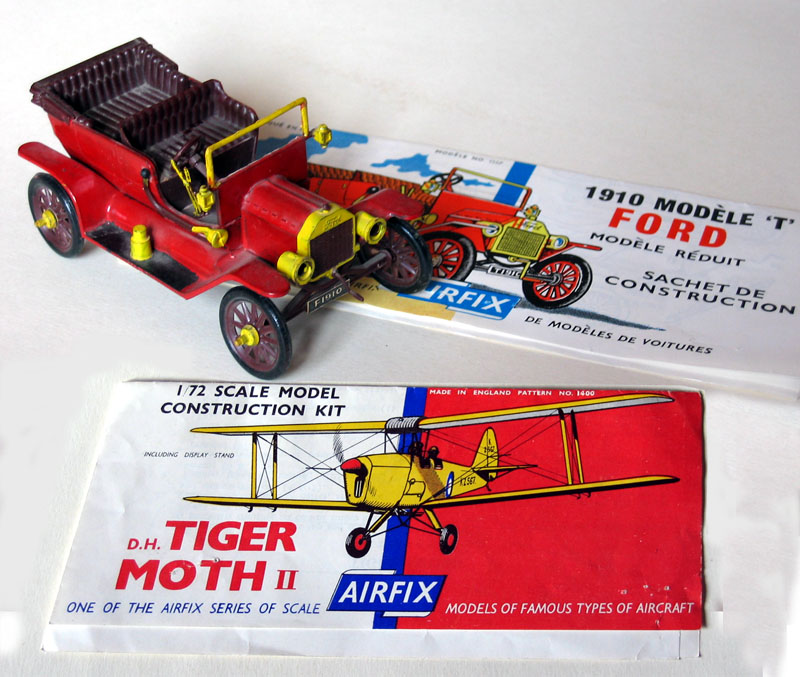
Two vintage Airfix kits

American model companies who had been producing assembled promotional scale models of new automobiles each year for automobile dealers found a lucrative side business selling the unassembled parts of these "promos" to hobbyists to assemble, thus finding a new revenue stream for the injection molds which were so expensive to update each year. These early models were typically lower in detail than currently standard, with non-opening hoods and no engines, and simplified or no detail on the chassis, which attached to the body with very visible screws. Within a short time, the kit business began to overshadow the production of promos, and the level of accuracy and detail was raised to satisfy the demands of the marketplace.

In the 1960s, Tamiya manufactured aircraft kits in the peculiar (at the time) scale of 1/100. Although the range included famous aircraft such as the Boeing B-52 Stratofortress, McDonnell Douglas F-4 Phantom II, North American F-86 Sabre, Dassault Mirage III, Grumman A-6 Intruder and the LTV A-7 Corsair II, it never enjoyed the same success as 1/72 scale kits did. Soon, Tamiya stopped manufacturing 1/100 scale aircraft but re-issued a small selection of them in 2004.

Since the 1970s, Japanese firms such as Hasegawa and Tamiya, and since the 1990s also Chinese firms such as DML, AFV Club and Trumpeter have dominated the field and represent the highest level of technology. Brands from Russia, Central Europe, and Korea have also become prominent recently with companies like Academy Plastic Model. Many smaller companies have also produced plastic models, both in the past and currently.

Prior to the rise of plastic models, shaped wood models were offered to model builders. These wood model kits often required extensive work to create results easily obtained by the plastic models.

With the development of new technologies, modeling hobby can also be practiced in the virtual world. The game Model Builder, produced by Moonlit Studio, available on Steam, consists of cutting, assembling, and painting airplanes, helicopters, tanks, cars, and making dioramas with them. Transferring the hobby to the game world allows novice modelers and people who do not have space, time, or money to buy multiple models to pursue their interests. Another form of practicing in the virtual world is a 3D modeling with the use of such software like Blender, FreeCAD, Lego Digital Designer (superseded by BrickLink Studio) or LeoCAD, etc.

== Manufacture ==
While injection-molding is the predominant manufacturing process for plastic models, the high costs of equipment and making molds make it unsuitable for lower-yield production. Thus, models of minor and obscure subjects are often manufactured using alternative processes. Vacuum forming is popular for aircraft models, though assembly is more difficult than for injection-molded kits. Early manufacturers of vacuum formed model kits included Airmodel (the former DDR), Contrail, Airframe (Canada), Formaplane, and Rareplanes (UK). Resin-casting, popular with smaller manufacturers, particularly aftermarket firms (but also producers of full kits), yields a greater degree of detail moulded in situ, but as the moulds used don't last as long, the price of such kits is considerably higher. In recent times, the latest releases from major manufacturers offer unprecedented detail that is a match for the finest resin kits, often including high-quality mixed-media (photo-etched brass, turned aluminum) parts.

== Variations ==
Many modellers build dioramas as landscaped scenes built around one or more models. They are most common for military vehicles such as tanks, but airfield scenes and 2-3 ships in formation are also popular.

Conversions use a kit as a starting point, and modify it to be something else. For instance, kits of the USS Constitution ("Old Ironsides") are readily available, but the Constitution was just one of six sister ships, and an ambitious modeller will modify the kit, by sawing, filing, adding pieces, and so forth, to make a model of one of the others.

Scratch building is the creation of a model "from scratch" rather than a manufactured kit. True scratchbuilt models consist of parts made by hand and do not incorporate parts from other kits. These are rare. When parts from other kits are included, the art is technically called "Kit Bashing." Most pieces referred to as "scratchbuilt" are actually a combination of kit bashing and scratchbuilding. Thus, it has become common for either term to be used loosely to refer to these more common hybrid models.

Kitbashing is a modelling technique where parts from multiple model kits are combined to create a novel model form. For example, the effects crews on the various Star Trek TV shows frequently kitbashed multiple starship models to quickly create new classes of ship for use in background scenes where details would not be particularly obvious.

== Issues ==
The demographics of plastic modeling have changed in its half-century of existence, from young boys buying them as toys to older adults building them to assemble large collections. In the United States, as well as some other countries, many modelers are former members of the military who like to recreate the actual equipment they used in service.

Technological advances have made model-building more and more sophisticated, and the proliferation of expensive detailing add-ons have raised the bar for competition within modeling clubs. As a result, a kit built "out of the box" on a weekend cannot compare with a kit built over months where a tiny add-on part such as an aircraft seat can cost more than the entire kit itself.

Though plastic modeling is generally an uncontroversial hobby, it's not immune to social pressures:

- In the 1990s, various countries banned Formula One race cars from carrying advertising for tobacco sponsors. In response, manufacturers such as Tamiya removed tobacco logo decals from their race car kits, even those of cars which appeared before the tobacco ban.
- The Nazi swastika, which appears on World War 2 Luftwaffe aircraft, is illegal to display in Germany, and disappeared from almost all manufacturers' box illustrations in the 1990s. Some makers still include the emblem on the decal sheet, others have "broken" it into two elements which must be reassembled by the builder, while others have omitted it altogether. Aftermarket decal sheets exist that consist entirely of Luftwaffe swastikas.
- A long lasting legal conflict exists between aerospace corporations and the manufacturers of plastic models. Manufacturers of aircraft have sought royalties from model makers for using their designs and intellectual property in their kits. Hobbyists argue that model kits provide free advertising for the makers of the real vehicles and that any royalties collected would be insignificant compared to the profits made from aircraft construction contracts. They also argue that forcing manufacturers to pay royalties and licensing fees would financially ruin all but the largest model kit makers. Some proponents of the aerospace industry contest that the issue is not of financial damages, but of intellectual property and brand image. In contrast, most of the world's commercial airlines allow their fleet to be modeled, as a form of publicity. Many cottage industry manufacturers, particularly of sci-fi subjects, avoid the issue by selling their products under generic untrademarked names (e.g. selling a figure that clearly depicts Batman as "Bat Hero Figure"). Similarly, automobile manufacturers occasionally make an effort to collect royalties from companies modeling their products.
- The UK's Ministry of Defence prohibits use of its logos and insignias on commercial products without permission, and according to its licensing policy model and decal manufacturers are required to pay a license fee in order to use Royal Air Force insignia or insignias and logos of any other military unit that was or is a sub-unit of the UK's MOD.

== See also ==
- Model aircraft
- Ship model
- Model military vehicle
- Armor Modeling and Preservation Society
- International Plastic Modellers' Society (IPMS)
- List of scale model kit manufacturers
- List of model aircraft manufacturers
- Gunpla
- Frame Arms Girl
