= Model building =

Hobby

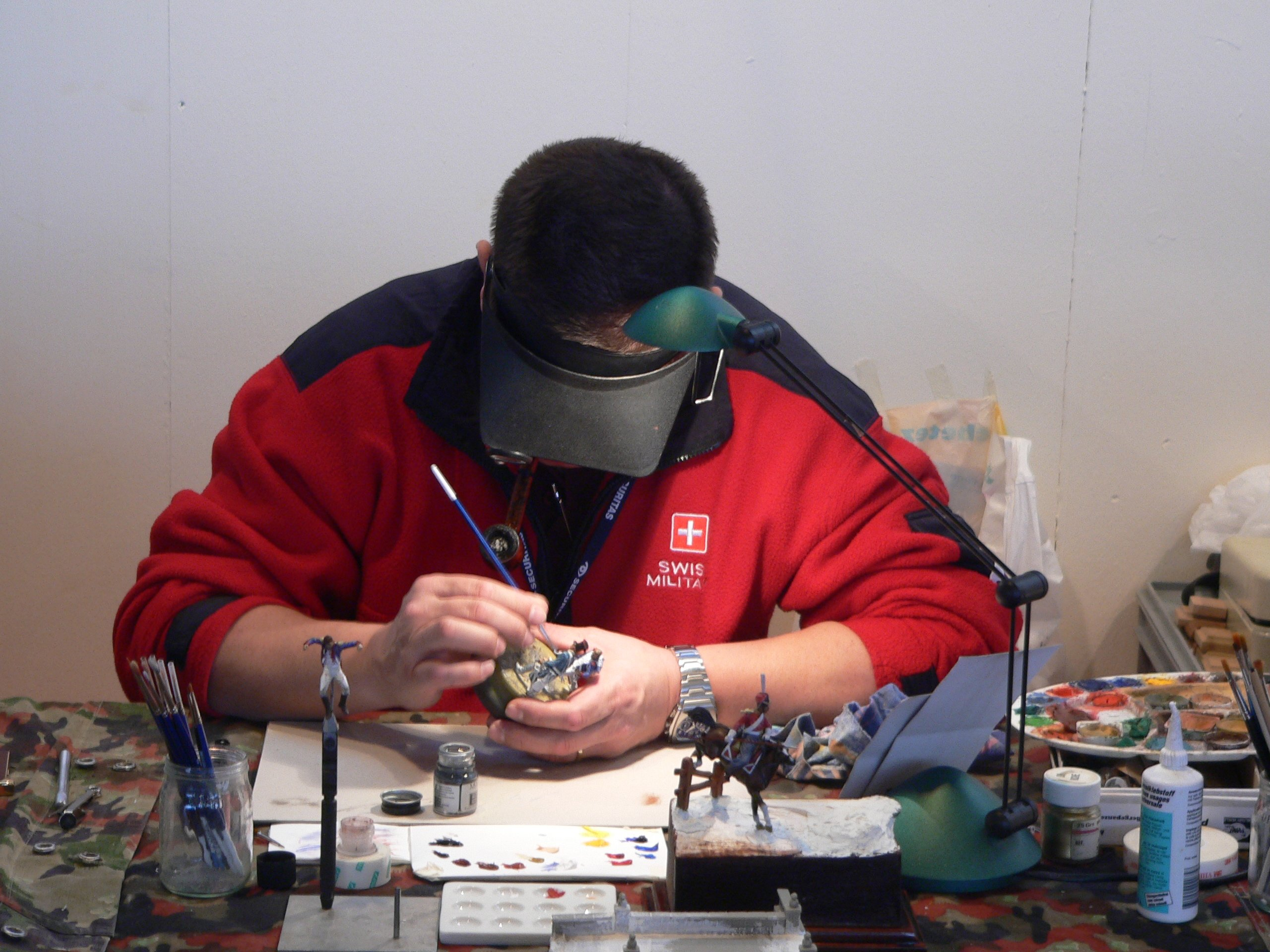
A builder working on a model

Model building is a hobby and career that involves the creation of physical models either from kits or from materials and components acquired by the builder. The kits contain several pieces that need to be assembled in order to make a final model. Most model-building categories have a range of common scales that make them manageable for the average person both to complete and display. A model is generally considered a physical representation of an object and maintains accurate relationships between all of its aspects.

The model building kits can be classified according to skill levels that represent the degree of difficulty for the hobbyist. These include skill level 1 with snap-together pieces that do not require glue or paint; skill level 2, which requires glue and paint; and, skill level 3 kits that include smaller and more detailed parts. Advanced skill levels 4 and 5 kits ship with components that have extra-fine details. Particularly, level 5 requires expert-level skills.

== Model building as career ==
Model building is not exclusively a hobbyist pursuit. The complexity of assembling representations of actual objects has become a career for several people, and is heavily applicable in film making. There are, for instance, those who build models/props to commemorate historic events, employed to construct models using past events as a basis to predict future events of high commercial interest.

== The categories of modelling include ==
- Scale model building
- Live steam models
- Model engineering
- Matchstick models
- Military models
- Model aircraft
- Model cars
- Model construction vehicles
- Building models
- Architectural models
- Lego
- Model figures
- Model military vehicles
- Rail transport modelling
- Model rockets
- Ship models
- Cardboard engineering
- Firearm models (such as airsoft guns)
- Gundam models
- Miniature effect, for filmmaking purposes
