= James Hay Stevens =

Aviation journalist (1913–1973)

James Hay Stevens CEng FRAeS (10 November 1913 – 1973) was an aviation journalist, editor of Aircraft Engineering (1945-1957) magazine, illustrator and pilot. He created the Skybirds range of 1:72 scale model aircraft kits produced by A. J. Holladay & Co., the same scale later being adopted by Airfix. Between 1938-1939 he contributed articles and illustrations to Air Stories magazine, and between 1959–1967, he contributed articles to the newspaper The Times.

In 1933 he attended the College of Aeronautical Engineering in Chelsea, earning a first-class diploma for practice and theory.

He lived in Borehamwood.

== Bibliography ==
- James Hay Stevens, The shape of the aeroplane, Publ. Hutchinson 1953, 302 pages
- James Hay Stevens, Maurice F. Allward, How and why of aircraft and their engines, Publisher Putnam, 1952, 124 pages
- James Hay Stevens, Aircraft recognition test and cut-away drawings of Spitfire, Hurricane and Lysandeer, Publ. Air Training Corps Gazette, 1941
- James Hay Stevens, Scale model aircraft, Publisher J. Hamilton ltd., 1933, 88 pages
