= Academy Plastic Model =

South Korean plastic model and toy manufacturer

Academy Plastic Model Co., Ltd
- Company type: Private
- Industry: Research and Development, Manufacturing, Sales and Promotion
- Founded: 1969
- Founder: Soon Hwan Kim
- Headquarters: Uijeongbu, Korea
- Key people: Soon Hwan Kim, President
- Products: Scale plastic Model Kits, Radio Control Model Kits, Educational Construction Kits, Toys
- Website: http://www.academy.co.kr

Academy Plastic Model Co., Ltd. (Korean: 아카데미과학주식회사) is a Korean plastic model, chemical, and toy company. It is headquartered in Uijeongbu-Si, Gyeonggi-do, Korea and was established on September 1, 1969. It holds three headquarters: in Seoul, Korea; Gelsenkirchen, Germany; and Rosario, Cavite, Philippines. Academy has developed and supplied over 500 products to more than 60 countries worldwide, and since 1989, Academy has won several Modell des Jahres awards for its product quality. Academy manufacturers plastic model kits, radio controlled cars, battery- and solar-powered educational models, sailboat models, acrylic and enamel model paints, airsoft guns, and various modelling tools and supplies.

== See also ==
- Mini 4WD
- Model car
- Model military vehicle
- Airfix
- AMT
- Aurora
- ESCI
- FROG
- VEB Plasticart
- Hasegawa
- Heller
- Italeri
- Jo-Han
- Matchbox
- Model Products Corporation
- Monogram
- Tamiya
- Zvezda
