= Skybirds =

British brand of scale models

A. J. Holladay & Co. (Skybirds)
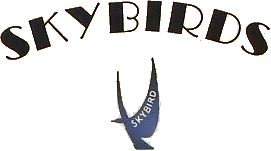
- Founded: 1932
- Defunct: 1945; 81 years ago
- Headquarters: British
- Products: Die-cast scale model vehicles, figurines
- Brands: Skybirds

Skybirds was a brand name for a series of 1:72 scale wood and metal aircraft model kits produced during the 1930s and 1940s, manufactured by the A. J. Holladay & Co.

Some of the Skybird-branded products were die-cast scale model cars, aircraft, military vehicles, figurines, among others.

== History ==
These kits were designed by pilot and aviation journalist James Hay Stevens and comprised shaped wooden blanks with cast metal detail parts. The kits were intended to educate their assemblers of the aircraft. They were designed to be built similarly to real aircraft construction. The kits were supposedly approved by "educational and air-minded organisations". These were the first model aircraft kits in the world made to a constant scale of 1:72. This scale was later adopted by many other model manufacturers, such as Frog and Airfix.

Around 80 different Skybirds kits were released from 1932 onwards, marketed towards those aged 12 and over. Subjects ranged from First World War to Second World War military aircraft, plus a number of inter-war period civilian types.

The company endorsed the foundation of clubs, specifically for model-making. Together, these formed the Skybird League which had its own magazine of which new issues were published four times a year. Photographs of aircraft models built could be submitted into competitions, in order to be displayed within the windows of the Hamleys toyshop in London.

It was marvelled, by customers, that a photograph of a completed model, if finished properly, looked identical to the original article. Of course, this was somewhat easier to achieve with a completed model in the 1930s due to the fact that all photography was monochromatic. The kits encouraged photographers to experiment with scale and trickery to make the model seem more like an actual vehicle. Magazine readers sent their photographs to Skybirds, hoping them to be published within an upcoming issue. Modellers were also encouraged to produce a diorama of their completed vehicle, setting it amidst scratch-built accessories. During the Second World War, modelling became a vital part of morale for children. They could participate within the dogfights above them during the Battle of Britain. It is possible that model making popularised the Supermarine Spitfire, despite it being statistically out-performed and out-numbered throughout the conflict by the, then, more-successful Hawker Hurricane.

Manufacture ceased in 1942, and in 1945 the company closed but was soon relaunched under new management. However the Skybirds range did not survive the company's acquisition by Zang shortly afterwards.
