= Armor Modeling and Preservation Society =

AMPS logo.

The Armor Modeling and Preservation Society (AMPS) is a social club with the common interest of modeling miniature armored fighting vehicles, military model figures, ordnance, dioramas, and related equipment and promotion of historic military vehicle restoration. AMPS is an international club headquartered in the United States

== History and purpose ==
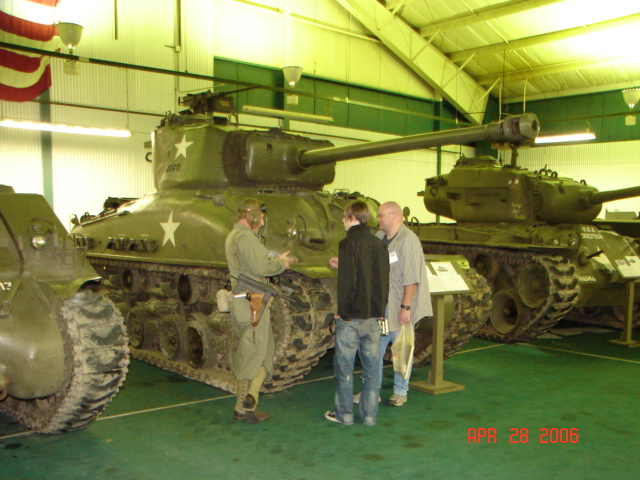
Several AMPS members talking with a museum volunteer in front of a World War II-vintage Sherman tank.

Clubs centered around the hobby of modeling have existed since the 1950s. The Armor Modeling and Preservation Society, Inc. was founded in 1993 by armor modelers as a means of promoting the hobby using the 'open system' of contest judging.

In 2023, AMPS celebrated its 30th Anniversary during the annual International Convention. An anniversary banner was added to the AMPS logo to commemorate the occasion.

AMPS was formed as a membership club to promote the hobby of armor modeling, with bylaws that prevented any officer from deriving their income from the hobby of military vehicle modeling. The club operated without incorporation until early 2007, when it was incorporated as a not-for-profit corporation in the state of New York. In 2011 AMPS gained recognition from the US federal government as a 501(c)(4) tax-exempt organization.

AMPS has several purposes:

- The first is a social function, providing a means for those interested in the hobby of model military vehicle building (including model figure building as well as diorama building), historic vehicle restoration and associating with other hobbyists.
- A second is educational; AMPS events and publications provide detailed historical information on actual armored fighting vehicles, ordnance, and the history of their usage, as well as providing techniques for improving scale models, figures and dioramas.
- Finally, AMPS provides some funding for restoration of actual military vehicles and makes charitable contributions to morale-building efforts for service members serving in combat areas (see below).

== Structure and membership ==
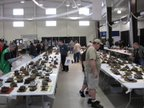
The model display area at the 2008 AMPS International convention.

The AMPS bylaws and constitution provide for an Executive Board consisting of a President, First Vice-President, eight regional Second Vice Presidents, and a Secretary. Additional non-elected officers include Treasurer, Publications Editor, and Marketing Director/Public Information Officer, Web Master and Chief Judge. The founder and first President of AMPS was Steven "Cookie" Sewell.

Membership is open to anyone with an interest in the hobby. Annual membership fees are $30 for members in the United States, $35 in Canada and $40 in other countries. Almost all members are located in the USA, Canada, the UK and Mexico. Currently, AMPS has just over 700 members.

=== Local chapters ===
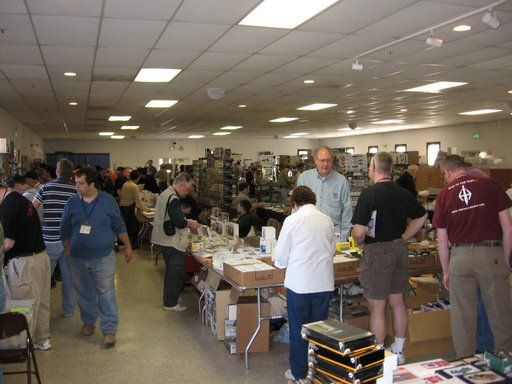
The vendor area at the 2007 International show

AMPS members often form local 'chapters' of the society. These local clubs operate as part of AMPS but their local base allow their members to meet (usually monthly) and share hobby skills, materials and references.

Current active AMPS chapters and affiliate chapters include:

- Chattanooga Scale Modelers: Chattanooga, Tennessee area
- Minuteman AMPS: [Hudson, Massachusetts], area
- KCAMPS: Kansas City, Missouri
- AMPS Centex, Austin, Texas (Austin Armor Builders Society)
- Patton's Best/AMPS Louisville, Louisville, Kentucky
- AMPS Albany, Albany, New York
- AMPS-Chicagoland, Chicago, Illinois area
- AMPS Indy, Indianapolis, Indiana
- CVAMPS, Central Virginia AMPS (Richmond area)
- AMPS Mexico (Mexico City area)
- AMPS Dallas, Texas
- AMPS Eastern Pennsylvania
- AMPS Atlanta, Georgia
- AMPS Frontiersman, Buffalo, New York
- Central Florida AMPS
- Washington Armor Club (Washington D.C. area)
- AMPS SoCal Los Angeles, California area
- Western Front AMPS San Jose, California
- AMPS Ottawa: Ottawa, Ontario, Canada
- AMPS Southwestern Ontario, London, Ontario, Canada
- AMPS New Zealand
- AMPS Paris, France
- AMPS Northwest, Tacoma, Washington
- BRAG (Blue Ridge Armor Geeks): Lynchburg, Virginia
- AMPS Israel
- AMPS Tijuana, Mexico
- Lone Star Armor Brigade (AMPS San Antonio), San Antonio, Texas

=== Benefits of membership ===
Membership in AMPS gives the modelers several benefits:

a) Voting rights in the society. AMPS members vote on officers and thus the direction of the society.
b) Discounted admission to all AMPS shows.
c) Discounted pricing from numerous armor-modeling-related firms who have partnered with AMPS.
d) Six issues per year of the society journal, 'Boresight, four digital and two hardcopies.

== Publications ==
AMPS publishes a semi-monthly journal, Boresight. Articles in Boresight are written by the members, and the publication itself is edited by volunteers. The journal typically provides several articles on real armored vehicles for reference purposes, along with modeling articles and how-to guides. AMPS accepts advertising in Boresight as a means of providing discounted hobby products to its members. Initially the publication was produced in a black and white format, the magazine is now a professionally produced publication an all color format, with two haredcopies and four digitally formatted editions.

AMPS also has an official society Facebook page at https://www.facebook.com/AMPSArmor/

== Events ==
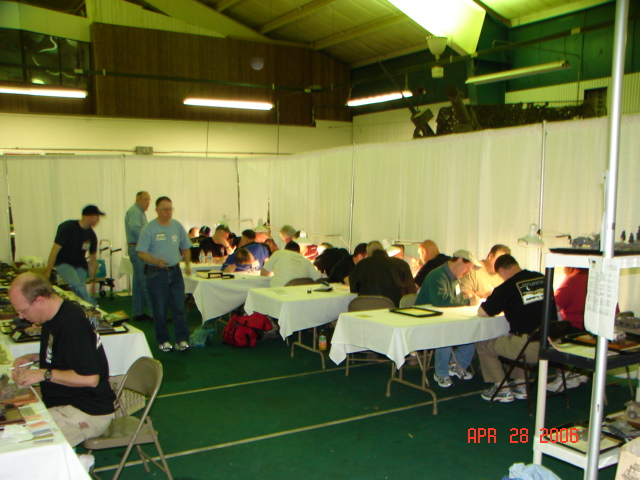
The "Judging Pit" in which model entries are evaluated; this example is at the AMPS 2006 International Convention

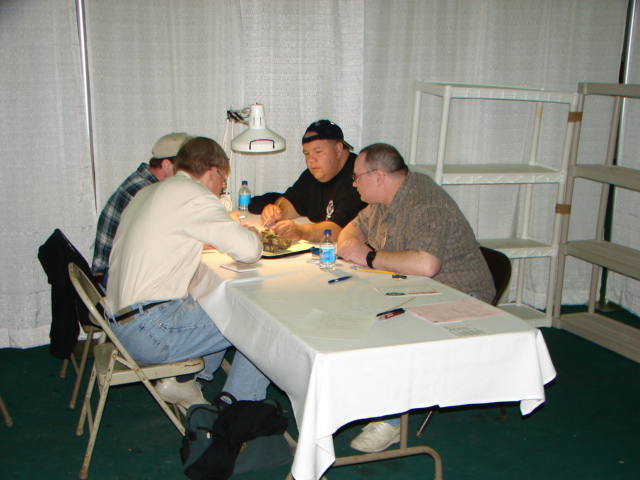
Judges evaluating a model entry at the AMPS 2006 International Convention

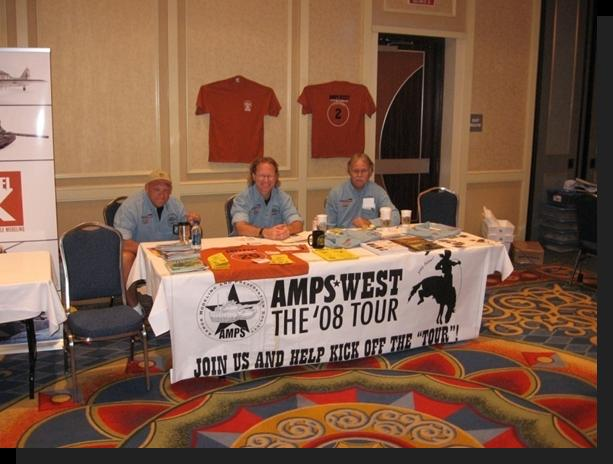
AMPS informational table at the IPMS-USA National convention, Anaheim California, Aug 2007

The major event hosted by AMPS is the annual International Convention, usually held within the April - May timeframe. This three-day show brings together hundreds of members to view models, participate in a model contest, buy hobby products, view actual military vehicles, and attend seminars. Non-members are welcome and encouraged to attend the conventions, but are restricted from entering models into the contest until they gain membership. Recent international conventions have included over 600 scale models on display. Seminar speakers usually include tank crew veterans, well-known modelers and researchers, and industry representatives from firms such as Tamiya and AFV Club.

Smaller regional and local contests are also held from time to time, typically attracting 100+ scale models for single-day events.

- Armorcon, formerly known as AMPS East is an East Coast USA show, held annually since 1999, normally in the western Connecticut (in recent years) or northern New Jersey (formerly) area.
- AMPS Centex is a midwest show held in Austin, Texas every other year.
- Kansas City AMPS holds a show every October in Kansas City, Missouri.
- AMPS Atlanta holds a show each February since 2009.
- Central Virginia AMPS has held three regionals in the Richmond, Virginia area

The scale models entered in the contest are judged according to the AMPS Contest Rules, and may be awarded Gold, Silver or Bronze medals. Scale models are judged for accuracy, level of detail, skill in construction, and paint/markings finish. Some of these models take hundreds of hours to complete. Each modeler is provided with a feedback form showing the points given in each area and what areas need to improve. An 'open' system of judging is used in which each model competes against a standard, not against other entries. Thus, instead of 1st, 2nd and 3rd-place medals, awards are given to all models that reach specified cutoff scores. Since participants are not competing against one another, there is no disincentive to the sharing of techniques and ideas.

The feedback provided in these events is a key factor in helping modelers improve. The AMPS system provides formal feedback, giving specific information about what to improve in the model.

=== AMPS Masters ===
An 'AMPS Master' is a modeler who has either won "Best of Show" at the AMPS convention or who is recognized by AMPS as a Master-level modeler due to other accomplishments. The current AMPS Masters (recognized as masters although never 'Best of Show' winners) are:

Tony Englehart

Mark Ford

Paul Gaertner

Dave Kahn

Dave Lockhart

Mike McFadden

Mark Muller

Mike Roof

Stephen 'Cookie' Sewell

Dan Tisoncik

Steve Zaloga

Masters awarded at conventions are:

1995: Ken Davis

1996: Bob Collignon

1997: Dave Dean

1998: Bob Clifton

1999: Mike Siggins and Chris Mrosko

2000: Roger Lang

2001: Lynn Kessler

2002: Charlie Prichett

2003: Jason Jennings

2004: Douglas Lee

2005: Alexander DeLeon

2006: Don Barclay

2007: Mark Hazzard

2008: Steve Milstone-Turner

2009: Tom Jett

2010: Mark Corbett

2011: Cesar (Manny) Rodriguez

2012: Jim Weschler

2013: John Kesner

2014: Chris Durden

2015: Dave Vickers

2016: Tony Zadro

2017: Todd Michalak

2018: Harvey Low

2019: Scott Bregi

NO AMPS Show from 2020-2021 Due to COVID-19

2022: Jeff Feller

2023: Greg Hanchuk

2024: Stan Spooner

== Charitable activities ==
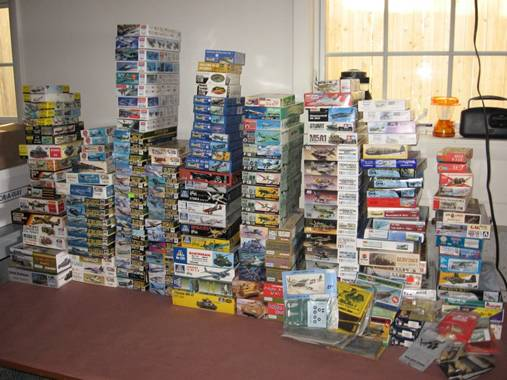
A few of the over 1,500 kits AMPS members have donated to Coalition troops in Iraq.

Previously AMPS recently launched a clearinghouse project that gathered donations of plastic model kits and supplies for shipment to United States military personnel deployed to combat areas. Nearly 2000 kits and hundreds of supply items and books have been sent overseas to help morale and alleviate stress and boredom.

== See also ==
- Model military vehicle
- Diorama
- US Army Ordnance Museum
- Armored fighting vehicles
- Tank
- History of the tank
- Self-propelled artillery
- Armored warfare
- International Plastic Modellers' Society (IPMS)
