= 1:72 scale =

Scale used for scale models

1:72 scale is a scale used for scale models, most commonly model aircraft, where one inch on the model equals six feet (which is seventy-two inches) in real life. The scale is popular for aircraft because sizes ranging from small fighters to large bombers are all reasonably manageable and displayable.

== History ==
This scale originated with the Skybirds and Frog Penguin aircraft model ranges produced in the United Kingdom during the 1930s and was subsequently used for aircraft recognition models by the Allies of World War II. More subjects and genres are covered in this scale than any other. Widespread in Western and Eastern Europe, Japan and Latin America, the scale is extremely popular in the UK.

Manufacturers of aircraft kits, past and present, in 1:72 scale include; Airfix, Frog, Novo, Revell, Italeri, Tamiya, Hasegawa, Heller, Monogram and Matchbox.

In the early 1970s, this scale also gained popularity for model military vehicles, and is also used for Japanese anime science fiction models, die-cast model cars, figures, and radio-control model ships, as well as soldiers.

== Die-cast models ==
1:72 scale is becoming increasingly popular for die-cast toys. The beginning of die-cast production in this scale can be connected to the noted Hong Kong model car producer Hongwell Company, which opened its factory dedicated to these model cars in 1997.

The success of this scale in the die-cast market has multiple reasons. One of them is that these models may be precisely designed using Zamak as a basic alloy, which is a real advantage in contrast to 1:87. The other reason is that these models are sold in perspex boxes that can easily be organized into columns, thus helping collectors to keep their collection in good condition.

Unlike 1:64, 1:72 die-cast models are strictly produced in true scale even if they do not fit the original box size. The number of complementary plastic parts (lamps, mirrors) and a higher amount of screen printed decorations make these models much more lifelike, yet still allow them to be produced in large numbers so they may also be used as toys.

Emergency vehicle models started a new way of collecting in this scale. As most of the manufacturers offered emergency models in the local markets in local liveries, swapping these cars soon became an everyday procedure in the lives of collectors. As a result, international online communities for 1:72 die-cast models are more popular than for older scales.

The best-known manufacturers in this scale are Hongwell (Cararama brand), Real-X, Yat Ming and Realtoy. Other brands such as Schuco, Abrex, Bumi Cars or Motorart also have these models in their portfolio but the manufacturers behind these brands are Hongwell or Yat Ming. Italian Bburago also announced its 1:72 scale range at the 2005 International Nuremberg Toy Fair. This product line would have been a spin-off of Schuco's Junior Line extending the portfolio with the models of Real-X. As Bburago was sold by Dickie-Schuco Group shortly afterwards, these models never reached the European market under the Italian brand name.

== 1:72 and HO/OO scale ==
There has been some confusion amongst manufacturers in the past in terms of railway and scale model scales. Railway scales are identified by alpha/numeric codes whereas all other modeling scales are simply identified by the scale concerned. HO in Australia, Europe, Japan, and the United States is 1:87. The UK had its own scale of OO, which is 1:76, but uses the same track gauge as HO scale. Hence the term HO/OO. None of these scales are 1:72, and neither are they compatible with it, as a comparison between an Airfix and Revell GMBH Leopard I tank kits will demonstrate. Even figures in these scales show distinct size differences. Many manufacturers in the past, particularly in the UK, produced items to 1:76 and labeled the packaging as being 1:72, because the scales were historically considered to be close. An example is Airfix's and Matchbox's series of vehicle kits to 1:76, which were eventually re-issued with labeling indicating a scale of 1:72. 1:76 still exists, but it is now considered to be a wargaming scale.

Many scale model manufacturers now recognize the difference and there has been a marked change over the last 10 years, with vehicle and figure producers consolidating to 1:72. Currently a large number of manufacturers produce figures in this scale such as Caesar Miniatures, HaT, Italeri and Zvezda

== See also ==
- Miniature model (gaming)
- Scale model
- Model aircraft
- List of scale model sizes

== Publications ==
- Lune, Peter van. "FROG Penguin plastic scale model kits 1936 - 1950". Zwolle, The Netherlands, 2017, published by author ISBN 978-90-9030180-8
