= Trumpeter (company) =

Chinese company

- Headquarters: Zhongshan, China
- Parent: ZhongShan YaTai Electric Appliances Co., Ltd.
- Website: trumpeter-china.com

Trumpeter is a Chinese company that manufactures plastic injection moulded scale model kits. Their product line consists of model ships, aircraft, cars and military ground vehicles. The company is located in Zhongshan, China, just north of Macau. All of the design and development is done at this site, with production facilities including full mold making engineering using spark erosion techniques. The factory carries out most work from computer design through to packaging, with some outsourcing of, for example, photo etched parts. The company also manufactures under licence for other brands.
