= Model figure =

Scale model of a person or creature

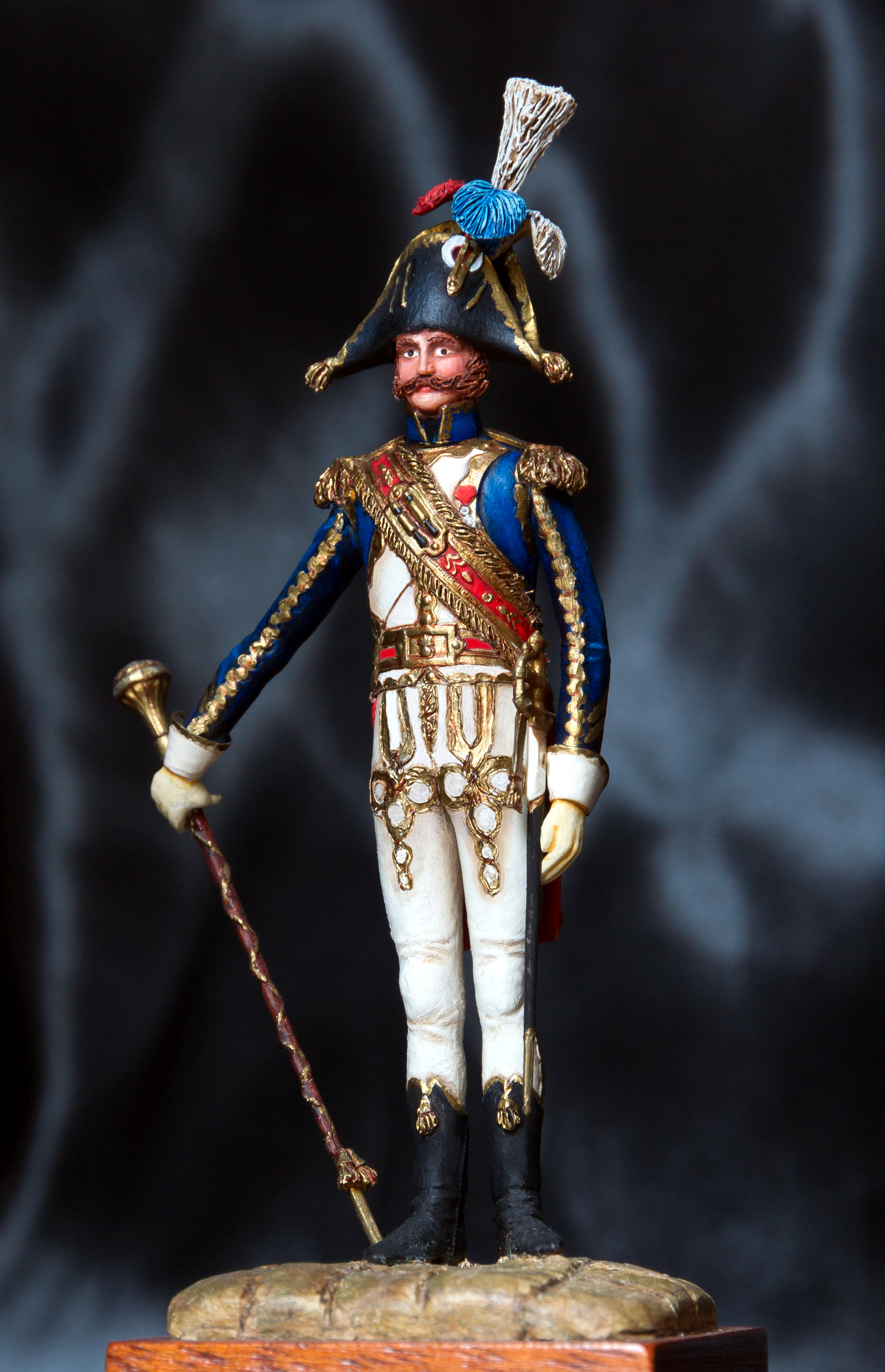
- A custom model of French soldier Jean Nicolas Sénot (fr:Jean Nicolas Sénot)
- Type: Scale model figurine
- Invented by: Unknown
- Company: Bif Bang Pow!; Britains; Hasbro; McFarlane; NECA
- Availability: ?–present
- Materials: Polystyrene; Polyurethane resin; Metal; Porcelain
- Features: Human and other creatures

A model figure is a scale model representing a human, monster or other creature. Human figures may be either a generic figure of a type (such as "World War II Luftwaffe pilot"), a historical personage (such as "King Henry VIII"), or a fictional character (such as "Conan").

Model figures are sold both as kits for enthusiast to construct and paint and as pre-built, pre-painted collectable figurines. Model kits may be made in plastic (usually polystyrene), polyurethane resin, or metal (including white metal); collectables are usually made of plastic, porcelain, or (rarely) bronze.

There are larger size (12-inch or 30 cm tall) that have been produced for recent movie characters (Princess Leia from Star Wars, for example). Large plastic military figures are made by some model soldier manufacturers as a sideline.

== Military models ==
Enthusiasts may pursue figure modeling in its own right or as an adjunct to military modeling.

There is also overlap with miniature figures (minis) used in wargames and role-playing games: minis are usually less than 54 mm scale, and do not necessarily represent any given personage.

Back in the early '80s and '90s military modeling figures were largely produced in 1:72 and 1:35 scales with other scales such as 1:48 and 1:32 holding a smaller market share. Typically 1:48 scale was reserved for aircraft and aircraft support vehicles with figures being maintenance and flight crews while 1:32 scale miniatures were composed largely of vehicles such as tanks and their crews.

1:35 scale miniatures were produced by many companies such as Tamiya, Testor's, Revell, Monogram and others. Kits of soldiers, vehicles and combinations covered World War I through Vietnam with the largest portion centering on World War II. 1/72 scale miniatures covered a much wider and diverse range of time periods with Atlantic offering figures of Ancient Egyptians, Greeks, Romans, Cowboys, American Indians and many more. Other company's such as Airfix supplied not only high-quality figures in 1:72 scale but also fine planes and military vehicles and still do so today. One of the largest distinctions between 1:72 scale and 1:35 scale aside from the obvious size was the amount of ready-to-paint dioramas and sets available to small-scale modelers. Airfix, a leader in the small-scale model market offered several kits for modelers from pontoon bridges, the Atlantic wall, Waterloo, and many others. These kits came with everything a hobbyist would need to portray a given moment from buildings and trees to vehicles and men. None of these were available to the larger scale modeler.

Tamiya, a higher-end supplier of military vehicle and soldier kits, has, in the past few years, taken 1:48 scale modeling a step further offering an interesting line of German and American World War II figures and vehicles making it possible to incorporate tanks, jeeps, and foot soldiers into dioramas with aircraft, something which was only possible in 1:72 scale for quite a long time. For the serious military modeler this opens a new realm of possibilities in diorama making.

The same growth in availability is true for 1:32 scale as well. For quite a while 1:32 scale figures were more or less better versions of the army men children play with. Kits came as single-cast figures molded as a unit instead of the ready-to-assemble versions found at 1:48 and 1:35 scale where arms, helmets and gear must be cut from plastic sprues and glued together. 1:32 scale soldiers were often slightly lower quality than their 1:35 scale counterparts as they were molded from a softer plastic allowing things like rifle barrels to bend while the soldiers sat in the boxes. 1:32 scale kits were limited and this made extensive modeling difficult. Lately, 1:32 scale modeling has made a large push to expand as companies now sell these figures professionally pre-painted making them exceptional for large-scale military gaming of all sorts. In fact, the diorama industry has started supplying pre-painted diorama scenery as well making high-quality 1:32 scale diorama making much easier than ever before.

Figure model kits can be as large as 1:16 scale. These kits include motorized vehicles and stand alone figures. Kits of this size take a great deal of effort and time to paint as lengths must be taken to get the details of the paint job precise whereas with smaller kits, while details is still essential, there is less to be done.

Many model figures used for gaming are measured in millimeters ranging from 15 to 80 mm with miniature wargaming figures running on the smaller end especially where armored vehicles are used. Traditional modelers tend to stick to the more common 1:72-1:32 scales leaving the other sizes to the gamers.

As with all things, quality and price vary from manufacturer to manufacturer and the result of a model is often limited by its initial quality. Today many new model manufacturers take great lengths to make 1:72, 1:48, 1:35 and 1:32 scale models as highly detailed and realistic as possible. This, unfortunately, makes many of the older, still existing sets, less desirable for diorama making but still fun to build, especially as starter kits for a less experienced modeller. Many of these older kits can still be found online at a reasonable price and while they don't offer as many pieces or as highly detailed molding, they can still produce a respectable product after paint and proper weathering is administered.

Model aircraft and vehicle kits in even smaller scales will also often include "model figures," or can be purchased as accessories. There are also kits of the drivers and servicers of cars, and the series of figurines that stand in the streets and platforms of model railroads.

== Japanese figures ==
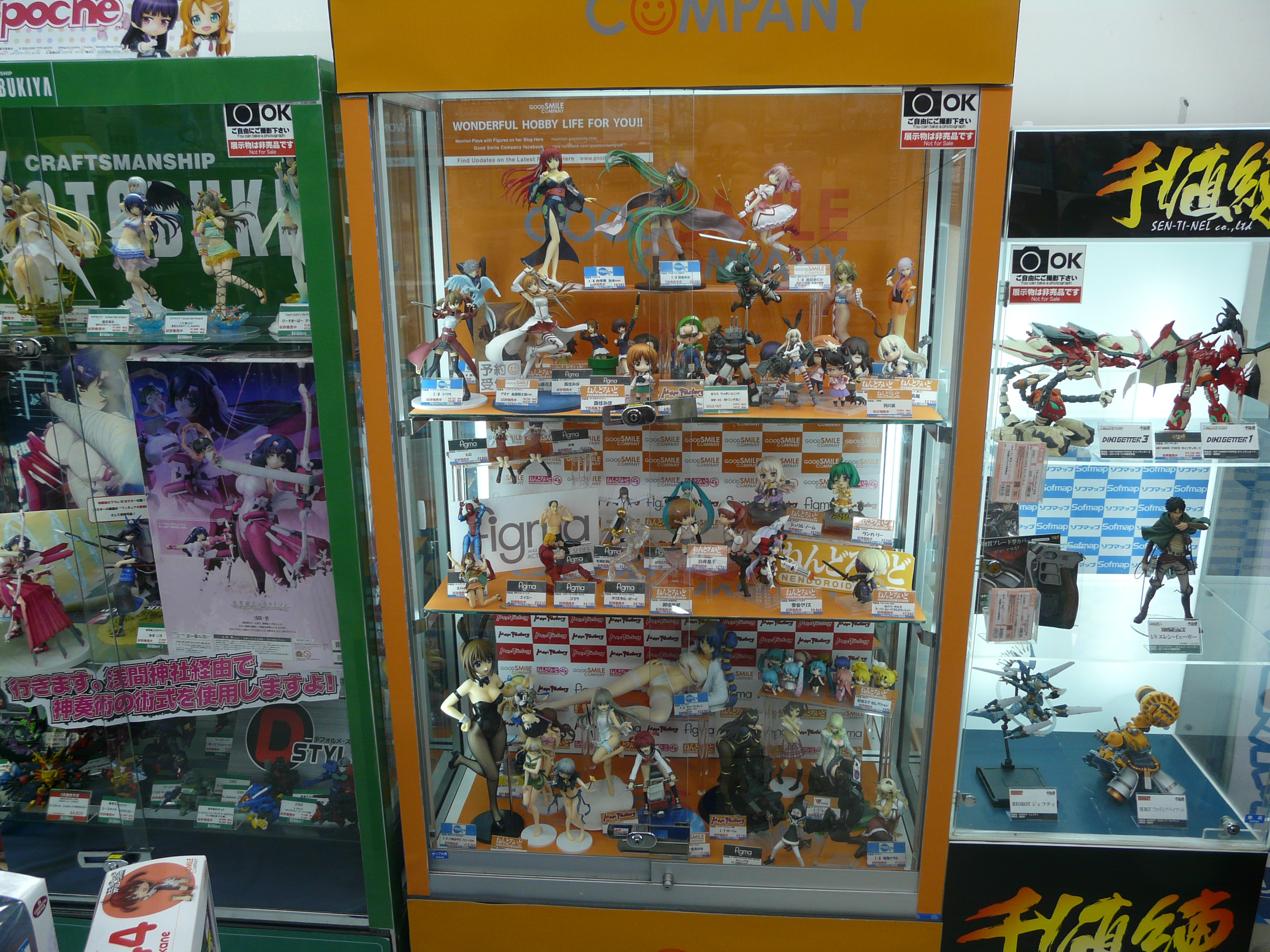
Display cases featuring typical Japanese anime and manga figurines

Model figures based on icons like Hello Kitty, as well as characters appearing in anime, manga, kaiju (monster) series, science fiction/fantasy films and video games, is a major part of otaku fandom. It's also a large part of the global animation merchandising market from Japan which is estimated to be worth around 663 billions Japanese yen. Some hobbyists concentrate specifically on a certain type of figure, such as garage kits, gashapon (capsule toys), or PVC bishōjo (pretty girl) statues. Such figures prominently featured in work of modern artist Takashi Murakami. Through his company Kaikai Kiki, he has produced a number of limited designer toys to be sold in otaku oriented stores.

While many different companies manufacture and sell anime figures, prices for the same figure have large differences depending on the authenticity and quality of the figure. Authentic figures are normally figures of characters that are licensed by the creators, thus leading to significantly higher prices. Some of the most well known manufacturers for their consistency and quality are such as Good Smile Company, Aniplex, Hot Toys, Bandai and others. Figures are usually classified as prize figures, scale figures and others, with prize figures being lower cost options often used in Claw crane games, while scale figures can cost several hundreds to thousands USD.

=== Noodle stopper ===
A noodle stopper is a type of figurine based on manga, anime, or even video game characters which is ostensibly meant to secure by gravity to the lid of ramen containers so that they do not boil over. Due to their ornate designs, they are often displayed as ordinary figurines. (Stopper is a misnomer, as they are not inserted into the container.)

== Garage kits ==
Garage kit figures are produced by both amateurs and professionals, and usually cast out of polyurethane resin. In Japan they often portray anime characters and in the US they are often movie monsters. Garage kits are usually produced in limited numbers and are more expensive than typical injection molded plastic figures and kits.

== US history ==
In the 50s and 60s plastic model kits such as cars, planes or space ships became common in the US. There were also cheap plastic models for the popular market of movie monsters, comic book heroes, and movie and television characters in 1:8 size (about 9 inches or 23 cm in height). These included monsters like Frankenstein, The Wolf Man, Dracula, and the Creature from the Black Lagoon. One of the largest producers of monster figures were the Aurora Plastics Corporation, who produced many thousands figures from each mould. This market disappeared and no firm since has produced anything to match their quantities. Instead smaller (3¾-inch or 10 cm) action figures of have taken over the popular market.

In the 1970s, Aurora's figure molds had been sold to Monogram and by the mid-to late 1970s, the models had been discontinued and were difficult to find in hobby stores.

In the mid-1980s some who were kids in the 1950s and 60s resumed their interest in the old Aurora monster models. An underground market developed through which enthusiasts could acquire the original plastic model kits. While the prices in the 50s and 60s had been only a few dollars, now the kits were selling for as much as $125 for some of the rarer monster models.

In the early to mid-1980s, hobbyists began creating their own garage kits of movie monsters, often without permission from copyright holders. They were usually produced in limited numbers and sold primarily by mail order and at toy and hobby conventions.

In the mid- to late 1980s, two model kit companies moved the monster model kit hobby toward the mainstream. Horizon Models in California and Screamin' Models in New York began licensing vinyl model kits of movie monsters. Horizon focused primarily on classic horror film characters (like Bride of Frankenstein, Invisible Man, The Phantom of the Opera) and comic book characters (like Captain America and Iron Man). Screamin' focused primarily on characters from more contemporary slasher movies like A Nightmare on Elm Street, Hellraiser and franchises like Star Wars and Mars Attacks. Hobby stores began to carry these products in limited supply.

By the 1990s model kits were produced in the US, UK as well as Japan and distributed through hobby and comic stores. Large hobby companies like AMT-Ertl and Revell/Monogram (the same Monogram that bought the Aurora monster molds) began marketing vinyl model kits of movie monsters, the classic Star Trek characters, and characters from one of the Batman films. There was an unprecedented variety of licensed models figure kits.

In the late 1990s model kit sales went down. Hobby and comic stores and their distributors began carrying fewer garage kits or closed down. Producers like Horizon and Screamin' shut their doors.

As of 2009, there are two American garage kit magazines, Kitbuilders Magazine and Amazing Figure Modeler, and there are garage kit conventions held each year, like WonderFest USA in Louisville, Kentucky.

== Model figure collecting ==
Model figure collectors, like most hobby collectors, usually have a specific criterion for what they collect, such as Civil-War soldiers, or Warhammer gaming figures.

Specifically with an eye to collectors, manufacturers of collectable model figures make chase figures. This is a model figure that is released in limited amounts relative to the rest of an assortment, often something like "one chase figure for every two cases of regular product" or similar. This is comparable to the chase cards in the collectible card game industry. The name comes from the assumption that collectors, in their need to "collect them all" will put in more effort than usual to "chase" down these figures.

Generally speaking, chase figures are rare in toy lines aimed at youth markets, although there are occasionally shortpacked figures (shipped in lower numbers than other figures in its release cycle). Chase figures are more common in collector-oriented lines like Marvel Legends and WWE Classics.

== See also ==
- Action figure
- Figurine
- Miniature figure (gaming)
- Toy soldier
