= Military miniaturism =

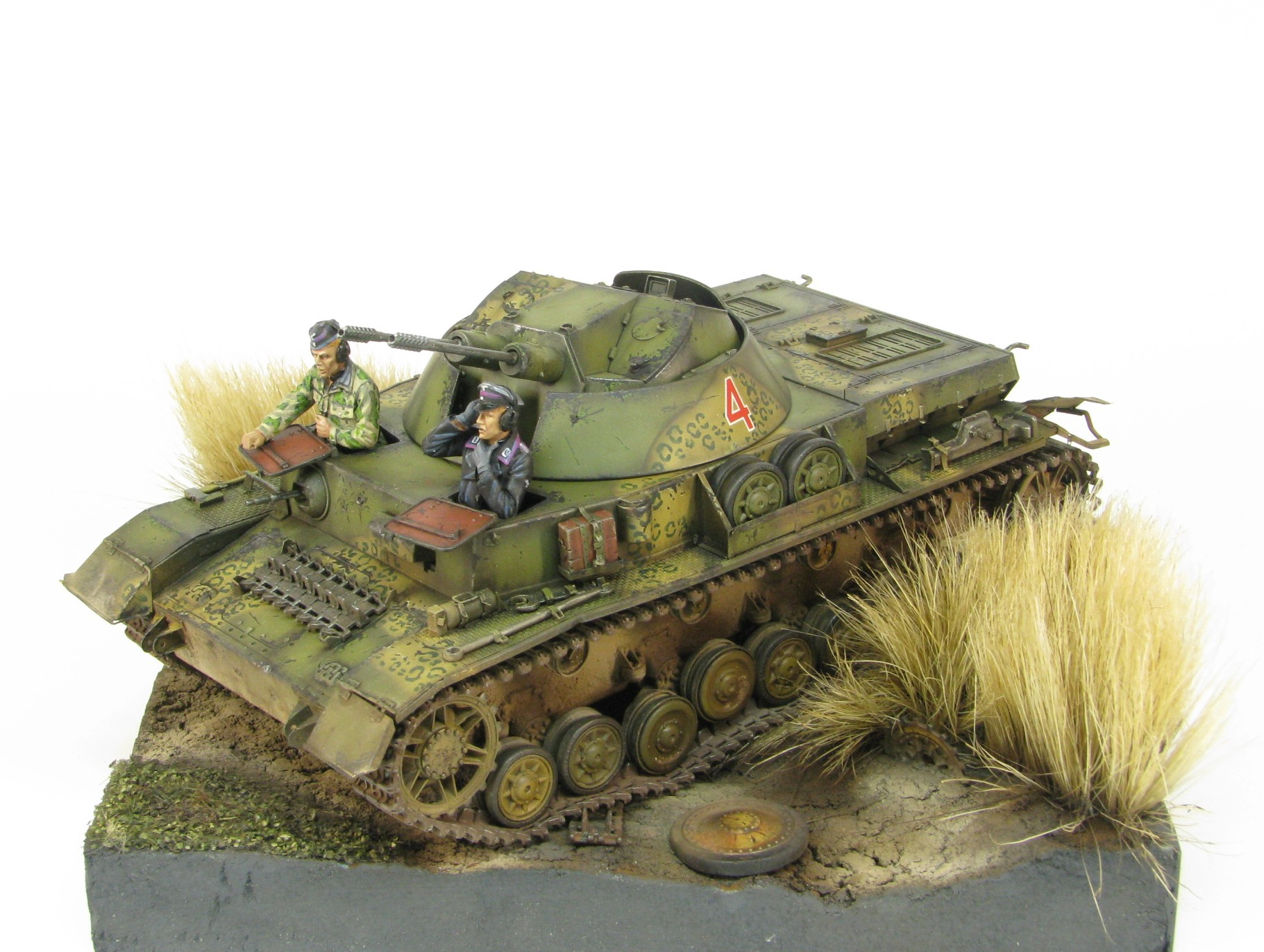
A small diorama of a model Kugelblitz in a field.

Military miniaturism is a niche within the broader hobby of modeling focusing on military subjects. It is itself a rather broad subject, dealing with any scale model of military theme. It has an ever growing range of sub-hobbies, including scale figure modeling, armour modeling, model ship building, military aviation modeling, and historical wargaming.

== Modeling ==
=== Building ===
Given the nature of military models, hobby practitioners for the most part lean toward realism in their creations. The way in which these creations are produced are nearly as wide as the hobby itself, ranging from building a model kit "from the box" to kitbashing to complete scratch building of a model. A wide range of kits are available on the market, with built results ranging from hyper-detailed representations of a subject to crude playthings. Aircraft kits tend to contain a cockpit interior, with some kits opting to include a full engine as well. Armor kit often feature workable hatches for crew figures, and a few contain fully detailed interiors. Prices also range greatly, from below $20 to over $100. Most modern kits, of all scales, are made mainly from a hard plastic (typically styrene) through injection molding. However, high end kits typically contain photoetch. Despite the general trend towards plastic, some kits are still made entirely from resin or white metal. There are even kits made entirely of photoetched metal on the market. Construction is typically carried out using plastic cement or cyanoacrylate ("super glue") to attach parts. Plastic parts normally require removal from a sprue use side cutters or a hobby knife. Parts are typically cleaned of seam lines and other imperfections from the molding process before attachment. Upon completion of a model, it is common practice to paint it (see "finishing").

=== Workshop ===
Scale modelling can be done in many places. Though, places with the following attributes can make for better places to model in:

Bench size – A bench or table large enough to fit the parts and tools needed to make a model.

Lighting – A well-lit, spacious area is an important aspect of a modelling workshop.

Storage containers – As mentioned above, models come with many items and parts, which may require being stored. Tools also need proper storage when not in use.

Seating – Some models—especially large ones—take large amounts of time, so comfortable seating is used to reduce fatigue.

=== Aftermarket kits ===
After market kits are add-ons to a main kit, meant to increase detail and correct incocities in the original kit. These kits come in many forms, but the most common materials used are white metal, resin and photoetched metal. Cast metal is typically used in replacement parts or to add small details, including main gun barrels and machine guns for armour models and wheel struts on aircraft. White metal has recently fallen out of favor on aftermarket kits in favor of resin. Resin pieces of models are typically produced either through molding or 3D printing. It is valued for its ability to hold crisp detail and be modified. Tires for vehicles, heads for figures, and assorted other details are available in resin. Photoetch is perhaps the most prevalent form of aftermarket goods, appearing in most detail kits and some full models. It consists of thin sheets of brass or nickel that have been laser etched into a firm yet bendable and highly detailed part. Given its versatility, photoetch is used in everything from seatbelts on aircraft, to engine grilles on armored vehicles.

=== Finishing ===
==== Painting ====
Painting scale models is common practice for modelers of all skill levels. The goal is to reproduce the historical color scheme and markings to individualize and increase the realism of the model. Many painting techniques have evolved to serve scale modelers. These techniques use near limitless application processes, varying the consistency, type of paint, and application method. Three main tools are used to apply paint: brushes, spray cans, and airbrushes. Brushes are favored for detail work and general paintwork. Spray paints are used to base coat models or dioramas. Airbrushes are used in a multitude of rolls, filling the niche taken by the spray can as well as giving the modeler the ability to lay down easier soft-edged lines and highlights. Types of paint used are also varied. some modelers prefer acrylic paint, while other prefer enamel paint, and yet more prefer oil paint. However, most hobbyists use a combination of 2, or all three to paint their models. The process of painting a model commonly begins with a primer to help paint adhere to the surface of a model. From there, base colors are applied in either a monotone or a camouflage scheme, depending on the subject. Depth is than added using highlights, shadows, and washes (thinned paint that acts on capillary action). Vehicle markings, including numbers and roundels, are often reproduced with waterslide decals.

==== Weathering ====
Weathering is the act of distressing a model to give it a "used" look. This skill is crucial in Military miniaturism, as it adds a level or realism necessary to replicate a combat worn object or person. Weathering comes in many forms, as it simply refers to anything that gives the model a look of use. This can come in the form of streaking, rust, mud, and staining among other things. Oil paints are popular for these tasks, due to their long working time. Oils are also often diluted to washes to add a filter or depth to a model. Enamel streaking washes are also popular. Homemade weathering pigments (made from pastels, as well as marketed pigments, are used to create mud and rust effects. Many textured paints are also available to add body to weathering effects.
