= Hasegawa Corporation =

Japanese model kit manufacturer

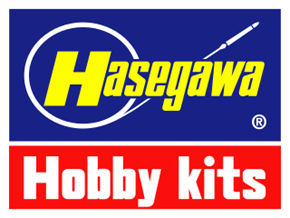
- Founded: 1941; 85 years ago
- Headquarters: Shizuoka, Japan
- Products: Scale plastic model cars, aircraft, ships, military vehicles
- Website: hasegawa-model.co.jp

The Hasegawa Corporation (株式会社ハセガワ, Kabushiki Gaisha Hasegawa) is a Japanese company that manufactures plastic model kits of a variety of vehicles, including aircraft, cars, ships, military vehicles, model armor, model space craft, and science fiction kits.

Based in Shizuoka, Hasegawa competes against its neighbor, Tamiya, though it does not have as large a line of products.

Primarily using polystyrene, Hasegawa kits are typically regarded as very accurate, but without quite the ease-of-assembly that Tamiya kits offer, though of very high standard nonetheless. Currently, Hasegawa kits are imported into North America by Hobbico's Great Planes Model Distributor division. Hasegawa ended their long-time agreement with Dragon Models Limited for US distribution in early 2010. Hasegawa also imports Revell kits into Japan and sells them under both the Revell brand and its own brand label, and Revell frequently re-boxes Hasegawa kits for the European and North American markets.

Lacking their own lineup of paint products, Hasegawa kits come with instructions that specify the use of Gunze Sangyo products, most notably paints in the GSI Creos brand. This is in contrast to Tamiya, who specifies the use of its in-house brands.

Hasegawa is noted for releasing a large number of minor variations of their major products, often adding or modifying a small number of parts, or only changing the decals for the kit. This strategy allows them to maximize their return on their investment in kit tooling quicker, as such minor variations cost little to produce compared to the cost of manufacturing the original. Most such variations are usually only released once.

== History ==
In 1941, the Hasegawa factory opened as a manufacturer of wooden teaching materials, such as a woodwork models. It entered into the plastic model field in 1961, with its first plastic model "glider" airplane models. In the following June 1962, the "1/450 battleship Yamato" was released after high development costs and became a success with about 150,000 units sold in the same year, and continuing success in the following years. The profitable line of 1/90 F-104 Starfighter and 1/70 P-51 Mustang model kits became the turning point which prompted Hasegawa to turn away from woodwork models and to plastic models completely.
