= Italeri =

Italian manufacturer of scale models

Italeri S.p.A.
- Company type: Private
- Founded: 1962; 64 years ago
- Founder: Giuliano Malservisi; Gian Pietro Parmeggiani
- Headquarters: Bologna, Italy
- Products: Plastic scale models of airplanes, military vehicles, helicopters, ships, trucks, and cars
- Website: italeri.com

Italeri S.p.A. is an Italian manufacturer and brand of plastic scale models of airplanes, military vehicles, helicopters, ships, trucks, and cars. The company was founded in 1962 by Giuliano Malservisi and Gian Pietro Parmeggiani to produce accurate scale model kits with attention to detail.

== History ==
The company was founded in 1962 by Giuliano Malservisi and Gian Pietro Parmeggiani. Since childhood, they had loved airplanes and military vehicles, but were not satisfied enough with the scale models on the market available at those times. They began to produce models themselves, first as a hobby, and later turning it into a business.

The first name of the company was "Italstamp" and the first scale model kit was released with the brand "Aliplast", a 1:72 model of the Italian fighter Fiat G.55. The company name changed to "Italaerei" and, ten years later, it was contracted into "Italeri", easier to use and to pronounce not only in Italian language. The logo consists of an airplane silhouetted over a red and a green stripe.

The company, located close to Bologna, started to produce product lines characterized by a certain “uniqueness” on the subjects. In particular Italeri used to have a wide range of Italian subjects. During its lifetime Italeri has also acquired the Supermodel and Protar brands.

== Product lines ==
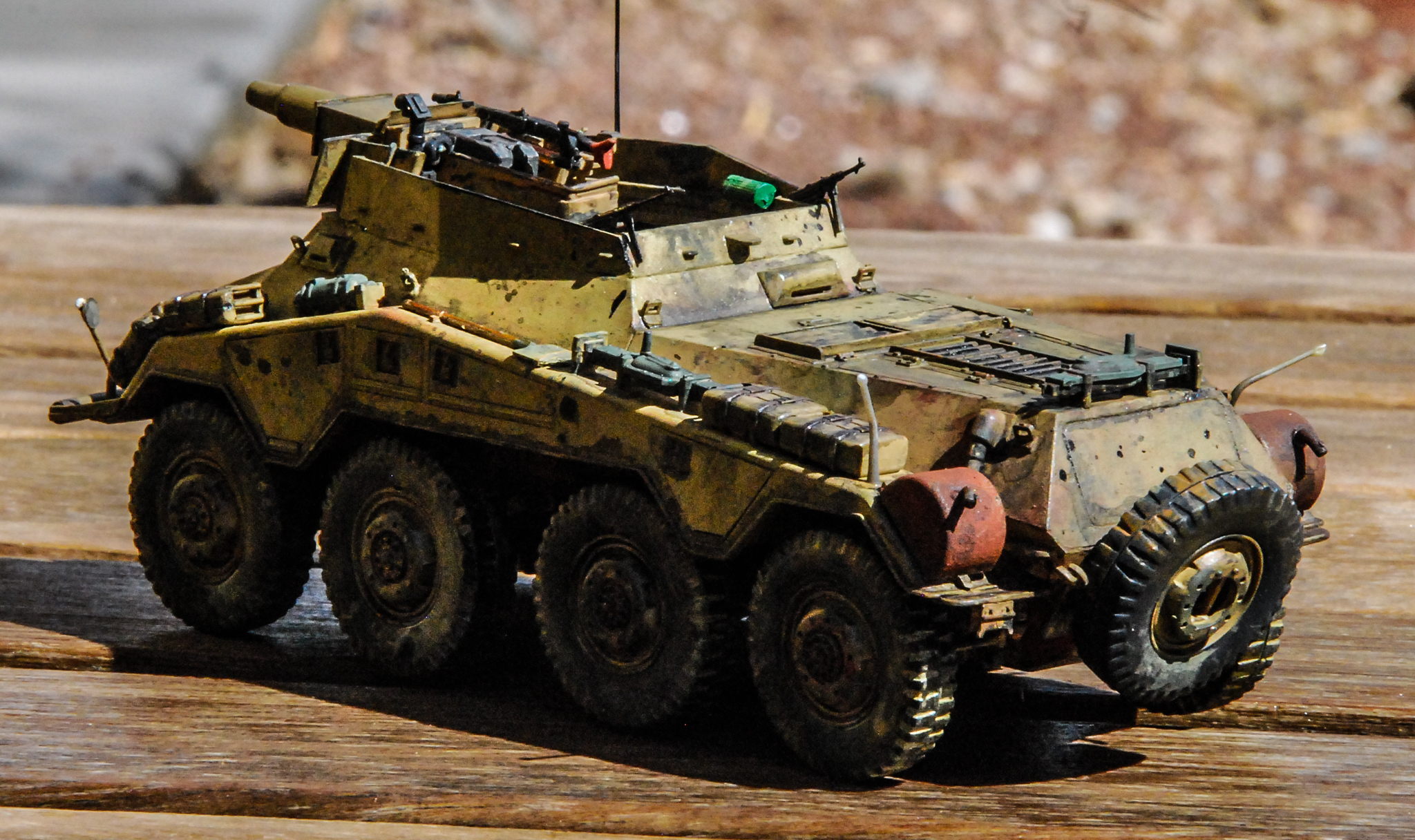
Italeri Sd.Kfz. 234 1:35 model

Italeri has a wide portfolio of scale models. It has designed famous Italian aircraft used by the Regia Aeronautica during the Second World War, from the small biplane fighter Fiat CR.42 Falco to Savoia-Marchetti SM.82 three-engine bomber. Italeri has also produced, in 1:72 scale, the Savoia-Marchetti SM.79, nicknamed "gobbo maledetto”, which translates as "the cursed hunchback".

Italeri also put great attention to WWII Italian Army military vehicles such as AB armored cars series, the small L6 recon tank, and the rare (produced in few numbers) P-40 heavy tank.

They have also produced a series of 1:35 scale motor torpedo boats of World War II such as the American PT-596, the metre-long model of the Schnellboot S-100 of the German Kriegsmarine, and the MAS of the Italian Regia Marina. The small assault boats 1:35 series also includes the Italian Barchino and Maiale and the German Biber.

Italeri also produces of 1:24 scale model trucks, trailers and semi-trailers.

In recent years, Italeri introduced the Photographic Reference Manual (PRM) for some kits, in which the subject of the scale model kit is described with a high level of historical information and modelling details. The first kit to be accompanied by the PRM was the U.S. Navy patrol torpedo boat.
