= Dragon Models Limited =

Hong-Kong plastic model manufacturer

- Type: Private
- Founded: 1987
- Headquarters: Hong Kong, China
- Products: Plastic models, diecast models, action figures

Dragon Models Limited (Dragon or DML for short) is a Hong-Kong–based manufacturer of plastic model kits, diecast models and military action figures. Founded in 1987, the company's products are distributed globally and can be found in most major hobby distribution channels and retailers. The company is headquartered in the Tsuen Wan district of Hong Kong, and operates a sales and distribution office in Shanghai China. They are known for their attention to historical accuracy and detail, and have worked with many renowned military experts for their product designs. Since its founding, it has released more than 1,000 items.

== History ==
Dragon was established in 1987, as a sister company to model retailer and distributor Universal Models Limited (UML), to design and manufacture their own plastic model kit products. In their early years, Dragon primarily focused on model kits featuring military vehicles topics, with their first ever item being the Typhoon-class submarine. The item became a hit due to the subject being heavily featured in the film The Hunt for Red October.

In the 1990s Dragon diversified into multiple different product lines including ready-made collectibles and action figures. These new products include a series of die-cast collectibles including 1/72 scale military vehicles Dragon Armor, 1/400 scale airliners Dragon Wings, and 1/72 scale military aircraft Dragon Wings: Warbirds. In 1999, Dragon introduced its 1/6 scale New Generation Life Action figure series, which featured life-like head sculpts and ultra-detailed uniforms, weapons, and gear. The series was met with acclaim and helped revive the action figure industry with collectors who view it as the successor of the more traditional and toy-like G.I. Joe products. This series features both historical and modern military soldier topics, as well as movie-licensed and pop-culture subjects. This series currently encompasses more than 600 releases.

== Product Lines ==
=== Plastic Model Kits ===
The original and most well-known product category in Dragon's catalogue are their series of scale model kits featuring military vehicles (1/35, 1/72, 1/144, and 1/6 scales), aircraft (1/32, 1/48, and 1/72 scales), warships (1/350 and 1/700 scales), figures (1/35, 1/9, and 1/16 scales) and spacecraft. The series mainly focuses on World War II-era military subjects, although they also offer a range of modern military topics such as the M1 Abrams. Their model kits are known for their accuracy and meticulous detail, as well as their sophisticated engineering and manufacturing techniques to accurately portray such details. Each kit is thoroughly researched by physically measuring the real-life vehicle (when available) and consulted by military experts that specialize in that particular vehicle. Dragon is also the originator of the terms Initial, Early, Mid, and Late Productions when describing the variation of World War II tanks, a term that is now widely adopted in the industry.

Dragon kits are also known for their box art, and they frequently collaborate with well known military-subject artists such as Canadian artist Ron Volstad and Japanese artists Masami Onishi, Yoshiyuki Takani, Shigeo Koike, and Ueda Shin.

Inside a box of Dragon Models kit usually contains the plastic parts to assemble the vehicle, as well as additional metal parts, photo-etch, instructions, and decals. Their kits usually contain many parts, and occasionally feature 3-in-1 or 2-in-1 items where the modeller can build 2 or 3 variants of the vehicle from one kit. Throughout the years, Dragon has developed multiple engineering technologies and features with the goal of enhancing the modeler's experience.

==== Magic Tracks and EZ tracks ====
'Magic Tracks' are individual track links that come in a bag, ready to be assembled without the tedious work of removing them individually from sprues. Magic Tracks are designed to snap together through a tight friction fit, so that the track can be more easily assembled than traditional model kit tracks. These can be effortlessly assembled by placing each individual track link together and then glued once the desired effect is achieved. This feature is designed to reduce the time spent on assembling the tracks by modelers.

==== One-Piece DS Tracks ====
A few of Dragon's newer kits, such as its Sherman M4A2 kit, include one-piece tracks made from 'Dragon Styrene 100' (DS), a plastic developed by Dragon's own Research and Development team. A cross breed of polystyrene and vinyl, DS is an attempt to combine the advantages of the two materials. Delicate details can be reproduced with DS using under-cut molding, reducing the number of small parts. The Tiger I hollow guide horns, for example, can be replicated on DS using slide-mold technology. These tracks can also be joined with normal plastic cement.

Some recent DS tracks seem to have an issue of being too long or too loose. The tracks may also come stretched due to packaging limitation, but the issue can be resolved by soaking the tracks in hot water.

==== Photo-etched Parts ====
Dragon almost always includes a small amount of photo-etched brass in its kits. Originally Dragon relied heavily on photo-etched parts to model engine deck screens, but it has since expanded its use of photo-etching to include optional parts like chains and fenders. Photo etched brass parts are used in kits to make small or delicate parts that are harder to make in scale from plastic, such as miniature eyeglasses, medals, seat belts, machine gun mounts, intake screens, etc.

In addition to photo-etched parts straight from the kit, Dragon also manufactures a small amount of separate photo-etched detail sets. It also has distribution agreement with Chinese model accessories company Lion Roar to sell and market Lion Roar's detail sets, which are available for kits from Dragon and other model companies.

==== Decals ====
Like its competitors, Dragon also includes decals in its kits. While Dragon sometimes prints its own decal sheets, it usually uses decals printed by Cartograf, an Italian decal maker.

==== Metal Parts ====
Turned aluminum barrels, metal tow cables, brass antenna and brass ammunition shells are common parts included in Dragon kits as an alternative to styrene parts. Small metal parts may also be included to accurately replicate a tank's wheels and lamp wiring. Some kits have as many as 48 metal parts.

==== Slide Molding ====
Although it is not a new technique, the use of slide molds allows more accurate reproduction of details than traditional two-piece molds. This is done by using injection molds with moving parts (known as "slides") that are inserted into the mold to form parts and then removed so the part can be extracted from the mold. It helps increase the authenticity of the model and reduce the number of parts by molding details onto larger parts. Weld patterns between plates, gratings, one-piece hull and turret interior are common features included in Dragon kits. The usage of slide mold technology has caused Dragon to rely less on photo-etched parts (See Smart Kit, below).

==== Smart Kits ====
According to Dragon, 'Smart Kits' are designed to be easier to build, without sacrificing the level of detail. Extra engineering has been invested in these kits, so that the construction of the models is more straightforward. Extensive use of slide molding techniques means crisply detailed parts are reproduced without the need of photo etched parts. Hence the kits can be built out of the box by most modelers using standard construction techniques. A 'Smart Kit' generally costs less than ordinary Dragon kits, because of the inclusion of fewer metal parts. However, Dragon emphasizes that the model has not in any way become simpler—only the assembly is less tedious.

Dragon has so far released thirty one Smart Kits, the first being a Panther G.

=== Dragon Wings (1/400 scale) ===
In 1997, Dragon started the Dragon Wings line of 1/400 scale aircraft, aiming not only at collectors but also airline companies who need display models. These models were sold fully finished. Over 100 commercial and national airline models have been released since then. Dragon was the officially appointed supplier of aircraft models for Airbus and Boeing for their promotional and souvenir purposes. In terms of commercial aviation, Dragon Wings was most active in the Early-Mid 2000s.

The 1/400 line of Dragon Wings also included a diecast space collection series. This collection includes models of the Space Shuttle, the Saturn V rocket of the Apollo program from NASA and many other launch vehicle such has the Delta II rocket. Other models like the International Space Station and the Russian space station Mir. Dragon Wings went defunct in 2014, due to increasing competition.

=== Military Figures (1/6 scale) ===
In 1999, Dragon introduced its New Generation Life Action Figure series. The series features fully posable military and licensed 12-inch figures with cloth uniforms, weapons and equipment. The series currently stands at some 400-plus individual releases, with subjects varying from World War II, Modern Special Operations and Law Enforcement, to licensed character figures from movies, sports, electronic games and comics. The equipment ranged up to paratroopers with aircraft walls, functioning parachutes and many vehicles. During the early 2000s, Dragon Models produced hundreds of action figures, most of them being World War II German figures. However, after 2010, the number of figures that it produced began to sharply decline. Dragon Models stopped producing 1/6 scale action figures in November 2012.

- Other action figure/model kit series:

Warrior Series (1/16) – Figures of tank crew and infantry
World's Elite Force Series (1/35)
'Nam' Series (1/35)
54mm Figures

=== Die-cast models (1/72 scale) ===
Dragon has released 'The Warbirds' line of mainly 1/72 scale die-cast fighter aircraft ranging from World War II classics to the modern day aircraft. In 2003 Dragon introduced another line of die-cast models – Dragon Armor – to complement with its Warbirds series of fighter aircraft. Dragon also markets a line of 1/144 models ('Panzer Korps') of German World War II and modern tanks.

== Facilities ==
Dragon has several large regional divisions. The most notable is in Shanghai, China, which produces its own exclusive lines of products. Recently, their China division relocated to Shenzhen. Its headquarters is located in Tsuen Wan, Hong Kong.

Previously, the company maintained a subsidiary in Industry, Southern California for marketing and distributing products for Dragon and other affiliated model companies in the US. This operation has been discontinued.

== John Adam hoax ==
In 2005 a militant group calling themselves the "Mujahedeen Brigades" posted a photograph depicting an American soldier named "John Adam" with his hands tied behind his back with a rifle pointed at him. His purported captors claimed that they would execute Adam if the United States did not comply with their demands, which called for the release of several Iraqi prisoners. Media sources questioned the photo's legitimacy and a military specialist for CNN commented that the image had several inaccuracies, one of which was the figure's uniform jacket. Soon after a spokesperson for Dragon noted that the man in the photo appeared to be the action figure "Special Ops Cody" and that the gun pointed at his head was an accessory that came with the toy. The toy had been manufactured exclusively for sale at AAFES in the Middle East. Sales of the figure rose after news of the toy's name spread.

== See also ==
- Model military vehicle
- Plastic model
