= Model military vehicle =

Scale model of military vehicle

Model military vehicles are miniature versions of military vehicles. They range in size and complexity; from simplified small-scale models for wargaming, to large, super-detailed renditions of specific real-life vehicles.

== Scales ==
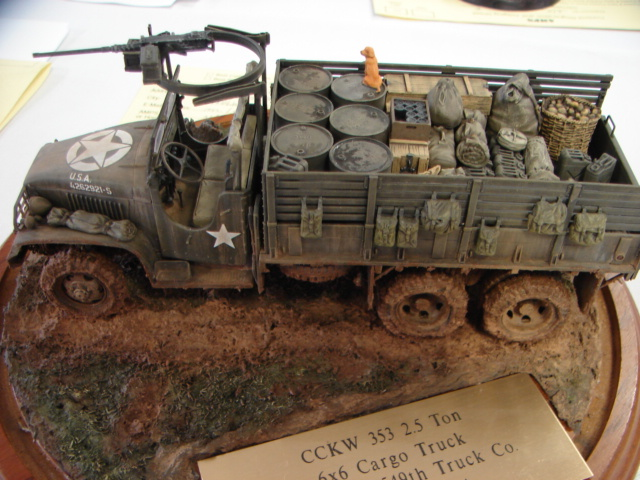
1:35 scale GMC truck model with a landscaped base

The 'scale' is the proportion of actual size the replica or model represents. Scale is usually expressed as a ratio (e.g. '1:35') or as a fraction (e.g. '1/35'). In either case it conveys the notion that the replica or model is accurately scaled in all visible proportions from a full-size prototype object. Thus a 1:35 scale model tank is 1/35 the size of the actual vehicle upon which the model is based. Models generally make no attempt to replicate scale weight, only size.

The most popular scales, by far, are 1:35 and 1:72. Other less-commonly used scales for commercially produced kits include: 1:1, 1:6, 1:9 ("Traditional" scale), 1:12, 1:16 (RC tanks, scale model kits), 1:24, 1:25, 1:30, 1:32, 1:48, 1:50, 1:64, 1:87 (railroad HO scale), 1:144, 1:250, 1:285, 1:300, and 1:350. A relatively recent trend led by Tamiya is military vehicle kits in 1:48 scale – a popular scale for military aircraft models. The scale was formerly introduced by companies such as Aurora, and Bandai in the 1970s. However, the scale did not gain popularity mostly because of the accuracy and detail of the scale. Scratchbuilt models may be in any scale but tend to follow the most popular kit scales due to the ease of finding kit components which may be used in the scratchbuilt model.

Larger-scale models tend to incorporate higher levels of detail, but even smaller-scale models may be quite intricate.

== Subjects ==
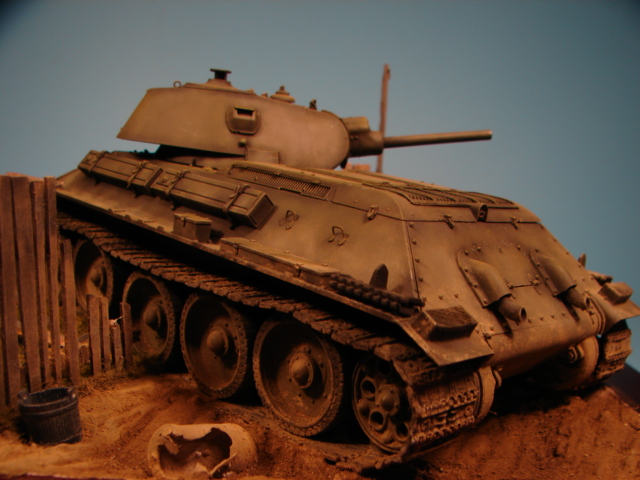
A 1:35th scale Soviet T-34 tank from World War II.

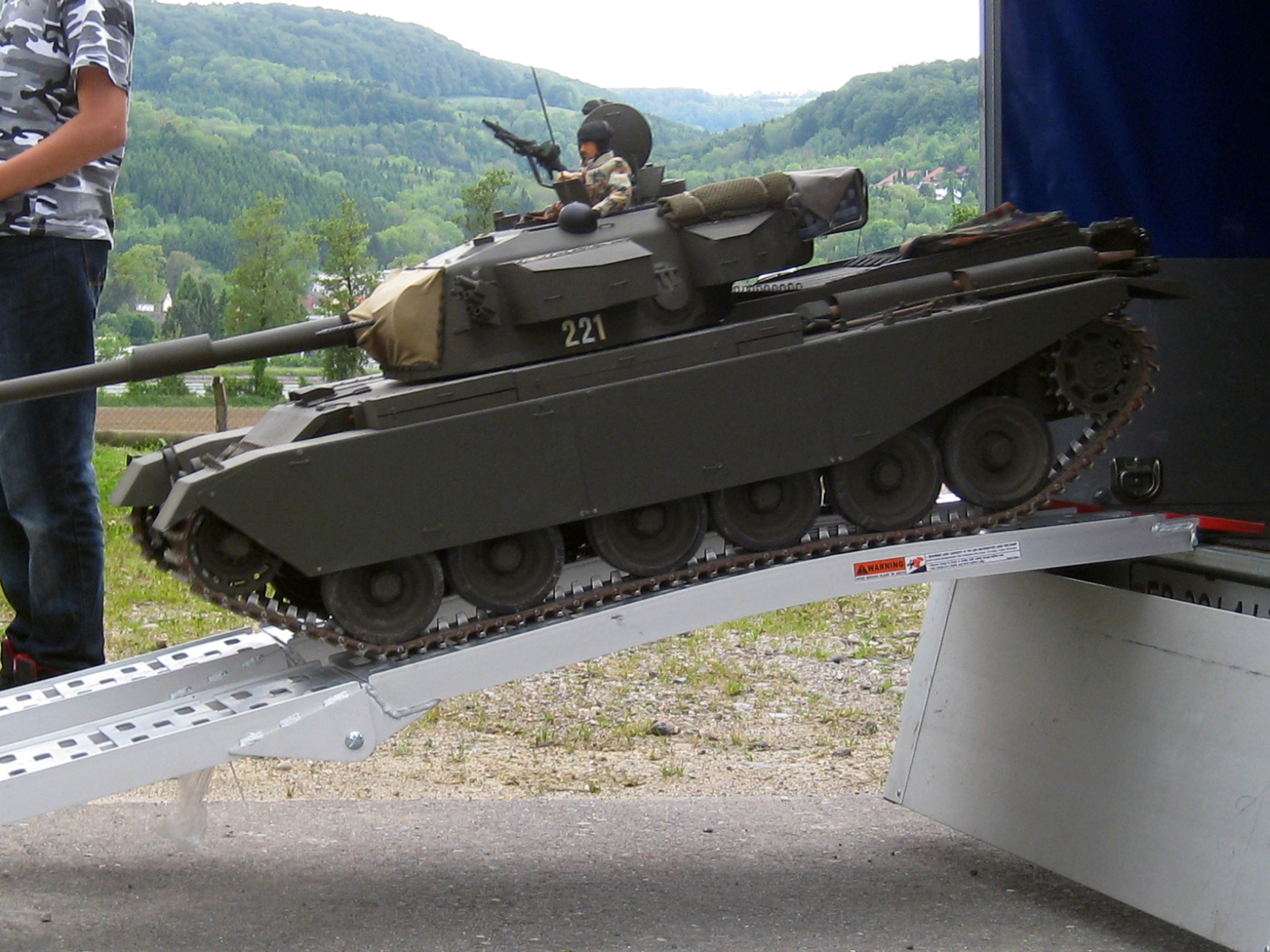
Remote controlled model of Centurion tank

Military vehicle modelers build a wide variety of models. Tanks and other armored fighting vehicles are the most popular subjects at model contests. Modelers also build ordnance, military trucks, tractors, half-tracks, artillery, and lighter vehicles such as jeeps and motorcycles. Models may be displayed in stand-alone mode, that is, with no base, or on a decorative base, often with a label of some kind. More elaborate bases may include scale scenery, intended to depict the setting in which the vehicle served. This trends towards the closely related hobby of diorama building.

Modelers tend to focus on vehicles from three eras: World War I, World War II, and the modern era. The first denotes armored vehicles from their inception into combat during the first World War until approximately 1939. Many vehicles of this time period may be considered to be experimental and few made major contributions to the few battles in which they took part.

Models depicting vehicles from the World War I era and the following interwar years are not as numerous as their later world war counterparts, but this is beginning to change in recent years. As of the centenary of the start of World War I, more manufacturers have begun to release kits World War I and interwar subjects: Takom releasing a range of British tanks such as the Mark I and Whippet; Meng providing two variants of the FT-17 and the German A7V and Hobbyboss releasing an interwar Vickers Medium Mark II are all examples of this.

Vehicles used between 1939 and 1945 fall into the World War II category. Even though this era spans the shortest number of years, it is by far the most popular for armor modelers due to the enormous range of vehicles used and the vast improvements in armor technology. During the early part of the war, most armored vehicles were smaller, less heavily armored, and lightly armed. Major tank engagements early on convinced governments on all sides of the need for more survivable and deadlier vehicles. This means that there is a large variety of different subjects which were designed to fulfil different roles under different doctrines.

Any vehicle serving in a setting after 1945 is considered "modern." This encompasses a longer time span and very large number of armor designs from many countries.

Models may also be categorized by place of service, for example, US or Soviet. They may also be categorized by function, for example, combat engineering vehicles, recovery vehicles, etc. In all cases, the national and unit markings on the replica determine the era and user nationality. For example, a model of a Sherman tank, a World War II design, would be considered a 'modern' model if the tank were shown in Israeli markings from the Six-Day War. The same vehicle in World War II US Army markings would be considered a World War II Allied subject.

Models are generally built with historical accuracy in mind, and each model may represent many hours of research effort on the part of the modeler. Frequently, modelers display some of their research work alongside their model.

There is generally some crossover of modelers between the eras, though some focus solely on a specific era, country of origin or operation, or even on a specific vehicle and its variants.

== Models and model kits ==
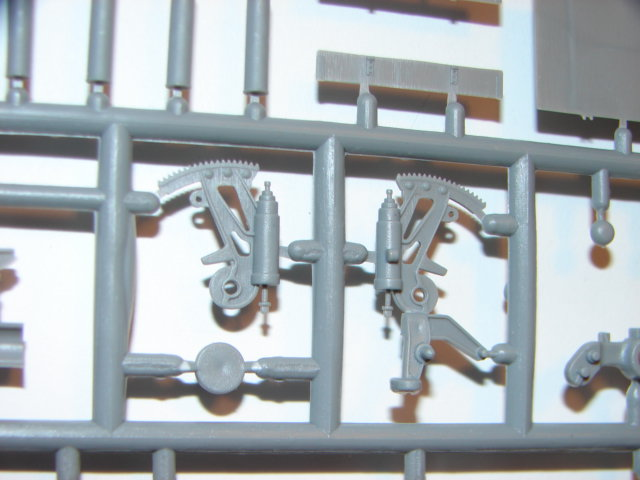
The plastic 'sprue' holds the components of a 1:35 scale ZIS-2 antitank gun kit.

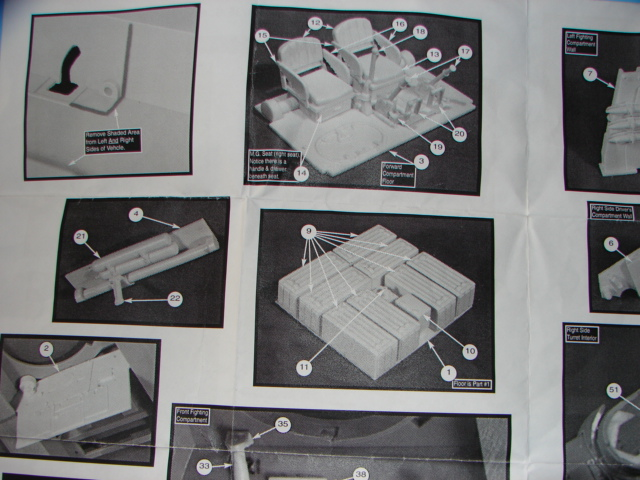
Instructions for the assembly of a 1:35 scale T-34 tank interior set.

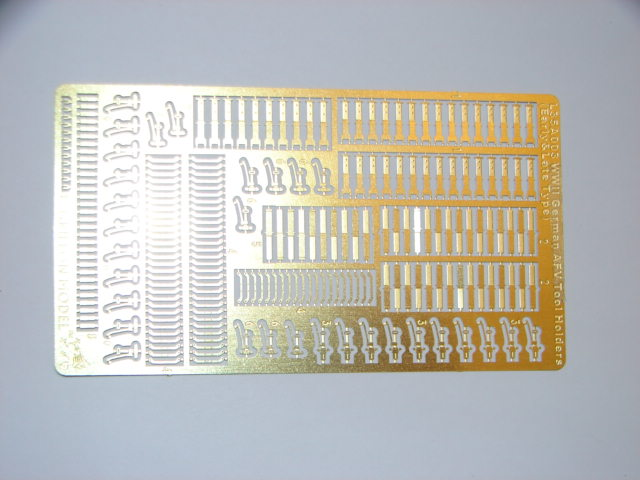
Photoetched metal parts, still on their carrier frame, for a 1:35 scale German tank model.

Dry-transfer markings for a 1:35 scale Stuart tank model in French service.

=== Kits ===
Models are usually assembled from commercial kits (for exceptions see below). Typically, a model kit consists of a set of parts, instructions for their assembly, and a small sheet of markings in decal form.

Parts are produced by injection of liquid styrene plastic under very high pressure into complex steel molds. These molds are generally composed of two-halves that sandwich the parts; however, 'slide molds' may consist of many steel components to allow greater levels of detail to be incorporated into a single sprue. Once the plastic cools, it is removed from the mold. In the 1960s and 1970s, typical vehicle kits might contain 50 to 200 individual parts. Today it is common for a single vehicle kit to contain from 300 to 1200 parts. Each part must be carefully cut from the 'sprue' (the plastic channels that allow the plastic to flow into the mold and which hold the parts in place), cleaned of any flaws or mold marks, and then assembled.

Instructions consist of paper booklets or sheets supplied with each kit. Usually, instructions show drawings of the parts. A recent trend has been the use of photographs rather than drawings, but these types of instructions have not proven popular and may be declining in use. For a kit with hundreds of parts, good instructions are vital. Flaws in instructions are not uncommon.

Markings for the model usually are provided as decals.

Several companies produce armor model kits, the most famous of which are Airfix, Dragon Models Limited, Tamiya, Trumpeter, Academy, Hobby Fan, Italeri, Revell-Germany/Monogram and AFV Club. The focus of many manufacturers of late has been to increase the accuracy of their kits and provide alternative types of material such as photo etch details and turned metal barrels.

=== Models ===
Completed models can be categorized generally into three classes: kits built 'out of the box', customized kits, and scratchbuilt models.

==== "Out of the box" models ====
Models built 'out of the box' are built according to kit instructions, using no materials except those provided in the kit itself. In the past, there was some tendency to view 'out of the box' builds as simpler or of a lower standard of detail than modified kits (see below). However, recent trends in which kits contain over 1,000 individual pieces including parts from plastic, etched brass, and aluminum have given new meaning to the 'out of the box' build. Today, a stock kit can be very highly detailed.

==== Customized models ====
Customized kits are typically built by more experienced modelers who take a kit and add components, either scratchbuilt or commercial conversion or aftermarket accessories. Such models may be more highly detailed than a straight build 'out of the box' though the trend to more detailed kits is decreasing the difference. The term 'kitbashing' denotes models built using parts from more than one kit to make a single, more accurate or different model. Many armor modelers engage in the use of aftermarket sets and built from scratch (scratchbuilt) parts to make their models more accurate or simply unique. In extreme, master-level cases, a model with hundreds of kit components may be detailed with several hundred additional commercial and home-fabricated parts to reach a very high level of realism.

==== Scratchbuilt models ====
Scratchbuilt models are those for which no kit exists; highly skilled modelers create their vehicle from sheet plastic and components they fabricate themselves. Some scratchbuilt models may contain a few commercial components, but typically it is a small proportion of all the model's parts.

Scratchbuilt models may also be made from brass and aluminum, cast in pewter (a low temp metal) and cast with 2-part resins in molds made of RTV rubber material. A scratchbuilding modeler should possess talents in the following areas: soldering, gluing, drilling, taping, grinding, sanding, cutting & shaping in metals and plastics, creating RTV molds (1,2 & 3 part types), painting & weathering, research of prototype material, casting in low temp metals, creating sketches and diagrams of what is being made, measuring in inches or millimeters, use of calipers and other specialized tools.

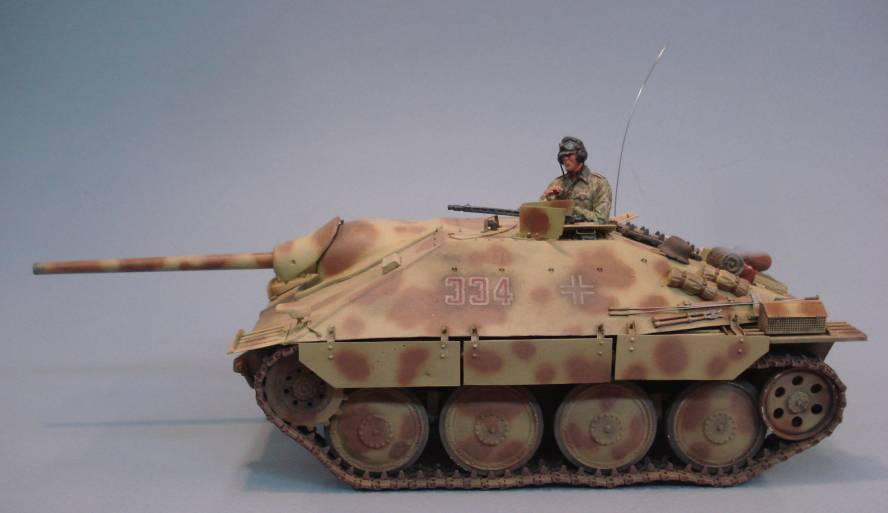
Scratchbuilt Hetzer tank destroyer in 1:16th scale

=== Aftermarket ===
"Aftermarket" denotes any kit or detail set that is sold to replace existing kit parts in order to reproduce a more accurate model or simply a different version not otherwise available. The media used by aftermarket companies range from turned aluminum and brass, photo-etched steel or brass sheets, pre-bent brass wire, cast metals, and resin. Notable aftermarket companies include Formations, The Tank Workshop, Tank, Azimut, Eduard, Verlinden, Friulmodel, Legend, and Modelkasten.

Aftermarket markings are also available. Firms such as Archer Dry Transfers or Decalomaniacs produce stand-alone sheets of wet or dry transfer markings to allow the modeler to complete a different or more accurate variant.

Enthusiasts may pursue military vehicle modeling in its own right or as an adjunct to other military modeling. There is also some crossover with wargaming, diorama building, and re-enacting.

== Displays ==
Models may be displayed on their own, on a base or as part of a diorama.

Many models are displayed with no base or other setting. Their wheels or track rest upon the shelf or table on which they are displayed. This display method is the easiest and cheapest, but has the disadvantage that the fragile model may be damaged when handled.

A simple wooden base adds an element of protection to the model because the model itself does not need to be handled, it can be moved by handling the base. Bases may also hold a plate with some information about the model, such as its title or designation, or some historical background. This kind of bases typically consist of a frame of wood or other material. Finishes on bases range from painted plastic to stained wood to simple landscaping. The disadvantage is that the base adds expense and time to the project.

A diorama is a more elaborate base with landscaping to provide a setting for the model, and often includes a story with figures. Dioramas have the same advantages and disadvantages of plain bases, but to a greater degree.

Models are often displayed in competition such as the AMPS annual show, or in club displays at hobby shops and other events.

== Organizations and publications ==
Several organizations and publications exist to support and promote the hobby of modeling military vehicles. The Armor Modeling and Preservation Society or AMPS is an 800-plus member organization devoted to the hobby. The International Plastic Modellers' Society (or IPMS) supports modelers of all types including military vehicle modelers. The Miniature Armoured Fighting Vehicle Association (MAFVA, http://www.mafva.org/) is a UK-based association.

Commercial publications devoted to or including military vehicle modeling include AFVModeller, Military Miniatures in Review (MMiR), Armour Modelling, and Military Modelling.
