= Naval wargaming =

Tabletop games with a naval theme

Naval wargaming is a branch of the wider hobby of miniature wargaming. Generally less popular than wargames set on land, naval wargaming nevertheless enjoys a degree of support around the world. Both historical and fantasy rulesets are available.

Model ships have long been used for wargaming, but it was the introduction of elaborate rules in the early 20th century that made the hobby more popular. Small miniature ships, often in 1:1200 scale and 1:1250 scale, were manoeuvred on large playing surfaces to recreate historical battles. These models were basic representations of ship types, with enough detail to make them recognisable. Firms such as Bassett-Lowke marketed these to the public in England, along with more detailed versions that appealed to collectors. Prior to World War II, the German company Wiking became a leader in the field, but the war ended its dominance.

After World War II, several manufacturers started business in Germany, which remains a major centre of production to this day. Other companies started in Britain and the United States as well, first centering on the wargamer, but as time went by and models became both more detailed and costly, marketing to the collector. There has also been a diversification in scales. Plastic kits in 1/600 and 1/700 became widely available. In the UK Skytrex and Navwar pioneered the "micro scale" with extensive ranges of ships from pre-dreadnought ironclads to modern vessels in 1/3000. In the US CinC and GHQ followed with slightly larger and more detailed models in 1/2400. In recent years Hallmark have moved the scale down to 1/6000.

A separate branch of naval wargaming uses radio control ships capable of firing BB ammo from CO_{2} powered cannons, with the aim of sinking opposing ships, whose hulls are made of thin balsa wood.

== Overview ==
=== Rules ===
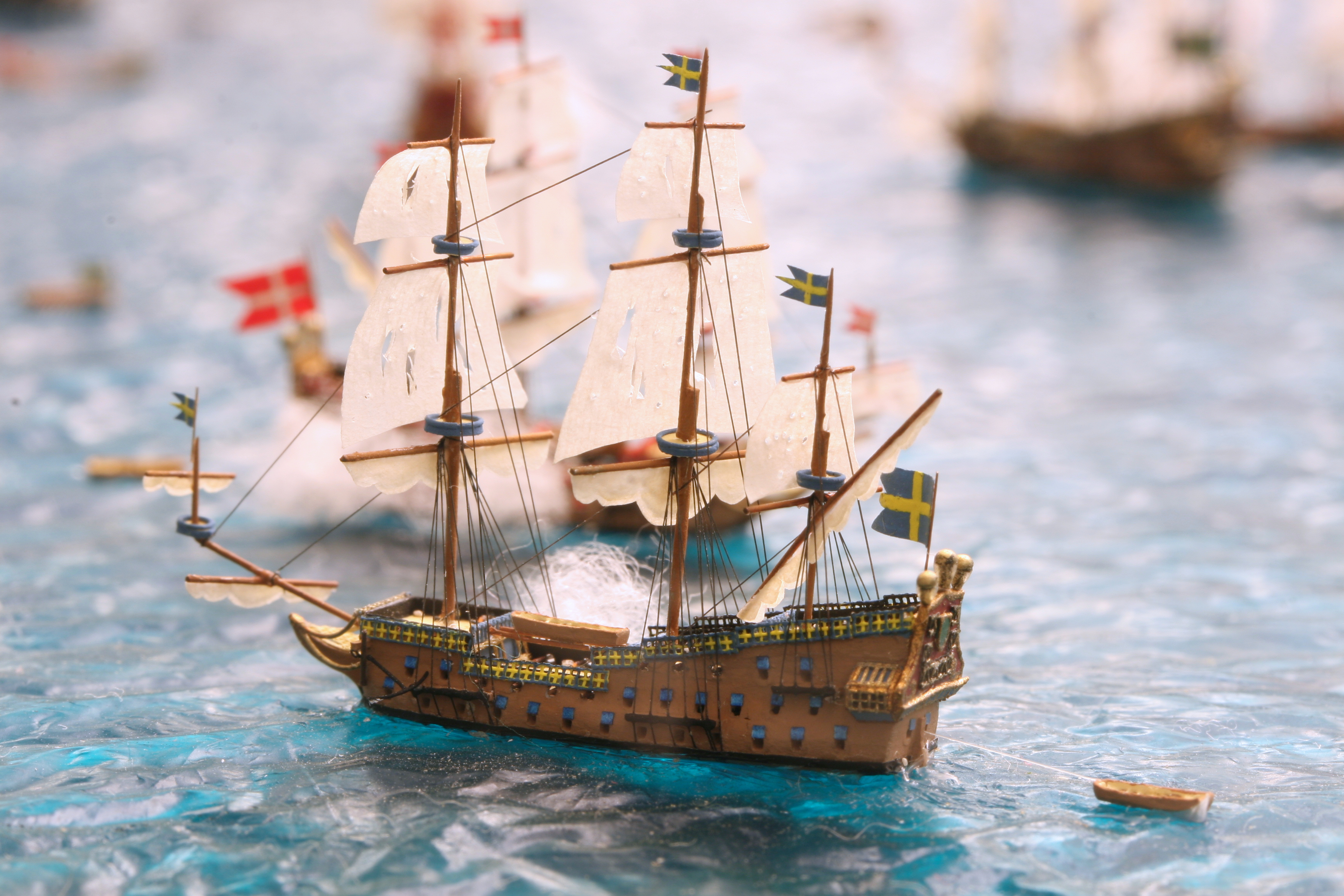
The origins of naval-themed board wargaming have obvious connections with the art of making model ships

As with other arms of the wargaming hobby, rules can vary greatly in complexity. Commercially available historical rulesets cover practically every era of naval warfare from ancient and medieval ships through the fleets of the Age of Sail, the ironclad and battleship eras to the modern era. Models of most common types of ships are available, but in many cases wargamers have to source their own models, either by conversion or scratch building, especially where more esoteric periods or scales are in use.

The ancient Romans staged what were probably the first naval "wargames", with mock sea battles acted out in Rome's Colosseum, specially flooded for the occasion. (These Naumachiae later provided the inspiration for the title of Rod Langton's ancient naval rules.)

Popular naval wargaming began with the inclusion of wargaming rules in early editions of Jane's Fighting Ships by Fred T. Jane. Classifications of ships' armour and armament in Janes' were used directly within the rules. Incarnations of the rules are still in use today.

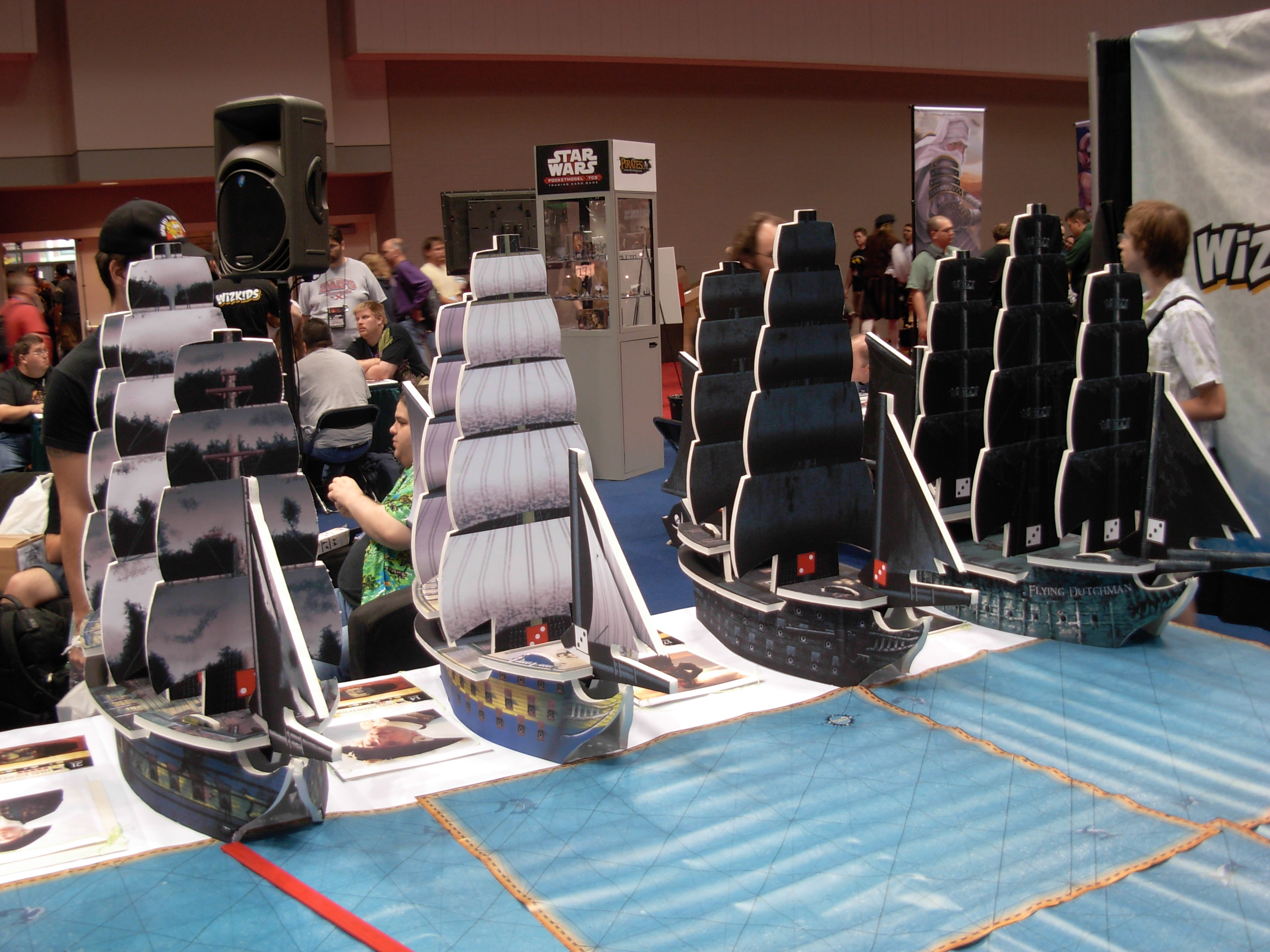
Oversized model pirate ships for the Pirates Constructible Strategy Game, at Gen Con Indy in August 2007

A later proponent of popular naval wargaming was American author Fletcher Pratt. As well as publishing his rules Pratt staged large public games in ballrooms and other large meeting rooms, the events being almost as much a social event as a wargaming meeting. As with Janes' rules various incarnations and revisions of the Fletcher Pratt rule system are still in use today.

The Age of Sail rules for the 1972 Don't Give Up The Ship call for pencil and paper, six-sided dice, rulers and protractors, and model ships, ideally of 1:1200 scale. Single ship engagements can be played on a tabletop, but fleet battles require more space. The rules are elaborate and cover morale, sinking, fires, broken masts, and boarding. Wind speed and direction are determined by a roll of the dice; a protractor is used to measure the angle between the wind and ship directions and hence determine ship speed. The protractor is also used to determine which cannon can fire on an enemy ship, as well as the damage caused and the chance of hitting at short range (4") and long range (16"). The conclusion of the rulebook provides the statistics necessary to re-enact historical encounters such as during the War of 1812. The second edition added 4 pages of simplified rules for battles between fleets.

One of the most popular sets of rules available at present is General Quarters, written by Lonnie Gill. Quick and easy to play, they have established themselves over the years as one of the leading sets of World War I and II era rules. General Quarters 1 and 2 feature a slightly abstract combat system and ship definition system reminiscent of naval board wargames. However, this approach led to a fast-playing system that was the root of its popularity (probably coupled to an extensive array of supporting information and ship statistics). GQ1 and 2 have recently been replaced by a less abstract version, GQ3 which covers World War II; a World War I version entitled Fleet Action Imminent was released in January 2008.

The 1975 naval wargame Don't Give Up The Ship.

Followers of naval wargaming tend to concentrate on historical settings. However, there is a smaller but nonetheless active arm of the hobby that covers fantasy and science fiction naval warfare. The now out-of-print fantasy game Man O' War, set in the realm of Warhammer Fantasy, dealt with sea battles where each player typically controlled half a dozen to a dozen model ships. Each model had a corresponding template to record damage, crew levels, and outbreaks of fire, among other bookkeeping activities. In this regard, the game mechanics proved some limiting factors. Ships were split into three categories: Ships of the Line, Men O'War and "Independents". The Bretonnian fleet was modelled on ships of the 17th century, while the Empire tended more towards the look of earlier time, with some ships that carried single large cannon or mortars. Dwarf ships were steam powered ironclads, and they also had submarines and balloons. High Elf ships were fast maneuverable sail powered ships, while Dark Elves mainly used great sea creatures as the basis for their "ships".

Land-based miniature wargames have also been adapted to naval wargaming. All at Sea, for example, is an adaptation of The Lord of the Rings Strategy Battle Game rules for naval conflicts. The game's mechanics centred on boarding parties, with options for ramming actions and light artillery in the form of ballistae and other siege engines. As such, the ship's scale ratio corresponds to the 25 mm scale miniatures used by The Lord of the Rings. Model ships are built by hobbyists, just as normal miniature terrain, such as "great ships" of Pelargir, cogs of Dol Amroth and Corsairs of Umbar galleys. Elsewhere successful adaptations of the DBA and Fire and Fury land warfare rules have been made to ancient and Renaissance naval battles at the fleet action level (where naval battles shared many characteristics of their land based equivalents).

An unusual source of recent historical naval wargaming rules has been the adaptation of science fiction starship combat rules (the reverse is also true, as sci-fi tends to treat starships as being an evolution of "wet navy" shipping). An example of this approach to rule development is Victory at Sea from Mongoose Publishing. This is a simple, "entry level" set of rules developed from Mongoose's A Call to Arms sci-fi rules. Victory at Sea has also spawned a number of period variants including Ironclad and Age of Sail, and a World War I variant set called "Age of dreadnoughts" has also been published. Elsewhere a variant of the Full Thrust science fiction starship combat rules exists that covers age of sail battles. Another example, Battlefleet Gothic (BFG), is based from the Warhammer 40,000 land battle game, both developed by Games Workshop. Every major army in Warhammer 40,000 has its representative fleet in BFG, as it is known colloquially.

Classic space navy battle games such as Star Trek: Starship Tactical Combat Simulator corporation or Star Wars: Star Warriors have been heavily influenced by naval terminology.

=== Scales ===
In contrast to land wargaming, naval wargaming almost exclusively uses ratios to express the scale of the models. Popular scales include:

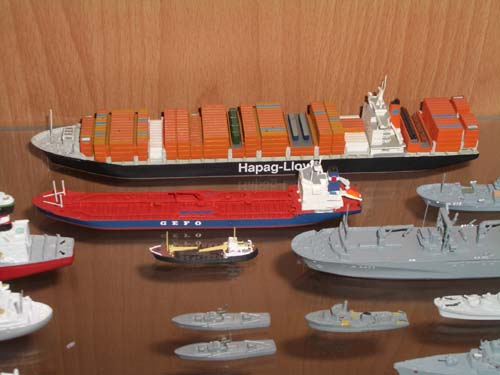
1:1250 scale die-cast models of ships

- 1:6000, 1:4800, 1:3000, 1:2400 - popular for use in games of the pre-Dreadnought era and later, although some notable ranges in earlier periods are available.
- 1:1800 - A growing intermediate scale, made popular by games such as Axis and Allies: War at Sea that use a "trading card" format. While still less common than smaller and larger scales, the simpler dynamics of "casual" wargaming makes this an increasingly common introductory scale.
- 1:1200, 1:1250 - the popular "collectors'" scale, with models from practically every era and nationality available.
- 1:900 - an unusual scale, used for ancient naval games.
- 1:600, 1:700 - generally used for coastal forces gaming set in World War I, World War II or post war periods. Due to the availability of plastic kits in this scale, some naval wargamers use these scales to play "in the grand manner" for battleship encounters, often playing on areas measured in yards rather than feet. This is also an extremely popular scale for American Civil War riverine and other ironclad era actions.
- 1:450 - another unusual scale, used for pirate and small Age of Sail actions (e.g. Peter Pig's "Pieces of Eight" range).
- 1:400, 1:300, 1:285 - some coastal models are available in these scales. Often used for riverine actions involving close liaison with land forces in similar scales.
- 10mm or 1:160 - a newer scale for "collectible" American Civil War naval gaming. Often used for actions involving close liaison with land forces in 10 mm.

Notable exceptions to the "ratio" rule are the use of 15 mm to 25 mm games that emphasise boarding actions, and thus make use of figure ranges in those scales.

== Radio control combat ==
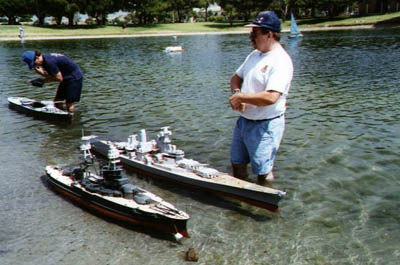
Large scale model warships in San Diego

Rather than simply acting out battles through the use of representative static models, in model warship combat, radio control ships (usually used in ponds) are constructed and outfitted with BB cannons capable of damaging and sinking other vessels. The ships are designed to be realistically sunk, and all clubs have very stringent rules requiring ships not to be built with hulls stronger than is appropriate, typically specifying a thickness of the balsa wood hulls as well as a test of penetrability. To reduce the chance of spectator injuries, and to prevent a vessel from having an unfair advantage, the propellant gas used in the cannons is limited in pressure, and may be tested by the judges, again disqualifying a ship if it is too high.

For historic copies any ship traveling faster than the appropriate scale speed may be disqualified or ordered to maintain a slower speed. An inappropriately high top speed gives a ship an unfair advantage, and is frowned upon by other members. 1/144 scale is the most common scale, although others do exist.

Some events try to recreate historic events, while others create original scenarios, such as all-out war, a subset of ships defending a port against an attacking enemy, protection of a group of unarmed merchant vessels, or any other scenario the club members decide would be fun. Even in recreations of historic battles, the sequence of events and outcome of the engagements are decided by the actions and luck of the operators, and often do not have much resemblance of the historical events.

Depending on the rules, a ship may be allowed to surrender and receive safe passage back to shore where it is removed from play, or other ships may fire on it until it sinks. Ships are designed to tolerate sinking such that a sunken ship need only be retrieved after the battle is over, minor repairs executed, fresh batteries installed, and returned to the water for the next round. Many ships also contain bilge pumps, of a maximum capacity specified by the rules of a specific club for the type of ship, to allow them to sustain minor damage without immediately sinking.

In some formats, events are scored by the final results, such as which side has more remaining ships (or survives longest) in a two team game, while others are scored on a point systems, with hits and sinkings assigned differing point values.

== See also ==
- List of miniature wargames
