= Victory at Sea (disambiguation) =

Victory at Sea is an American documentary television series.

Victory at Sea may also refer to:

- Victory at Sea (band), a music band
- Victory at Sea (game), a naval wargame
- Victory at Sea Memorial, a memorial
