= All at Sea (ruleset) =

All at Sea is a naval ruleset for Games Workshop's miniature wargame The Lord of the Rings Strategy Battle Game. The official rules were a modified version of the Warhammer Boat rules, adapted by Nick Davis and first presented in Games Workshop's White Dwarf magazine (US issue 295).

The game's mechanics centre on boarding parties, with options for ramming actions and light artillery in the form of ballistae and other siege engines. As such, the game's scale ratio corresponds to the 25mm scale miniatures used by The Lord of the Rings Strategy Battle Game. Games Workshop has not yet released any model ships for this system, opting instead to provide terrain guides for model shipbuilding, but Corsair miniatures were released in 2008. Model ships are built by hobbyists, just as normal miniature terrain, such as "great ships" of Pelargir, cogs of Dol Amroth and Corsairs of Umbar galleys.

== See also ==
- Man O'War
- Battlefleet Gothic
