= General Quarters (rules) =

General Quarters is a set of naval wargaming rules written by Lonnie Gill that were first published in the 1970s. Being quick and easy to play, they have become one of the most popular series of World War I and World War II era naval rules (the rules topped a poll of popular wargame rules among members of the Naval Wargames Society).

== Gameplay ==
There are currently three versions available:

- GQ1 covered World War II and used a d6 based system.

- GQ2 expanded coverage to World War I whilst also introducing new rules for World War II games; it also introduced a revised combat system that used a d10 in addition to d6.

- GQ3 was a complete revision published in 2006. A revised World War I version was published as Fleet Action Imminent in September 2007.

There are a number of campaign supplements for GQ3. The first is The Solomons Campaign about the World War II Guadalcanal battles. The next is Sudden Storm, a hypothetical campaign dealing with a war between Japan and the United States in 1937, a surprisingly possible occurrence, and one that yields a lot of big gun battles as the United States fights its way back across the Pacific to the Philippines.

== Reception ==
General Quarters won the H.G. Wells award for All Time Best 20th Century Naval Rules of 1979.

== Review ==
- Panzerfaust and Campaign Article Index: Number 72 Mar-Apr 1976 - The Blue-Light Manual: Wargame Rules for the American Civil War / General Quarters / Don't Give Up the Ship - "Miniature Warfare: Reviews of New Products" (Review), Don Lowry
