= Victory at Sea (game) =

Wargame rules for WWII naval miniatures

Cover of original hardcover book, 2006

Victory at Sea, subtitled "World War II Naval Combat Game", is a set of World War II naval wargaming rules published by Mongoose Publishing in 2006.

== Description ==
Victory at Sea is a hardback book that contains a set of wargame rules used to simulate naval combat during World War II using 1/1800 scale.

The rules, both basic and advanced, take up about 20% of the 206-page book. Other sections contain scenarios, longer campaigns, lists of ships, and illustrations of ship counters. The latter can be photocopied and cut out for use in the game, or players can use 1/1800 plastic ship miniatures from popular wargames like Axis & Allies.

In addition to the book and ship counters, the game requires a 4 ft × 6 ft (1.2 m × 1.8 m) playing surface, a tape measure or ruler, and several six-sided dice.

== Scenarios ==
Victory at Sea contains a number of historical scenarios such as the Battle of Denmark Strait. These scenarios contain a list of the ships present during the combat as well as opening positions and fleet objectives.

=== Designing a scenario ===
Players can also choose to design their own scenario. First the players choose a Priority Level for the scenario: War, Battle, Raid, Skirmish, or Patrol. Each player is then given a certain number of Fleet Allocation Points with which to purchase ships. Ships rated below the chosen Priority Level cost less, while ships rated above the Priority Level cost more.

Once the fleets have been chosen, the type of scenario defines the beginning positions of the fleets, as well as the fleet objectives.

For example, if the players choose a Convoy Duty scenario, the convoy player must deploy their ships 48 inches from a short edge of the playing surface and at least 18 inches from either long edge. The convoy's objective is to safely traverse the 48 inches to the edge of the playing surface, while the attacker's objective is to eliminate the convoy.

== Gameplay: Basic rules ==
Each turn is divided into four phases: Initiative, Movement, Attack, and End.

=== Initiative ===
Each player rolls two dice. The player with the highest score has the choice of moving first or letting the other player move first.

=== Movement ===
Each ship is rated for movement in terms of inches per turn. For example, a battleship might have a movement of 6 inches per turn. Each ship can move up to its maximum rate, but must move at least one inch each turn, unless combat damage has left it dead in the water, or if the ship is undertaking a special action such as Create Smoke, or Rig for Silent Running.

Each ship also has a turn rating, and can make one change of direction during each game turn. Once a ship has moved half its rated movement, a turn template is placed on the ship, and the ship can change direction as marked on the template. For example, a battleship might have a turn rating of "1", meaning it can turn as far as the "1" mark on the turn template. Once a ship has turned, it continues on its new course for the remainder of its movement.

=== Attack ===
Once both players have completed all movement desired, the first player can attack an enemy ship by declaring the ship that will fire, and the target chosen. To simulate the split-second decisions made during actual naval combat, the attacking player may not pre-measure the range, or determine if the defending ship is within the firing arc of a particular gun.

Once the declaration has been made, the attacking player then determines if the ship is within range and if the ship is within the firing arc of the chosen gun. If the answer is yes to both, then the attacker rolls attack dice according to the gun's attack rating. If all the attack dice have a score equal to or greater than the target's Target Rating, then the attacker rolls the pertinent gun's damage dice and compares the result to the target's armour rating.

For example, if a battleship were firing a gun with an attack dice rating of 2 and a damage rating of 3 at a cruiser with a target rating of 4 and an armour rating of 6, then the attacker would need to roll 4 or better on both attack dice to score a hit. If the attacker succeeded in scoring a hit, the attacker would then roll 3 damage dice. If the total of the dice was more than 6, then a point of damage is deducted from the target ship.

If any of the damage dice is a 6, this may result in a critical hit. The attacker rerolls the die and if it is a 4 or better, then the attacker rolls on a critical hit table, which will may result in fires, loss of crew, loss of speed, or damage to weapons.

After a certain amount of damage, the target ship is crippled, resulting in reductions in speed, turning capability and weapons. Crew loss will result in lessened performance in repair capability, maneuverability and combat capability.

=== End phase ===
During the End phase, players may attempt to extinguish fires and repair damage caused by critical hits. Failure to accomplish these may result in crew loss.

== Advanced rules ==
The Advanced rules cover additional concerns such as aircraft, weather, night battles, radar and submersibles.

== Publication history ==
In 2004, the UK game company Mongoose Publishing based in Swindon released A Call to Arms, a tabletop miniatures spacefleet wargame designed by Matthew Sprange that was set in the Babylon 5 universe. It proved to be very popular, and Sprange adapted the rules for World War II naval combat. The result was the 206-page hardcover book Victory at Sea, published in 2006.

The following year, Mongoose released the supplement Order at Sea designed by Richard L. Bax, Wulf Corbett, David Manley, Agis Neugebauer, and Erik Nicely that included new rules, new classes of ships and expanded ship lists.

In 2009, Mongoose released Victory at Sea: Age of Dreadnoughts designed by David Manley revised the rules and ship lists for naval combat during World War I.

In 2013, iEvilgames, the gaming subsidiary of Evil Twin Artworks, created a videogame for iOS, Android, PC and Mac based on the Victory at Sea rules.

In 2020, Warlord Games published a revised edition of the rules designed by Matthew Sprange titled Victory at Sea: Battle for the Pacific. It was released as a boxed set that also included fifteen 1/1800 scale ships.

== Reception ==
Brandon Neff, writing for Armchair General, commented, "This is a light, fast game. In an hour or so, you can recreate a naval battle without being bogged down by overly complicated and seemingly pedantic rules. This game can be taught in a few minutes and there is very little downtime for either player." Neff's only complaint was the minor role played by aircraft. Neff concluded by warning that "This is a beer and pretzels game and the serious grognard may be dismayed if expecting something different."

Stuart Fieldhouse was ambivalent about Victory at Sea, finding that "it is NOT good for fighting convoy actions, and the rules for sub-hunting are sparse and inadequate". Fieldhouse also found that "Airpower in the game is understrength, to say the least" and commented that record-keeping might be a concern for some players, saying, "There is also a lot of paperwork in VaS. Each ship has its own record sheet, even destroyers. This is great in a multi-player game, where each player has his own squadron of four or five ships, but if there are two of you playing a larger battle, you will be swamped with record keeping as you struggle to track how many torpedoes HMCS Haida has left to shoot. It does seem to set a ceiling on what can be gamed." Fieldhouse concluded that Victory at Sea was not what he was looking for in a naval combat game, commenting, "A Call To Arms was a very successful project for Mongoose, and they are apparently in the process of hatching a new set of sci fi rules that draws heavily on CTA as its game engine, but [Victory at Sea] has simply not worked well for [naval combat set in] WW2."
