= Model warship combat =

Club Combat between RC model warships

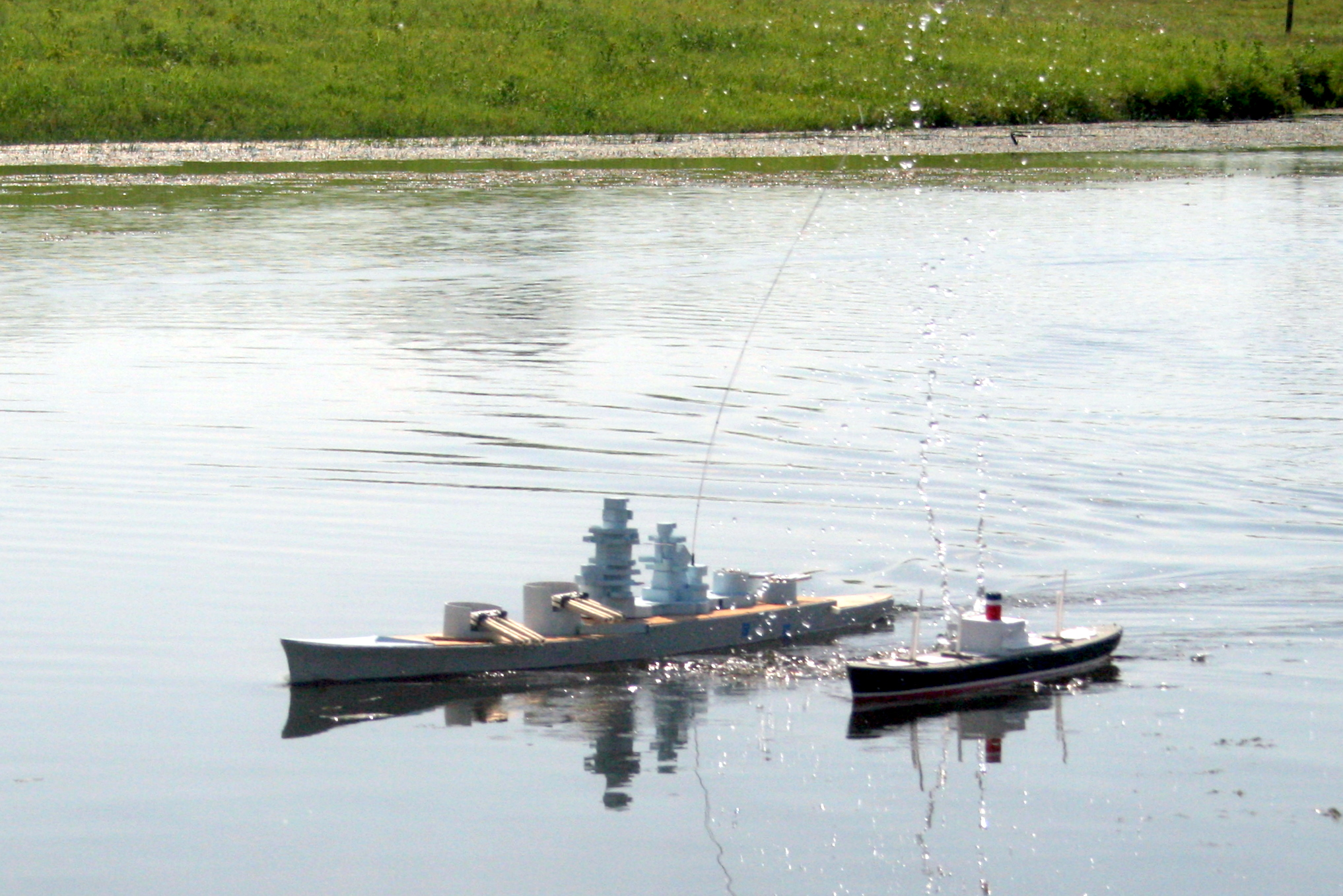
VNS Verdun takes a shot at USS Nathaniel Greene at the 2007 North American Big Gun Open event

Model warship combat is an international club activity, in which participants construct radio-controlled scale models of actual warships, most commonly those built by various nations prior to 1946, such as the USS Des Moines or the German battleship Bismarck. The models are armed with pneumatic cannons, and fight against one another on ponds and lakes. Model warship combat is sometimes considered to be a form of Naval Wargaming, but can also be considered a water-based version of Robot Combat, since much of the internal systems and concepts are the same as radio control electronics, and in some cases possess similar pneumatic systems.

The sport is predominantly divided into 'Big Gun' and 'Fast Gun' (or 'Small Gun') clubs. Both 'Big Gun' and 'Fast Gun' formats host annual national/international inter-club events. There is one major 'Fast Gun' club, the International Radio Control Warship Combat Club (IRCWCC). As of January 2015, the other major club, Model Warship Combat, Incorporated (MWCI) has been dissolved, and its members are being incorporated into IRCWCC. IRCWCC hosts a yearly week-long national event, called "Nats", where the fleets, divided up by historical alliances, (Allied and Axis), wage war against each other. Whichever team has the most points at the end of the week, wins that year's Nationals. 'Big Gun' clubs have the annual event known as North American Big Gun Open (NABGO). Since 2008 - the annual Big Gun Robotic Warship Combat open invitational at California Maker Faire.
The Australian Battle Group (AUSBG) has two annual National Battles, held in January and June.

== History ==
Radio controlled warship combat was invented by a small group of men living in Texas (USA) in the late 1970s. The founding members are Stan Watkins, D.W. Fluegel, and Jeff Poindexter. These men "toyed" with the idea of using radio controlled ships and equipping them with some kind of cannon so that they could then engage in combat, eventually developing the sport.

In 1977, Stan Watkins created the "Mark I" cannon using a variety of plumbing parts. In this early system, freon was used as a propelling agent, resulting in engagements with little if any damage. After some time and further improvements, the group was able to "sink" an opponent in combat by shooting steel balls through balsa wood hulls. Organized groups formed very quickly after this achievement, with the formation of the IRCWCC, Big Gun groups, and the NASWCA in 1982.

The Mark I cannon was made out of a set of valves, a hose, and a freon tank. Iron pipe fittings were affixed to the freon 22 tank, which provided the pressure that powered the gun. Small water valves were used to fill the tank, and to supply pressure to an O-ring spool valve. When the gun was not in the fire position, the O-ring separated the pressure source from the magazine hose; however, when the radio control unit was activated the servo moved the spool valve into position, allowing freon to flow from the pressurized tank to the magazine hose. As the magazine was pressurized, BBs flowed into the restrictor tube until the pressure built high enough to force the BBs through the restrictor and out of the barrel. The exit velocity of the BBs was high enough to punch holes in the model ship’s 1/32 inch balsa wood skin. However, this linear magazine and barrel assembly was too bulky to be fit to a small model ship’s gun turret. To improve scale appearance, a brass elbow fitting was added to reduce the above deck size of the gun. This enabled the magazine to exit the deck vertically, with the BBs running into the base leg of the elbow before entering the restrictor. This led to the development of the new Mk II breach/barrel assembly. The first Mk II was installed on Stan Watkins' model of the USS Arizona (l/144 scale). The BBs (about 100) were loaded into a clear hose which, when pressurised, would feed the BBs into a smaller clear plastic tubing behind the barrel brass tubing. The pressure would build until the force pushed the BBs through the restrictor tubing and out the barrel. The force of this design had adequate power to penetrate the 1/32 balsa hull skin. The design of the restrictor caused a number of BBs to “spurt” out each time the pressure was great enough, however to have sufficient pressure to get more than one spurt, the warship combatant had to rapidly close the spool valve after the start of the spurt. This was made possible as the freon feed hoses were very thin, and had low flow.

After several decades of technological advances, the hobby has improved dramatically in both reliability and playability. Many different groups having formed, fighting scale model warships ranging from the reasonably rare 1:48 scale to the most common 1:144 scale, with several different and regional variations on the rules used.

== Design conventions and model construction ==
Extensive design conventions exist to provide that the fighting effectiveness under various conditions remain proportional to the prototype vessels. These conventions also dictate safety features as well as mandating design features to allow for recovery of defeated vessels.

The model warships are fully functional, with small electric motors or servo-operated sails for propulsion, servo-operated steering systems, and armaments consisting of self-reloading pneumatic cannons.

The models cannot be purchased, unlike many scale models, and instead must be built from scratch. There are, however, several suppliers that sell many of the necessary parts for construction, such as Strike Models and Battlers Connection.

=== Mechanical systems ===
While many models use a combination of switches and/or relays physically actuated by servos to control the propulsion system, most newer models now use either Electronic Speed Control units or solid-state switching boards, such as those found in Robot combat, greatly reducing the complexity of the wiring of the propulsion system. Propulsion is provided by electric motors coupled to shafts passing through stuffing tubes driving semi-scale propellers. All active mechanical systems are required to be operated via electrical or pneumatic means. Any and all mechanisms relying upon chemical combustion which could contaminate the water with fuels, oils, or other chemicals are banned.

=== Weapons systems ===
The cannons use steel balls ranging from .177" to .25" in diameter as projectiles, typically propelled by CO_{2} or compressed air. As of 2009, a small number of smaller "Big Gun" ships are equipped with cannons powered by compression springs. In Big Gun combat, club rules usually include provisions for the arming of torpedoes, usually represented by a fixed cannon firing 0.25" diameter projectiles. Although individuals have attempted to construct self-propelled 0.25" diameter torpedoes, their use has yet to be formally documented or demonstrated. Additionally, vendors have demonstrated working prototypes of weapons control systems suitable for Big Gun combat that would enable multiple turrets on a single vessel to be coordinated as a single weapons battery, allowing multiple weapons to simultaneously target a single vessel. All Pyrotechnics are specifically banned from use to protect the safety of people and animals, in addition to preventing environmental damage.

=== Cannon types ===
- Arizona Cannon/Single Barrel Gun System - easy to manufacture cannon named after one of the first model ships in which it was successfully implemented
- Ball-bearing interrupter - one or two steel balls in-line with the gas supply line interrupts the feed of ammunition into the breech, ensuring that only one projectile is fired at a time
- JC White Rotating Cannon - first widely successful multi-barrel rotating turret
- JC White Torpedo cannon - similar to the rotating cannon without the rotating magazine on top
- Indiana Cannon - a refinement of the JC White Rotating Cannon so named due to the US State in which it was first manufactured. Evolution of the JC White design into the Indiana Cannon marked the point at which the design encountered widespread adoption in the Big Gun format.
- Jam elbow -
- Negative pressure/Quick Exhaust Valve - Typically uses a Clippard Exhaust Valve in its construction and relies upon a discharge of pressure from a pneumatic control circuit to actuate the cannon.
- O-ring breech -
- Piston interrupter - a "piston" in-line with the gas supply line interrupts the feed of ammunition into the breech, ensuring that only one projectile is fired at a time
- Sliding breech -
- Spring-loaded breech -
- Spring-fired/Spring-powered cannon - instead of directly utilizing exclusively compressed gas to impart kinetic energy to the projectile, a spring affixed to a piston to compress gas in a chamber or a spring directly acting on the projectile is used.
- Spurt cannon - a spurt cannon is a type of fast gun cannon that lacks a mechanism to interrupt feeding of steel balls into the breech. Subsequently, it will continuously fire until either the supply of ammunition or compressed gas is depleted.

=== Cannon configuration ===
- Depressing - due to concerns for safety and the goal of inflicting damage to an opposing ship at or below the waterline, cannon can be configured to incorporate negative elevation with an adjustable mechanism
- Fixed - Fixed cannon cannot be trained, requiring the captain to maneuver the ship to bring them to bear on a target instead.
- Rotating - To enable a ship to bring the maximum possible firepower to bear on a given target, cannon can be equipped with a mechanism to facilitate rotation if the corresponding cannon on the real ship were so equipped. Additionally, cannon rotation permit a ship to continue to fire upon a target while maneuvering, potentially increasing the number of successful hits within a given period of time. While uncommon in Fast Gun due to a combination of complexity and limited tactical benefit, cannon rotation is common in the Big Gun format.

=== Ammunition magazine configuration ===
- Straight-magazine — Steel ball ammunition is housed in a relatively straight length of rigid or flexible tubing and can be gravity or force-fed into the cannon breech.
- Coil-magazine - Ammunition is housed in tubing as with the straight-magazine configuration; however, the magazine tubing is tightly coiled, sometimes around the cannon riser and/or valve so as to reduce the longitudinal volume required for the cannon. Ammunition can be gravity or force-fed into the cannon breech.
- Canister-magazine - In a canister-magazine configuration, ammunition is housed within a cylindrical chamber integrated into the cannon body. Ammunition is typically gravity-fed into the cannon breech.

=== Structure ===
While some early vessels were built in 1/150 scale, scales have become standardized with the most common construction scale of 1:144, although 1:96, 1:72 and 1:48 scale modeling groups also do exist. The majority of hulls are constructed from either fiberglass (with penetration windows cut into it), or scratch built with wood ribs. The exteriors of the ship's hulls are sheeted balsa wood, which allows the relatively low velocity cannon projectiles to penetrate them. The penetration is intended to let in water, with the model sinking if the onboard bilge pumps cannot compensate for the rate at which water enters the hull. Superstructures are often constructed with a combination of lightweight wood, plastic sheets, thermoset plastic resins, and corrosion-resistant metals. Smaller vessels such as light cruisers and destroyers often incorporate a less-durable but lighter superstructure in order to maximize the displacement available for weapons systems. After combat, the models typically escape real damage other than that to the balsa skin, and can typically be patched and turned around in 15–30 minutes.

== Combat formats ==
=== Campaign ===
Instead of a single battle, multiple battles or sorties are combined to form a campaign of combat events, sometimes with a preceding battle dictating the available of rearming opportunities afforded to a team in the following battle. A campaign can also consist of multiple objective-oriented battles, or team free-for-all battles.

=== Free-for-all ===
Typically held in sessions divided by vessel combat units or combat value, during a free-for-all each captain operates his or her vessel to sink or damage as many of the other vessels on the water as possible while minimizing the damage incurred. It is often played in a "last-man-standing" format where the winning vessel is identified simply as the last to sink or be disabled.

=== Objective ===
Objective format combat is typically executed in the form of a scenario, requiring each team to accomplish specific objectives to earn points and/or win the scenario. Such combat may involve sides of asymmetrical strength, such as when attempting to simulate a recreation of a historic battle.

=== Team free-for-all ===
One of the most common combat format across the different model warship clubs, team free-for-all involves the division of players present into two teams that are equal based upon a combat strength rubric (i.e. units in Fast Gun or a combination of displacement tonnage and cannon count in Big Gun), which then sortie against each other in accordance with the club's rules and scoring system.

== Club formats ==
=== Big Gun ===
NTXBG's Richelieu and Missouri duke it out on the water

Kagero (1/72 scale) stern damage

Unlike Fast Gun clubs, Big Gun clubs operate based upon a loose confederation, with each club reserving the ability to establish and maintain its own rules, provided that they coincide with the spirit of Big Gun Model Warship Combat. With versions in 1/48, 1/72, 1/96, and 1/144 scale, Big Gun Model Warship combat clubs have provisions for cannon caliber and armor thickness to be scaling according to what existed on the prototype vessel. Big Gun Model Warships allow weapons to be installed in rotating turrets as if they were mounted on the historical vessel. Damage Control is accomplished via a centrifugal bilge pump capable pumping a regulated volume of water out of the hull. The volume allowed is based on the prototype vessel's displacement. Typically, the flow rate varies from 30 gallons per hour (GPH) for the smallest ships to 90GPH for the largest ships.

Big Gun clubs are largely descended from the now defunct "North American Warship Combat Association" (NASWCA) dating back to late 1981/early 1982.

=== Fast/Small Gun ===
Principally known as Fast Gun by its members due to few restrictions on rate of fire, this format is sometimes also identified as Small Gun because of its exclusive use of .177" (BB) caliber guns. About 80% of active clubs are of the fast gun variety, in which all ships are built in 1/144 scale and use .177" caliber guns, which in most cases are installed in fixed mounts but may rotate depending upon ship class. Additionally, all ships are fitted with a standardized 1/32" thick balsa wood 'Armor' to yield an easily penetrable hull. Damage control is accomplished through the use of centrifugal bilge pumps fitted with either a 1/8" or 1/16" diameter flow restrictor. Clubs that follow this format include the International Radio-Controlled Warship Combat Club (IRCWCC) and Model Warship Combat, Incorporated (MWCI).

A subset or adaptation of small gun is known as Treaty Combat. Treaty Combat, abbreviated simply as Treaty, incorporates uniform caliber weapons, armor, and combat units in a way similar to that defined in IRCWCC or MWCI rules; however, speeds and pump capacities are limited based upon the prototype vessel and displacement, respectively. Thus, Treaty Combat incorporates some of the reduced-cost aspects of the Fast Gun format with some of the scaled characteristics of Big Gun.
