= Ship model =

Scale reproduction of a ship

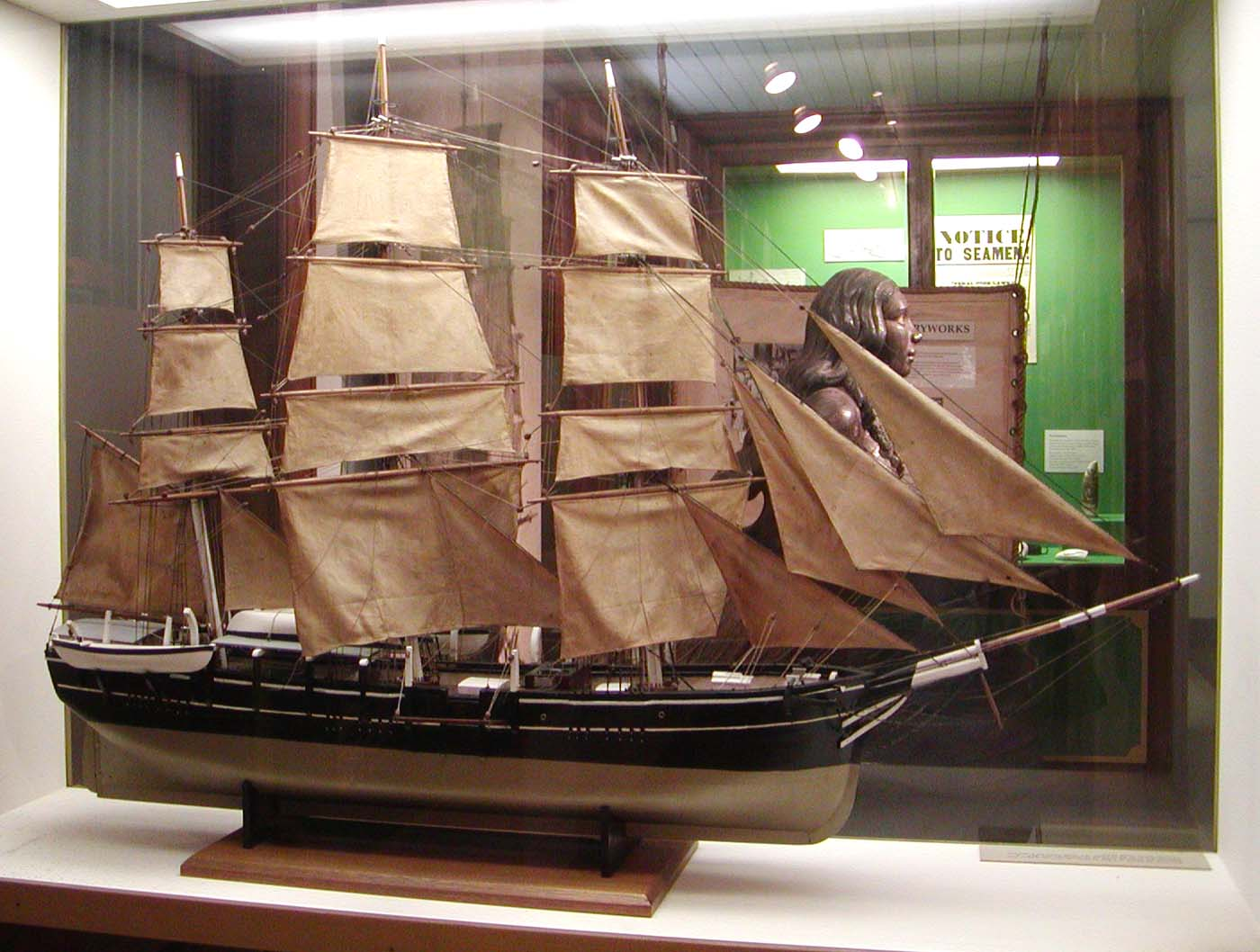
Model of a 19th-century vessel in the Bishop Museum, Hawaii

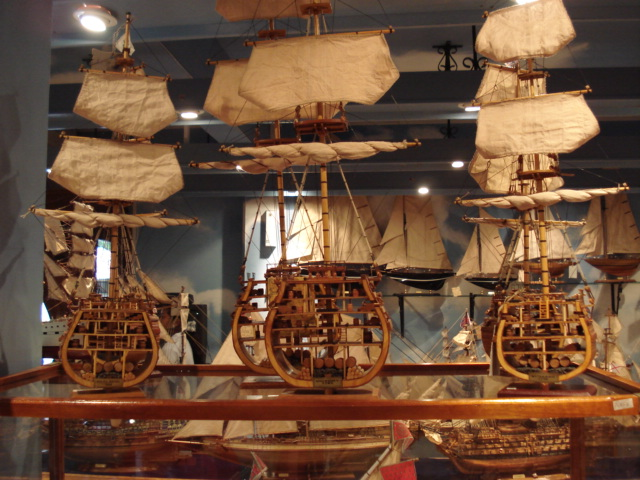
Model ship cross sections on display in a shop in Mauritius

Ship models or model ships are scale models of ships. They can range in size from 1/6000 scale wargaming miniatures to large vessels capable of holding people.

Ship modeling is a craft as old as shipbuilding itself, stretching back to ancient times when water transport was first developed.

== History ==
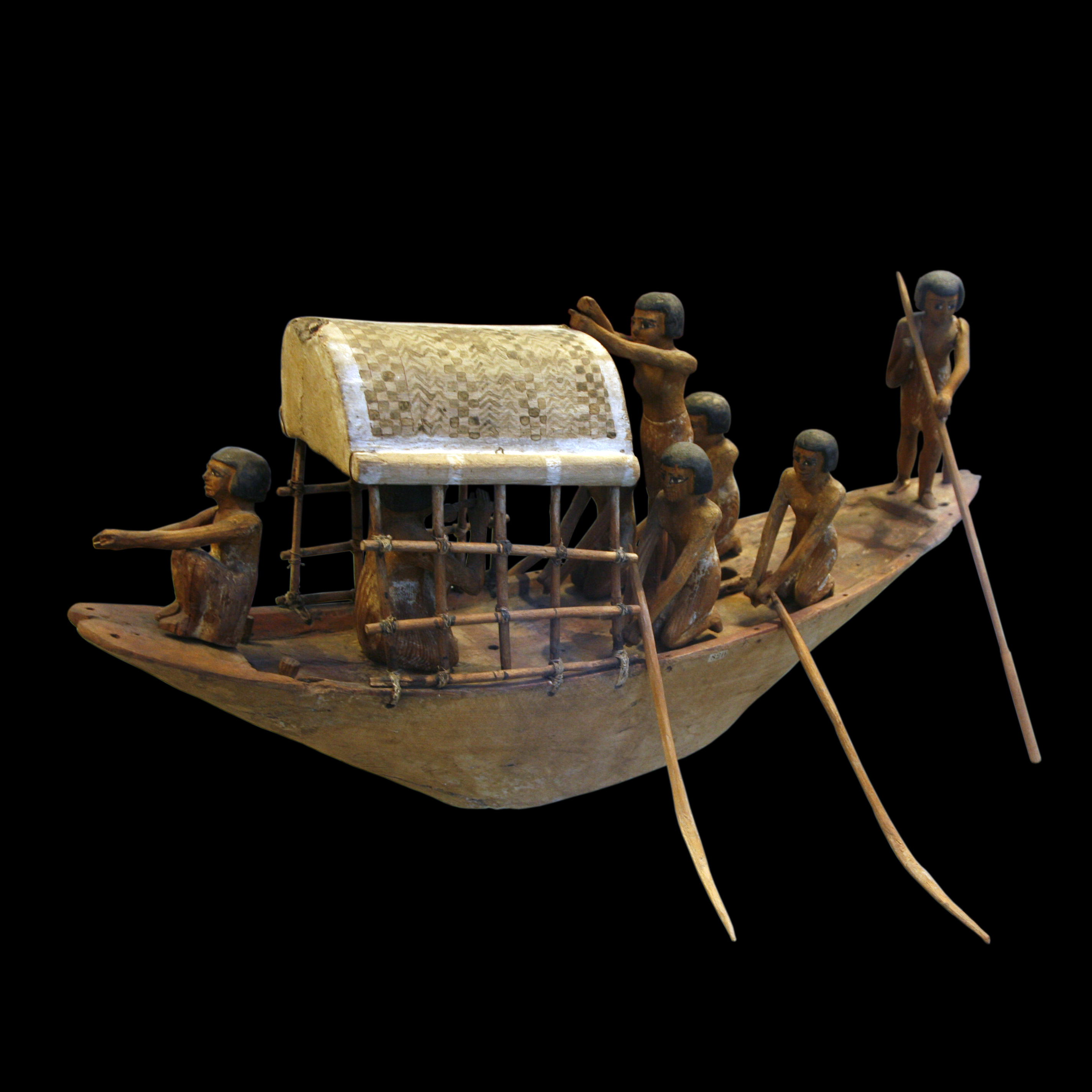
Model ship from a tomb, Ancient Egypt, c. 2000 BCE

=== Ancient Mediterranean ===
Ancient ship and boat models have been discovered throughout the Mediterranean, especially from ancient Greece, Egypt, and Phoenicia. These models provide archaeologists with valuable information regarding seafaring technology and the sociological and economic importance of seafaring. In spite of how helpful ancient boat and ship models are to archaeologists, they are not always easily or correctly interpreted due to artists’ mistakes, ambiguity in the model design, and wear and tear over the centuries.

Ships "were among the most technologically complex mechanisms of the ancient world." Ships made far-flung travel and trade more comfortable and economical, and they added a whole new facet to warfare. Thus, ships carried a great deal of significance to the people of the ancient world, and this is expressed partly through the creation of boat and ship models. Ancient boat and ship models are made of a variety of materials and are intended for different purposes. The most common purposes for boat and ship models include burial votives, house hold articles, art, and toys. While archaeologists have found ship and boat models from societies all around the Mediterranean, the three of the most prolific ship model building cultures were the Greeks, Phoenicians, and Egyptians.

Archaeologists have determined that Ancient Greek ship models were used as burial or votive offerings and as household articles such as lamps or drinking vessels. The kinds of ships depicted in Ancient Greek models can be classified broadly as small craft, merchant vessels, and warships. Models were cast in different materials, including wood, bronze, lead, and clay.

Greek warships were popular subjects to be made in miniature. One particular model, acquired by the Staatliches Museum (engl.: Land museum) in Kassel, Germany, proves to be helpful to archaeologists and historians in understanding what a hemiolia warship was like. Archaeologists have tentatively dated the Kassel model to be from the 6th or 5th centuries BC through iconographic and literary sources. This ship model is made of clay and features a distinctive prow shaped like a boar's head that is described by Herodotus in The History, and depicted on pottery, coins seals and drinking cups. The model is a miniature of a vessel that would have been too small to be a typical warship. The presence of holes bored into 8 thwarts in the ship suggests that the thwarts may have been seats for a pegged-in dummy crew. If the holes bored into the thwarts are indeed meant to accommodate a dummy crew, the crew seating would have been arranged with two men per bench amidships, and one man per bench fore and aft where the ship narrows so that there is only room for one man. Alec Tilley (former Royal Navy and Navy of Oman officer) suggests that a small ship with this type of seating arrangement would have been called a hemiolia, or a one-and-a-halfer. The name indicates that two oarsmen would have been seated on half of the benches and one on the others. Until this ship model was discovered, archaeologists, classicists, and historians had only been able to hypothesize on what the seating arrangement might have been like on a hemiolia based on its name.

Not all ancient Greek ship models are of warships. One boat model from a house deposit in Mochlos, Crete, dating to around 3000BC, is thought to be too small to be a war ship. Belgian maritime historian L.Basch postulates that the boat "cannot have been propelled by more than four oarsmen … so it can hardly be other than a fishing boat." As opposed to other Early Bronze Age ship and boat models, this model was not found in a burial context. This model is thought to be a child's toy or a piece of art, instead of a burial offering. The model itself features a projection of the keel beyond the stem-post at both ends. Despite appearances, these projections are not rams. Because the model is depicting a fishing boat, there would be no need for rams. This model in particular has helped archaeologists understand that not all keel projections in depictions of boats during this time are necessarily rams. Instead, keel projections on depictions of Bronze Age ships are explained as cut-waters or as beaching protection.

Phoenician ship models also provide archaeologists information regarding the technical aspects of seafaring, and the cultural importance of seafaring for the ancient Phoenicians. However, some models offer tantalizing pieces of information that are, however, difficult to interpret. Item number H-3134 at the Hecht Museum, a dark-brown clay model of a 5th-century BCE oared boat, is one such craft. The vessel has no provenance, save for the reported location of its discovery off the Phoenician coast, but scientists have been able to tentatively confirm the origin and authenticity of this model. The model is of an oared boat manned by three pairs of oarsmen, who are rendered with "hands … raised to their chests, in the last instant of pulling the oar in the water, before lifting it for the recovery." The mystery of this model is the purpose of small holes- three on the starboard side, and four on port- that were made in the sides of the ship with a sharp tool before the clay dried. It is believed that the holes are too small to pass an oar through, and thus would not be used for rowing purposes. This is hard to prove, however, because the poorly preserved state of the model and the amount of fouling that is layered on the model makes it difficult to definitively rule out this possibility. Another theory regarding the purpose of these holes suggests that "ropes for holding oars were threaded through these holes."

Ship models are helpful to archaeologists in that they allow archaeologists to make estimates regarding the size the vessel would be in real life. While this technique makes the assumption that artists scaled the models appropriately, it is useful to get some sense of how large these ships and boats may have been in real life. Archaeologists estimate the Phoenician vessel above (H-3134) to be about 6 meters long and the beam about 2 meters. Archaeologists are able to calculate these estimates of size by employing a series of assumptions about the distance between benches, the lateral distance between rowers, and a maximum draft of the vessel.

Egyptian ship and boat models are perhaps some of the most well-preserved types of ship models available to archaeologists. Ancient Egyptian ship and boat models were most frequently placed in tombs of prominent people as "magical substitutes for the actual objects which the deceased has used in life and which he expected to use again in the next world." These boats have been categorised into two types: boat models that represent actual vessels used on the Nile, and boat models that represent boats that are considered necessary for religious purposes. The second type of model may or may not have been used in real life, but were purely magical boats. The majority of boats found in tombs are carved from wood.

Several boat and ship models were found in the tomb of Tutankhamen, dating back to the Sixth Dynasty, and in the tomb of Meketre (2061–2010 BC). The wide variety of vessels depicted by the models in these two tombs has provided archaeologists new information on the types of boats that were used in Egypt. Moreover, the presence of boat and ship models in the tombs attests to the paramount importance of boats and ships to the Nile-going people of Egypt.

The boat models discovered at Meketre's tomb feature several different kinds of boats, including traveling boats, sporting boats, and several papyriform crafts. Two of the papyriform skiffs have a trawling net slung between them. It is uncertain whether or not the net is meant to be depicted as being under the water or being pulled out of the water by the fishermen. In the event that the artist meant for the net to be in the water, it is upside down. Needless to say, the upside down net would not work for catching fish. This ambiguity points up the question of artistic veracity of the craftsmen who make ship models. As is attested by the ambiguity of the holes in the sides of the Phoenician model, and the skiff from Meketre, archaeologists need to be aware of the possibility of artistic error while interpreting ancient ship models. While a mistake involving an inverted trawling net may seem trivial, the lesson is important. It is important for archaeologists to be aware of the possibility that ancient artists may not have been familiar with the finer details of ships and boats.

Despite some of the limitations of interpreting ancient Mediterranean ship models, archaeologists have been able to glean a great deal of information from these items. This information has been instrumental in filling in gaps in knowledge about ancient seafaring technology and culture.

=== Europe ===
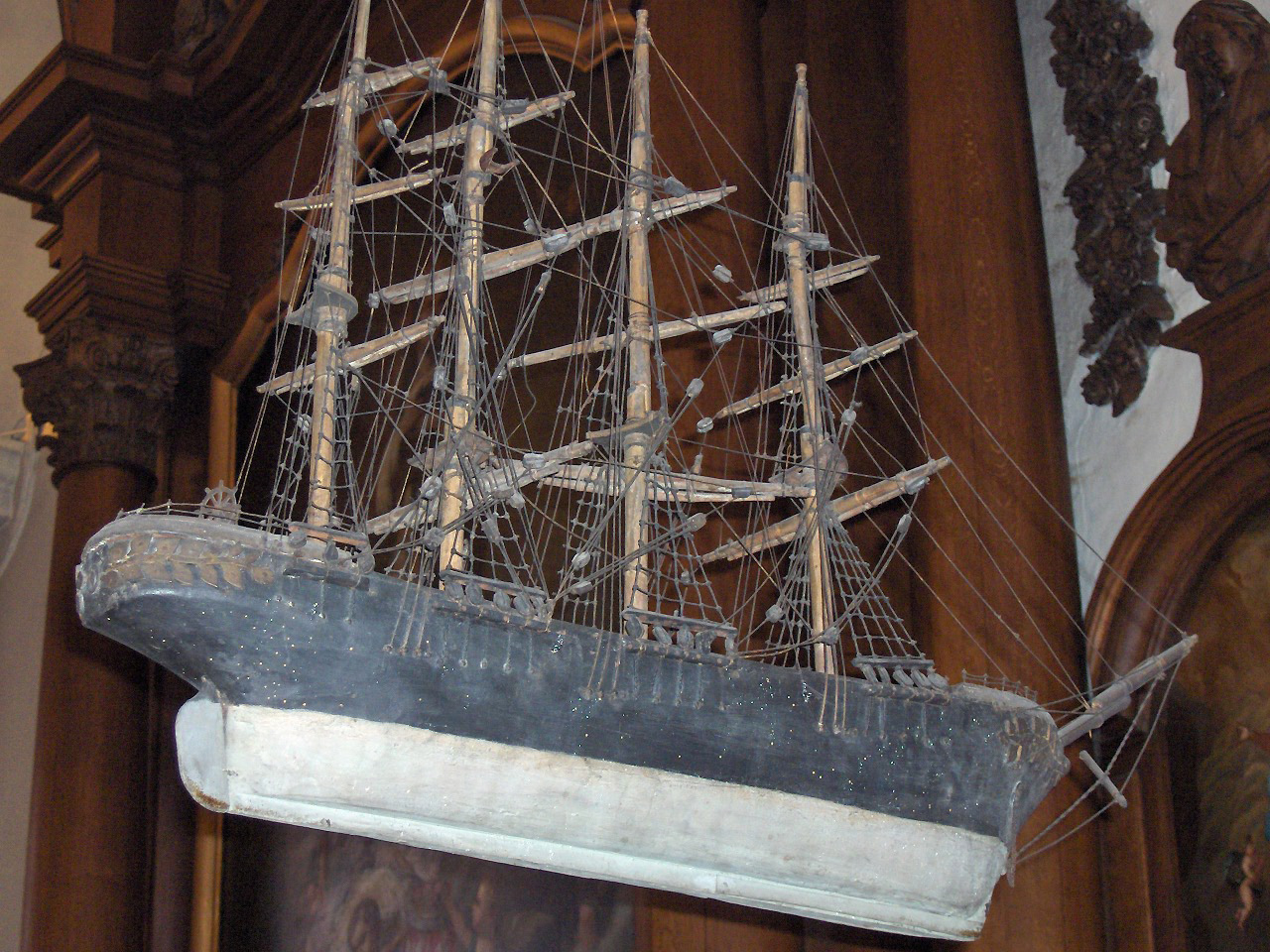
Church votive hanging in a church; the workmanship is somewhat crude, but sufficient to identify it as mid-19th-century

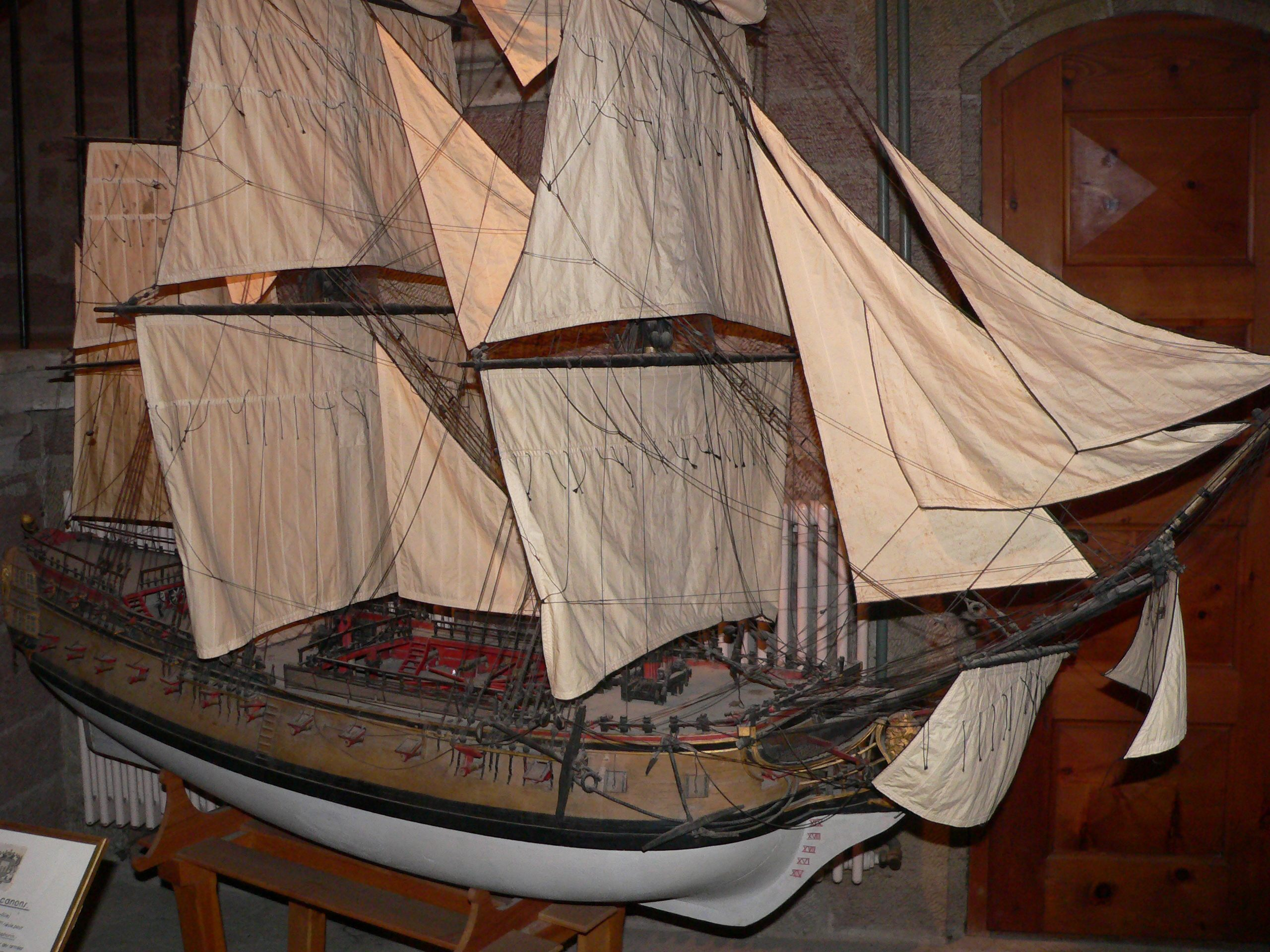
Model of a 19th-century English frigate

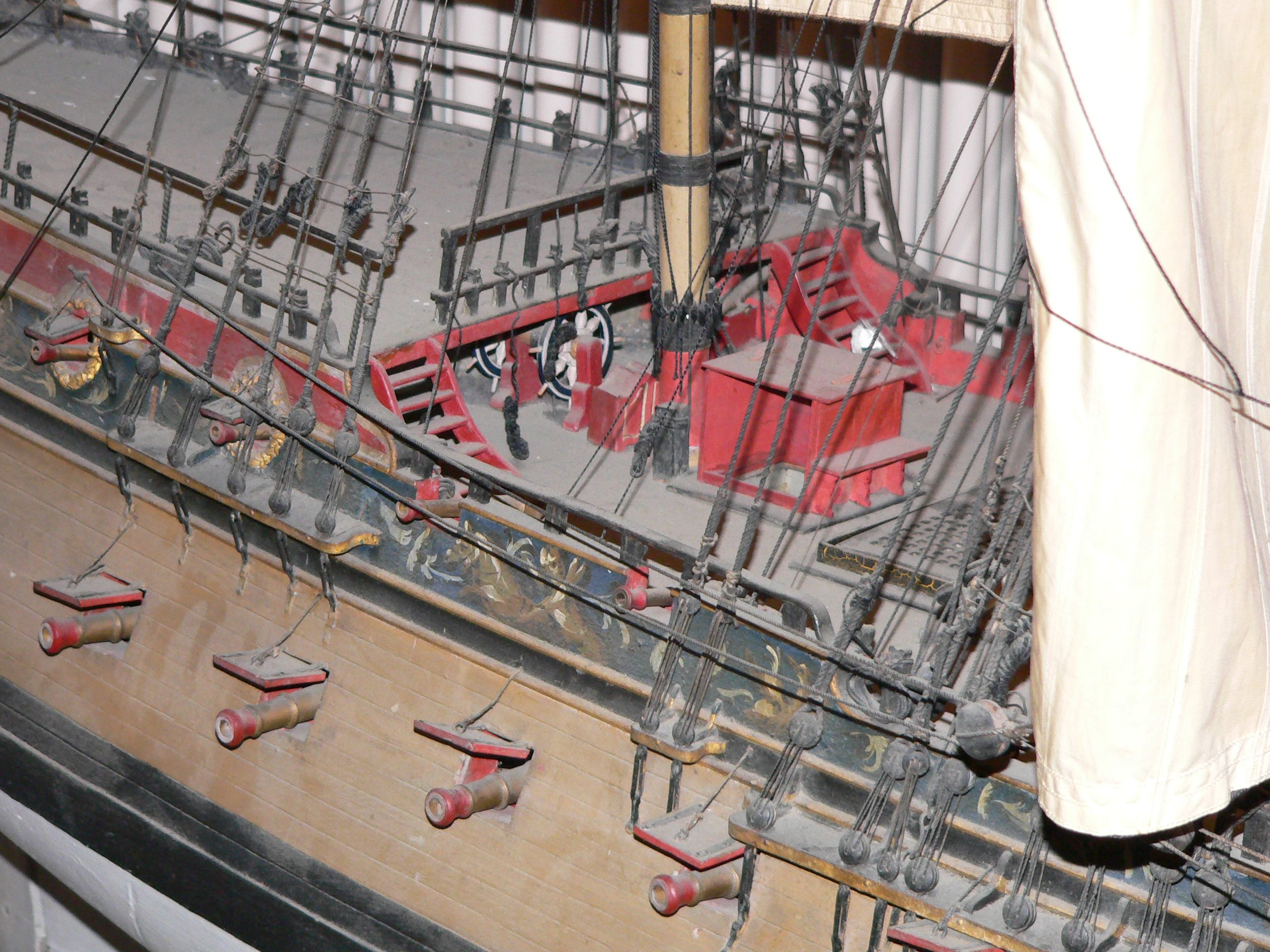
Closeup of the frigate's quarterdeck, showing quality of the detail.

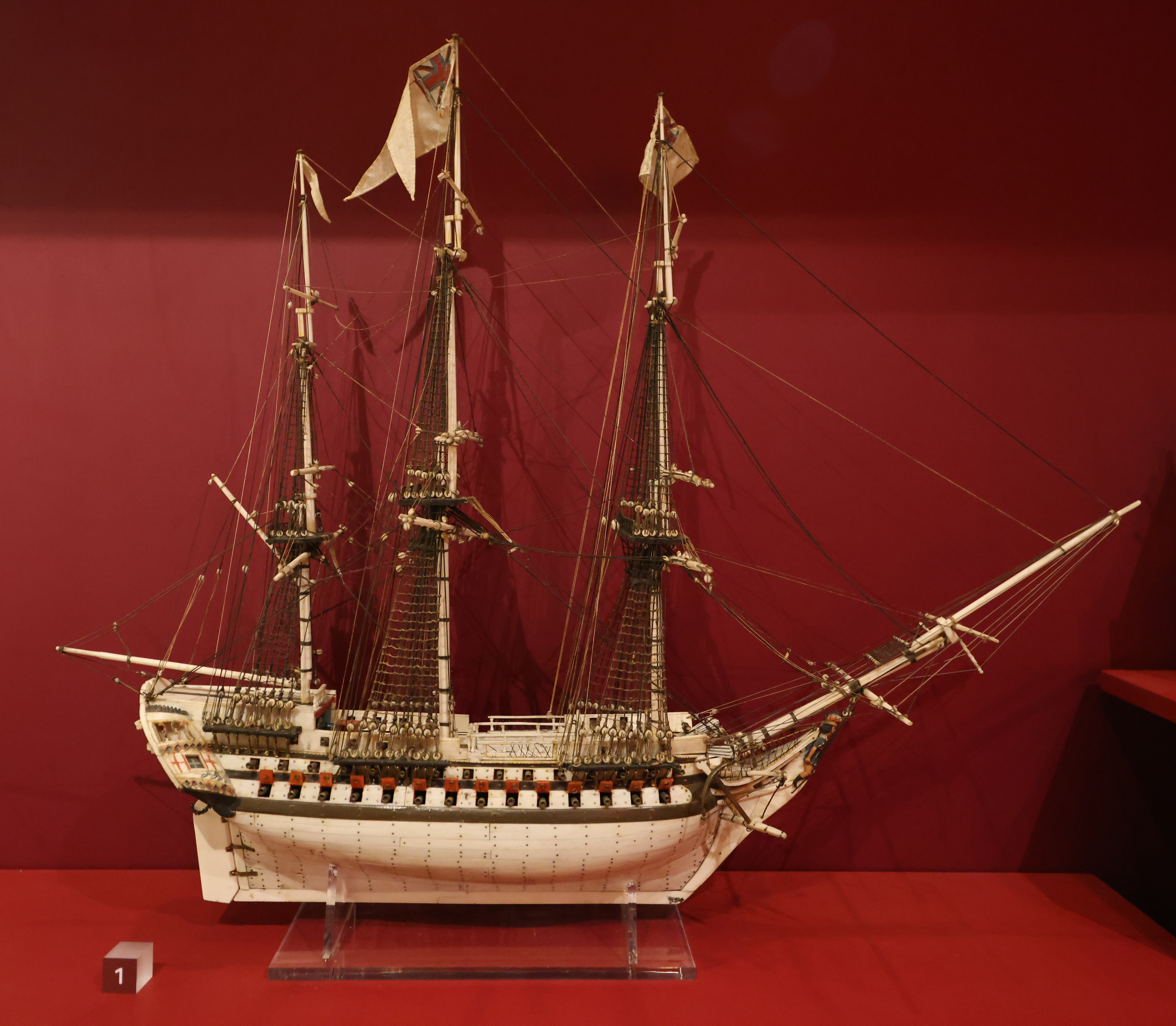
Prisoner-of-war ship model at the Peterborough Museum and Art Gallery in Peterborough.

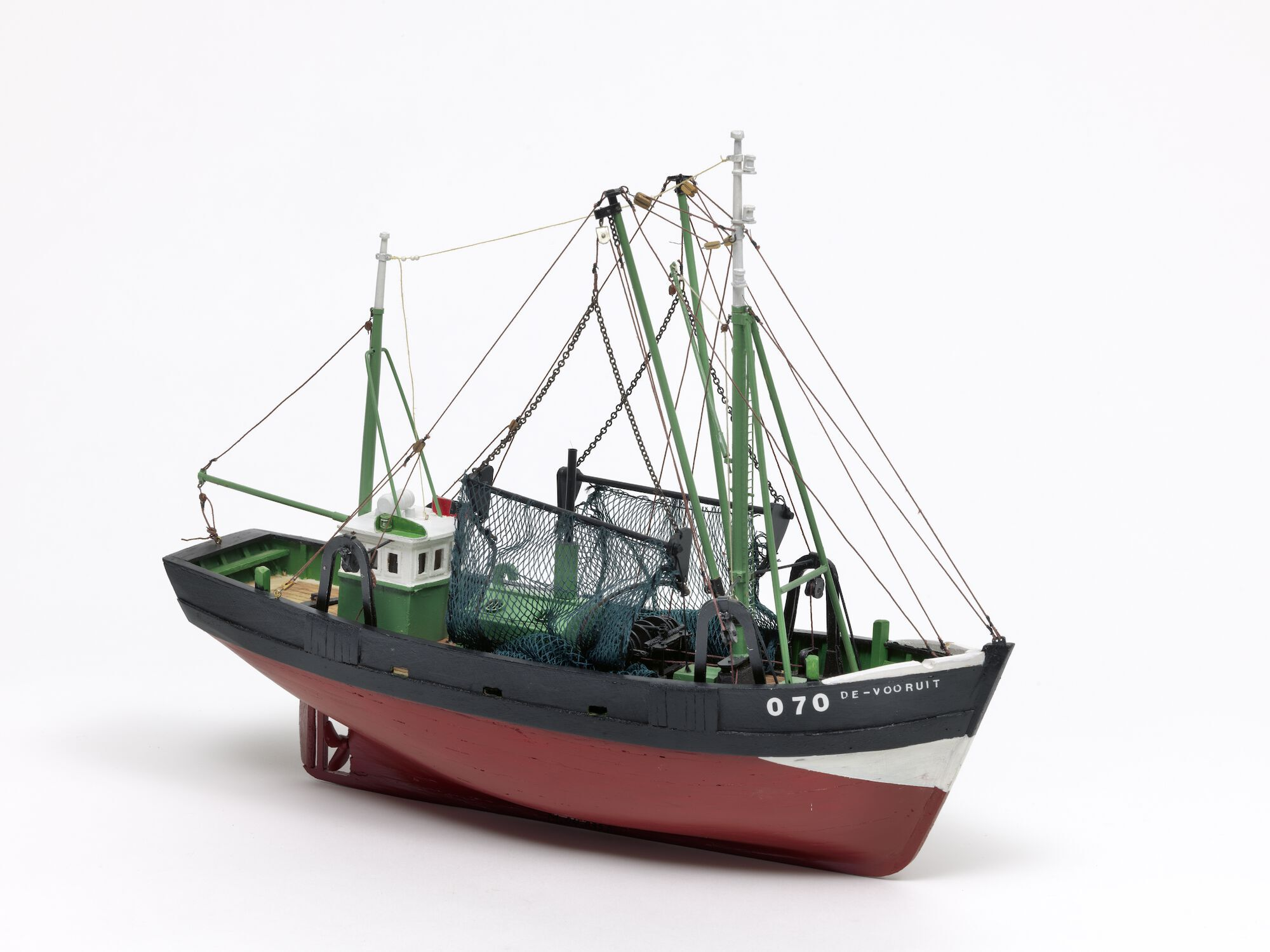
Model ship fishing boat, NAVIGO National Fisheries Museum, Koksijde-Oostduinkerke

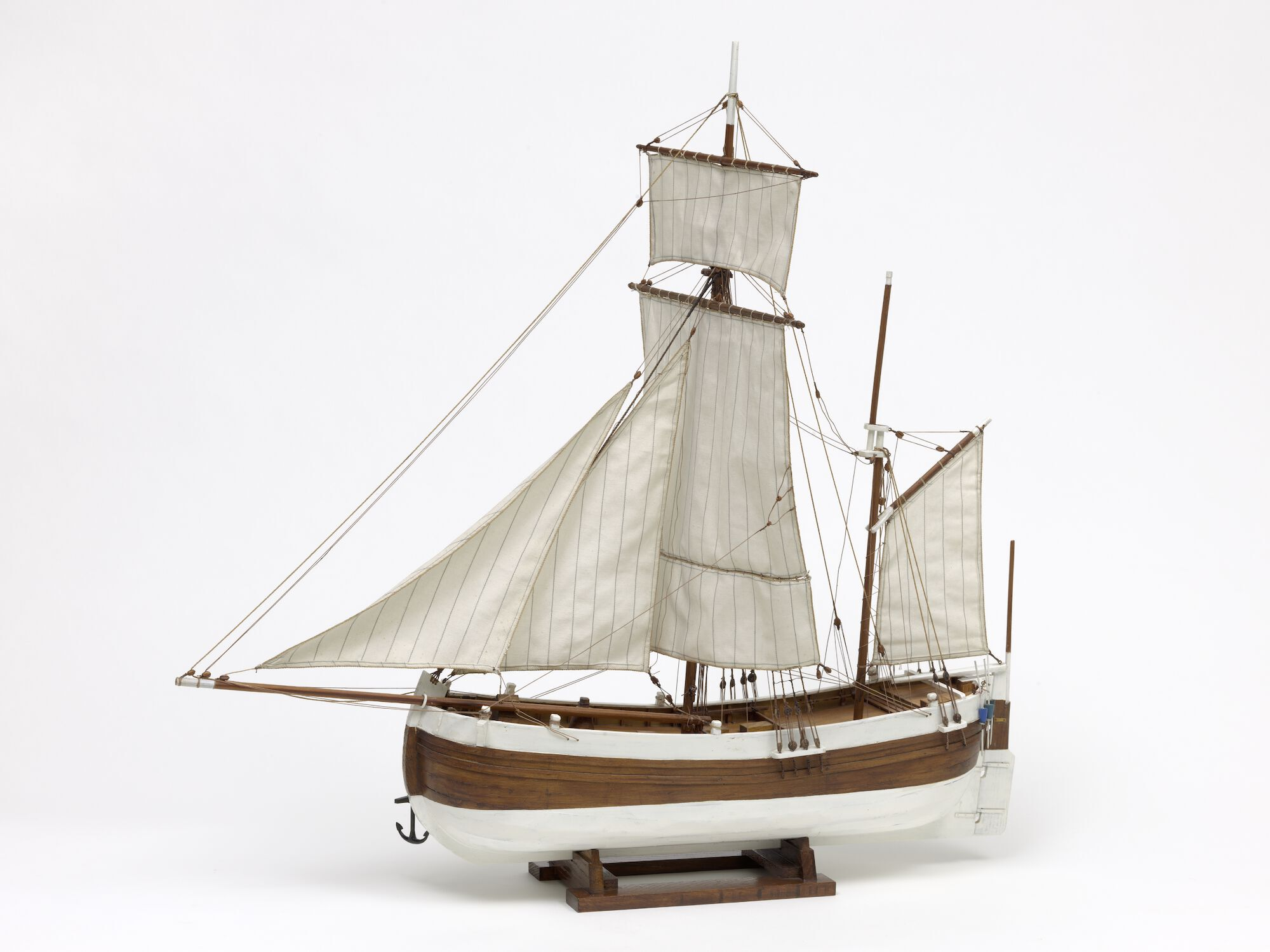
A 17th century fish-hooker model, NAVIGO National Fisheries Museum, Koksijde-Oostduinkerke

Some of the oldest surviving European ship models have been those of early craft such as galleys, galleons, and possibly carracks, dating from the 12th through the 15th centuries and found occasionally mounted in churches, where they were used in ceremonies to bless ships and those who sailed in them, or as votive offerings for successful voyages or surviving peril at sea, a practice which remained common in Catholic countries until the 19th century.

Until the early 18th century, virtually all European small craft and many larger vessels were built without formal plans being drawn. Shipwrights would construct models to show prospective customers how the full size ship would appear and to illustrate advanced building techniques. These were also useful for marine artists, and it is clear that from Dutch Golden Age Painting onwards extensive use of models was made by artists.

Ship models constructed for the Royal Navy were referred to as Admiralty models and were principally constructed during the 18th and 19th centuries to depict proposed warship design. Although many of these models did not illustrate the actual timbering or framing, they did show the form of the hull and usually had great detail of the deck furnishings, masts, spars, and general configuration. Some of these grand models were decorated with carvings of great beauty and were evidently constructed by teams of artisans.

Admiralty models served to educate civilians who were involved in the financing or some other aspect of the ship, to avoid construction errors that might have evolved as the ship itself took form.

During the Napoleonic Wars French and English seamen who were taken prisoner were confined, sometimes for many years, and in their boredom sought relief by building ship models from scraps of wood and bone. This evolved into something of an art form and the models were sold to the public, which responded by supplying the prisoners with ivory so that the models would be more decorative. For the most part, the models had carved wooden hulls with rigging made from human hair, horsehair, silk, or whatever other fine material could be obtained. Bone or ivory would be used for masts and spars, and as a thin veneer over the hull.

A consequence of Britain's naval supremacy in the eighteenth and nineteenth centuries was wide public interest in ships and ship models. Numerous fairly crude models were built as children's toys leading to the creation of functional, as opposed to decorative, ship models. Britain also led the world in model ship sailing clubs – in 1838 the Serpentine Sailing Society was started in Hyde Park, followed by the first London Model Yacht Club in 1845. By the 1880s there were three model sailing clubs sharing the Kensington Gardens Round Pond alone.

=== Modern era ===
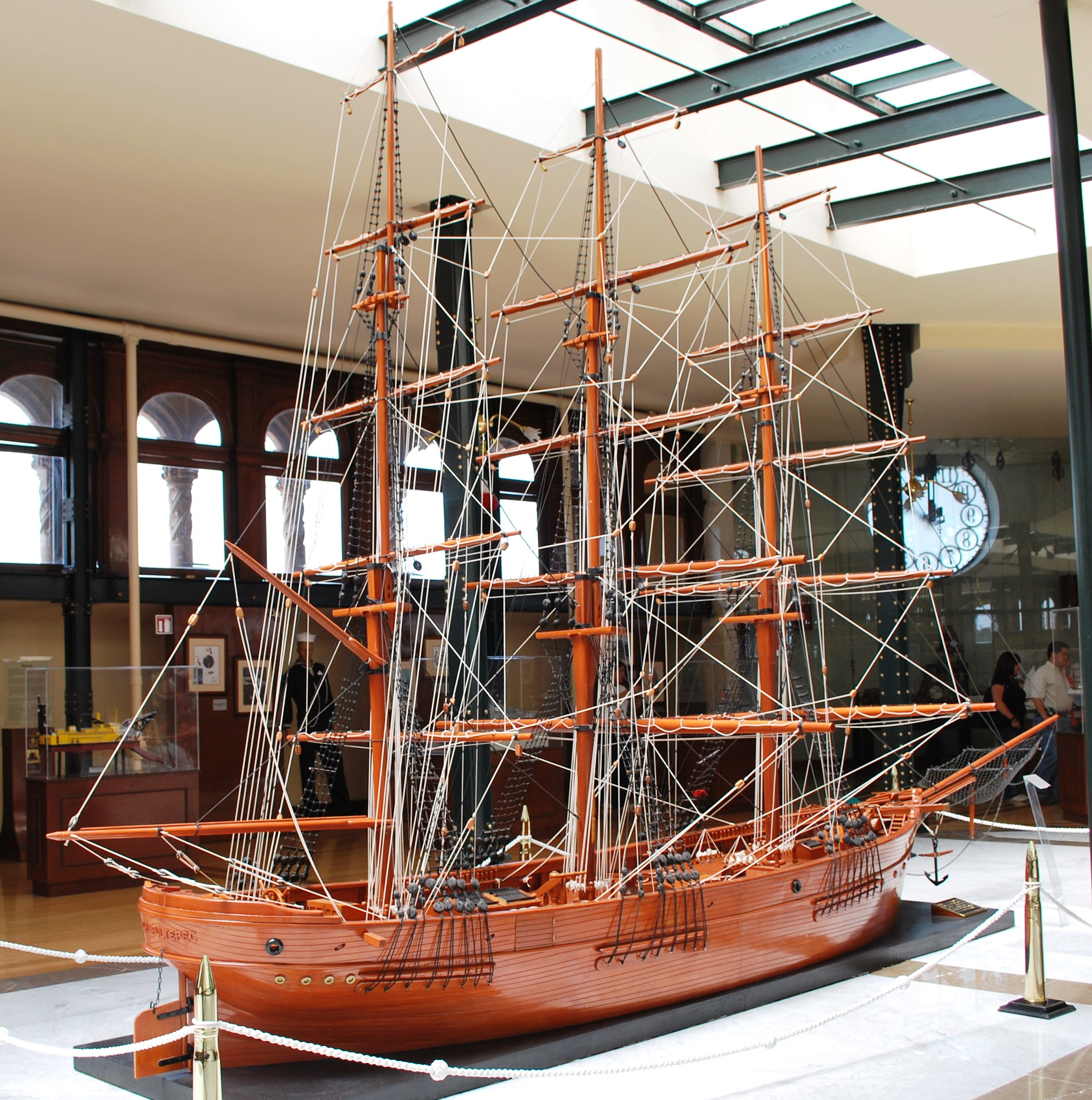
Model of a frigate at the Naval History Museum located in the Palacio de Correos de Mexico.

In the early part of the 20th century, amateur ship model kits became available from companies such as Bassett-Lowke in Great Britain and Boucher's in the United States. Early 20th century models comprised a combination of wooden hulls and cast lead for anchors, deadeyes, and rigging blocks. These materials gradually gave way to plastic precast sets.

The development of tinplate and improvements in machine tools enabled significant advances in ship modelling from 1900 onwards. Thin, workable sheets of iron could be coated with tin to prevent rusting, then mass-produced as parts of ship model kits. The process was pioneered by French ship model manufacturer Radiguet, which produced a line of zinc boats with pressurised steam engines, wooden decking and brass fittings. The speed of production for tinplate vessels enabled one 1909 manufacturer to produce ship models of speedboats that had competed that year in Monaco.

Ship modelling in the United States experienced a boom in the late 1920s when Popular Science magazine published an extended series of articles and plans for famous ships by modeller and former Navy officer E. Armitage McCann. McCann, who, according to Popular Science was the "recognized leader of the ship model building hobby" of his time founded the Ship Model Makers′ Club in 1929, with him as secretary and treasurer and marine artist and fellow ship model builder Gordon Grant as president.

The world's leading magazine for this hobby, Model Boat, is published from the UK by MyTime Media and has been in print continuously since 1950. In recent years, widespread internet access has played a major role in promoting ship modelling, offering enthusiasts the opportunity to show off their work and share techniques. Internet sites such as Modelwarships.com, Steelnavy.com, or Model Shipwrights are oriented to plastic model ship builders, while others such as Hyperscale focus largely on aircraft or other subjects can regularly feature plastic ship models as well.

== Types of construction ==
The most common materials used for ship models are:

- Wood—commonly solid wood, two pieces of wood with a vertical seam or slabs of wood placed one on top of each other.
- Plastic—including both injected styrene and cast resin models. In larger scales (1/192 and larger), fiberglass is often used for hull shells.
- Metal—usually cast lead or other alloys. Steel, sheet tin and aluminum brass are used less frequently for hull construction, but are used extensively for adding details.
- Paper—preprinted paper construction kits are common in Europe, and are available in a variety of scales.

=== Wooden ===
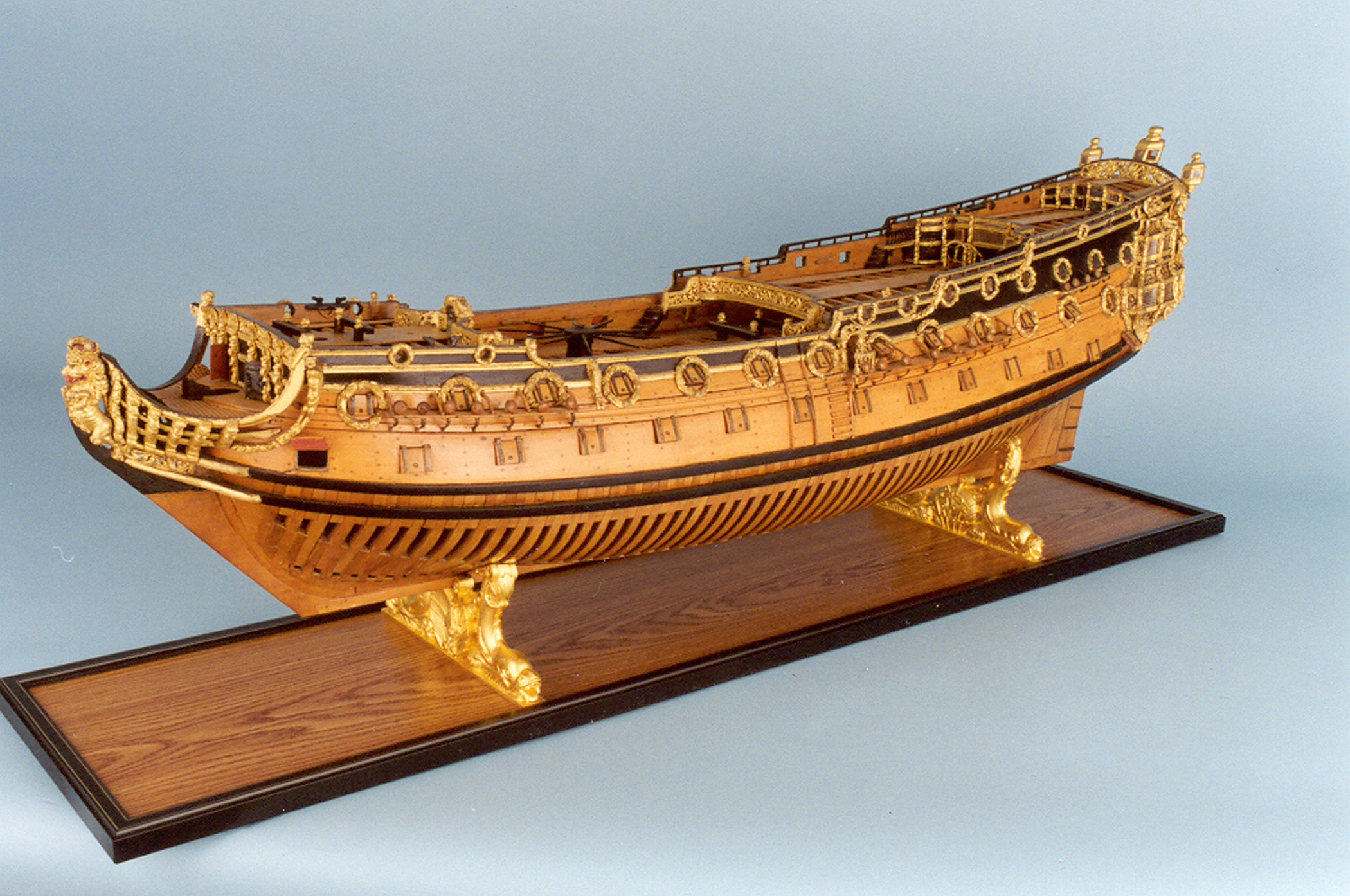
A "plank on frame" model of HMS Sussex on display at the United States Naval Academy Museum

Wooden ship model hulls can be constructed in several ways. The simplest is a solid wood hull sawn and carved from a single block of wood. This method requires the greatest skill to achieve accurate results.

A variant of this technique, sometimes known as bread and butter construction (the wood is the "bread" and glue the "butter") is a hull built up from thin blocks of wood glued together with either a vertical seam which can be incorporated into deck design, or a horizontal seam. This reduces the amount of carving required, but still requires skill and the use of templates to achieve an accurate hull form.

Modelling precision and lightweight design can be achieved by creating a hollow hull. The plank on bulkhead technique inserts a series of shaped bulkheads along the keel to form a shaped stage which will be covered with planks to form the hull of the model. Plank on frame designs build the model just as the full size wooden ship is constructed. The keel is laid down in a manner which keeps it straight and true. The sternpost and stem are erected, deadwood and strengthening pieces inserted, and a series of shaped frames are built and erected along the keel to form the internal framework of the model. The planks are then applied over the frame to form the external covering.

A wooden hull can be used for operating models if properly sealed.

=== Plastic ===
In the decades since World War Two injection-molded polystyrene plastic model ships have become increasingly popular. Consisting of preformed plastic parts which can be bonded together with plastic cement, these models are much simpler to construct than the more labor-intensive traditional wooden models. The inexpensive plastic kits were initially targeted to the postwar generation who could glue them together and produce passable replicas in a single afternoon. Plastic models are available in both full hull and waterline versions for a wide variety of vessels.

A more recent addition has been a variety of kits in cold cure resin marketed by various small companies as part of a cottage industry. These often cover more obscure subjects than mainstream manufacturers.

Scales vary as well, with many kits from the early days being "box scale"; that is, scaled to fit into a uniform sized box designed to fit conveniently on hobby shop shelves. Scales have since become more standardized to enable modelers to construct consistent scale collections, but there are still many to choose from. In Europe 1/400 scale remains popular, while in the United States and Japan the most popular scales are 1/700 (making a World War Two aircraft carrier about a foot long) and 1/350 (twice as long as 1/700). Nevertheless, mainstream plastic kit manufacturers continue to produce kits as small as 1/1200 and as large as 1/72, with a few even larger.

The early plastic model kit producers such as Airfix, Revell, Frog and Pyro have since been joined by Imai, Tamiya, Hasegawa, Skywave/Pit-Road, Trumpeter, Dragon Models Limited and many others in producing a wide array of model subjects. The plastic model kit market has shifted over the years to a focus on adult hobbyists willing to pay for more elaborate, higher quality kits.

Another recent development has been the advent of aftermarket parts to enhance the basic kits. Decals, specialized paints and turned metal replacement gun barrels are available to make plastic models more accurate. The introduction of flat photoetched metal sets, usually stainless steel or brass, also provide much more realistic lifelines, cranes, and other details than are possible with the injection molded plastic kits. These photoetch sets have transformed the hobby, enabling the finescale modeler to reproduce very delicate details with much less effort.

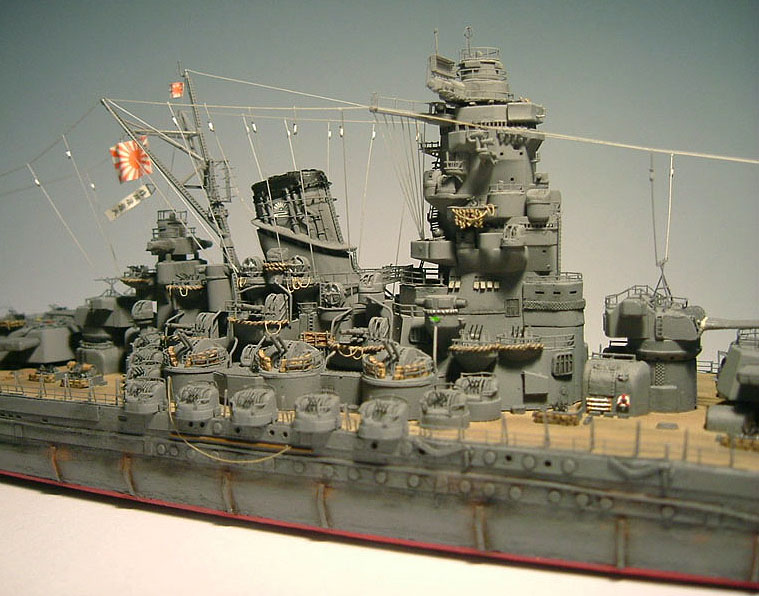
Details of 1/700 scale model of the Japanese battleship Yamato, which is heavily detailed with aftermarket photo-etch detailing parts.

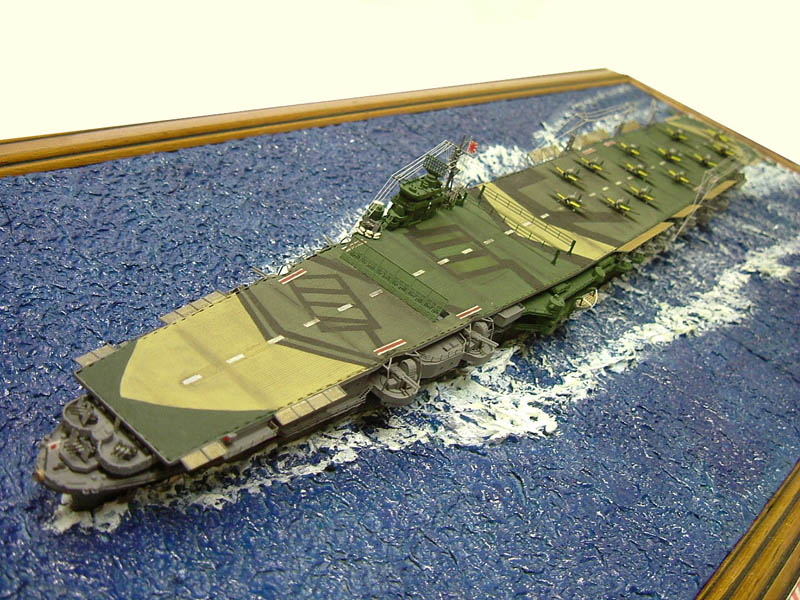
A Tamiya 1/700 scale assembled model of Japanese Aircraft-Carrier Zuikaku completed with aftermarket photoetch accessories.

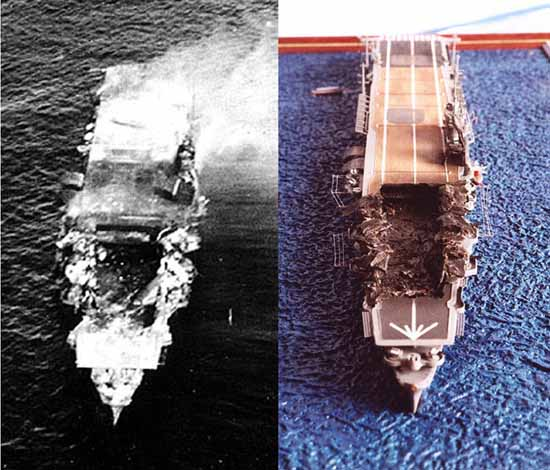
A converted 1/700 scale model of Japanese aircraft carrier Hiryū based on the photo of her before sinking during the Battle of Midway.

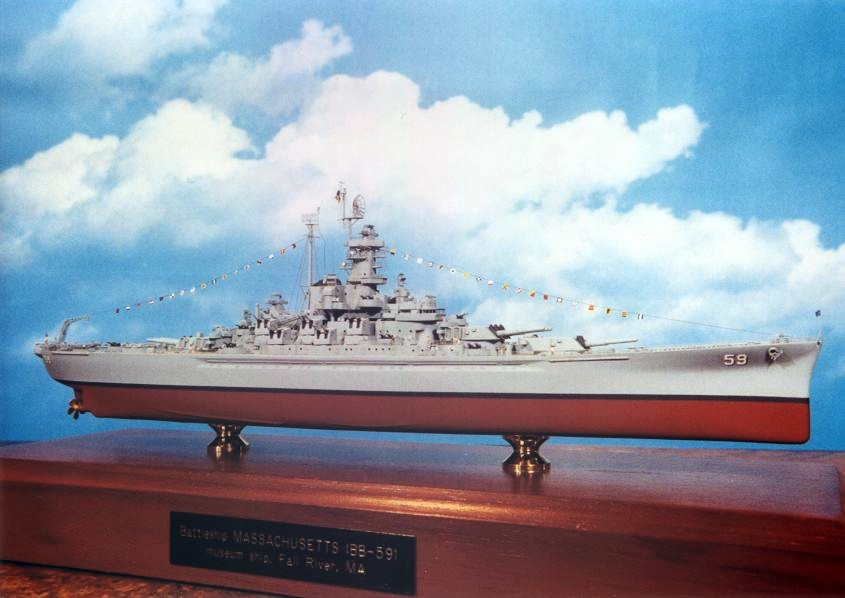
1/720 scale plastic model of the USS Massachusetts (BB-59).

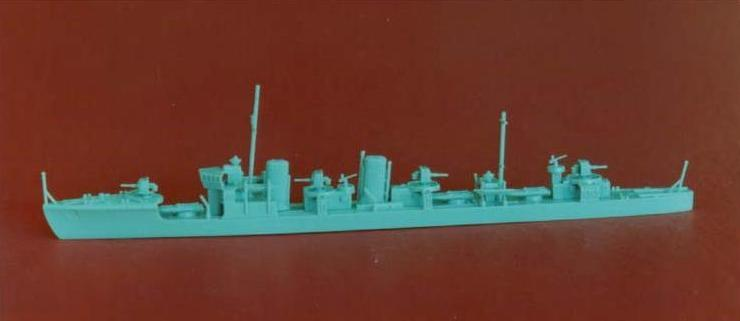
An assembled 1:700 scale Skywave/Pit-Road Japanese destroyer is about the size of a pencil.

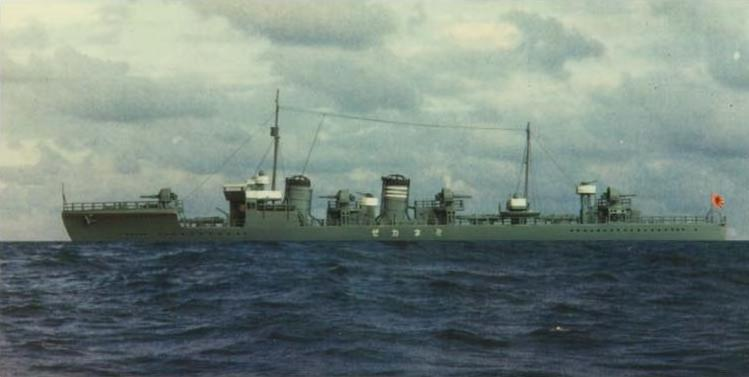
1:700 scale plastic model completed with photoetch brass rails and other refinements.

=== Live steam ===
Enthusiasts build live steam model ships of many types and in many scales. These range from simple pop pop boats to models of racing hydroplanes.

== Scale conversion factors ==
Table of Scale Conversion Factors
from	to 1/8	to 3/16	to 1/4
1/16	2.0	3.0	4.0
1/12	1.5	2.25	3.0
3/32	1.33	2.0	2.67
1/8	1.0	1.5	2.0
5/32	0.8	1.2	1.6
3/16	0.67	1.0	1.33
1.5	0.625	0.94	1.25
7/32	0.57	0.86	1.14
1/4	0.5	0.75	1.0

Instead of using plans made specifically for models, many model shipwrights use the actual blueprints for the original vessel. One can take drawings for the original ship to a blueprint service and have them blown up, or reduced to bring them to the new scale. For instance, if the drawings are in 1/4" scale and you intend to build in 3/16", tell the service to reduce them 25%. You can use the conversion table below to determine the percentage of change. You can easily work directly from the original drawings however, by changing scale each time you make a measurement.

The equation for converting a measurement in one scale to that of another scale is D2 = D1 x F where:

- D1 = Dimension in the "from-scale"
- D2 = Dimension in the "to-scale"
- F = Conversion factor between scales

Example: A yardarm is 6" long in 3/16" scale. Find its length in 1/8" scale.

- F = .67 (from table)
- D2 = 6" X .67 = 4.02 = 4"

It is easier to make measurements in the metric system and then multiply them by the scale conversion factor. Scales are expressed in fractional inches, but fractions themselves are harder to work with than metric measurements. For example, a hatch measures 1" wide on the draft. You are building in 3/16" scale. Measuring the hatch in metric, you measure 25 mm. T he conversion factor for 1/4" to 3/16', according to the conversion table is .75. So 25 mm x .75 = 18.75 mm, or about 19 mm. That is the hatch size in 3/16" scale.

Conversion is a fairly simple task once you start measuring in metric and converting according to the scale.

There is a simple conversion factor that allows you to determine the approximate size of a model by taking the actual measurements of the full-size ship and arriving at a scale factor. It is a rough way of deciding whether you want to build a model that is about two feet long, three feet long, or four feet long.

Here is a ship model conversion example using a real ship, the Hancock. This is a frigate appearing in Chappelle's "History of American Sailing Ships". In this example we want to estimate its size as a model. We find that the length is given at 136' 7", which rounds off to 137 feet.

1/8 scale	Feet divided by 8
3/16 scale	Feet divided by 5.33
1/4 scale	Feet divided by 4

To convert feet (of the actual ship) to the number of inches long that the model will be, use the factors in the table on the right.

To find the principal dimensions (length, height, and width) of a (square rigged) model in 1/8" scale, then:

1. Find scaled length by dividing 137 by 8 = 17.125"
2. Find 50% of 17.125 and add it to 17.125 (8.56 + 17.125 = 25.685, about 25.5)
3. Typically, the height of this model will be its length less 10% or about 23.1/2"
4. Typically, the beam of this model will be its length divided by 4, or about 6 1/2"

Although this technique allows you to judge the approximate length of a proposed model from its true footage, only square riggers will fit the approximate height and beam by the above factors. To approximate these dimensions on other craft, scale the drawings from which you found the length and arrive at her mast heights and beam.

== Wargaming ==
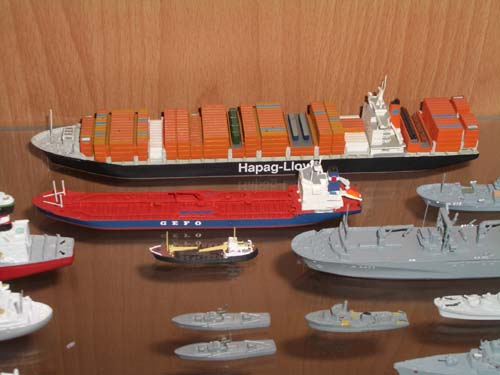
1:1250 scale die-cast models of ships

Model ships have been used for war gaming since antiquity, but the introduction of elaborate rules made the practice more popular in the early 20th century. Small miniature ships, often in 1:1200 scale and 1:1250 scale were maneuvered on large playing surfaces to either recreate a historical battle, or in the case of governments, plan for future encounters. These models were basic representations of ship types, with enough detail to make them recognizable. Bassett-Lowke marketed these to the public in England, along with more detailed versions that appealed to collectors.

Prior to World War II, the German company Wiking became a leader in the field but the war ended its dominance.

Upon the United States' entry into World War II, Charles King Van Riper was commissioned to build identification models at a scale of 1 ft (0.30 m) to 64 ft (20 m). He produced 1:1200 models of freighters for the United States Navy's Submarine Attack Teacher at Groton, Connecticut.

== Large scale ==
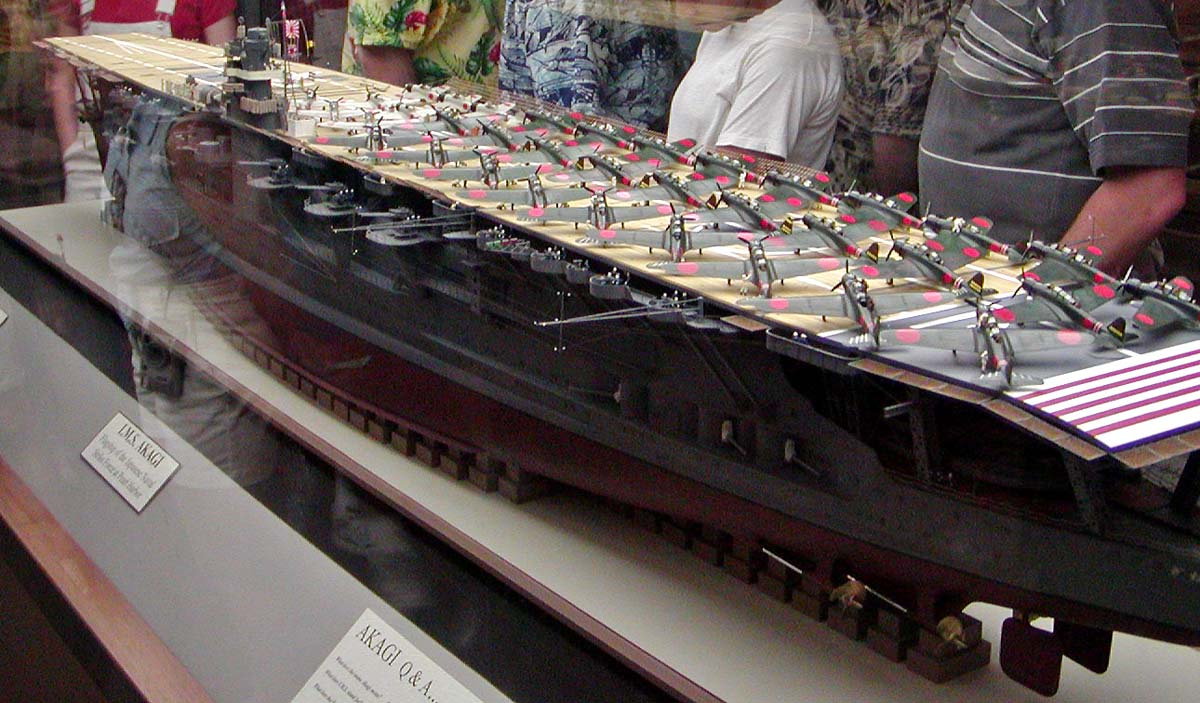
Large commercial model of the IJN Akagi on display at Pearl Harbor

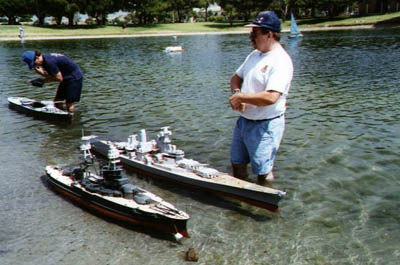
Large scale model warships in San Diego

Larger ship models have been used in museums to document historical ships, in companies for decoration and public relations. These are typically built by commercial firms, or, in the past, model departments of large shipyards. One famous builder of ship models for the United States Navy was the firm of Gibbs & Cox; a 1/48 scale model of the USS Missouri, which is on display at the Washington Navy Yard museum, required an estimated 77,000 man hours to construct. Commercial ship models are usually built to rigorous standards; for example the US Navy has an exacting set of specifications regarding the use of materials and methods with the aim of ensuring a model "lifespan" of one hundred years.

=== Radio control ===
Some hobbyists build and operate scale model ships utilizing radio control equipment. These can range from small models that can be operated in aquariums to vessels capable of navigating large bodies of water. Further expanding the concept is model warship combat, in which scale models fire projectiles at each other in combat.

== Engineering models ==
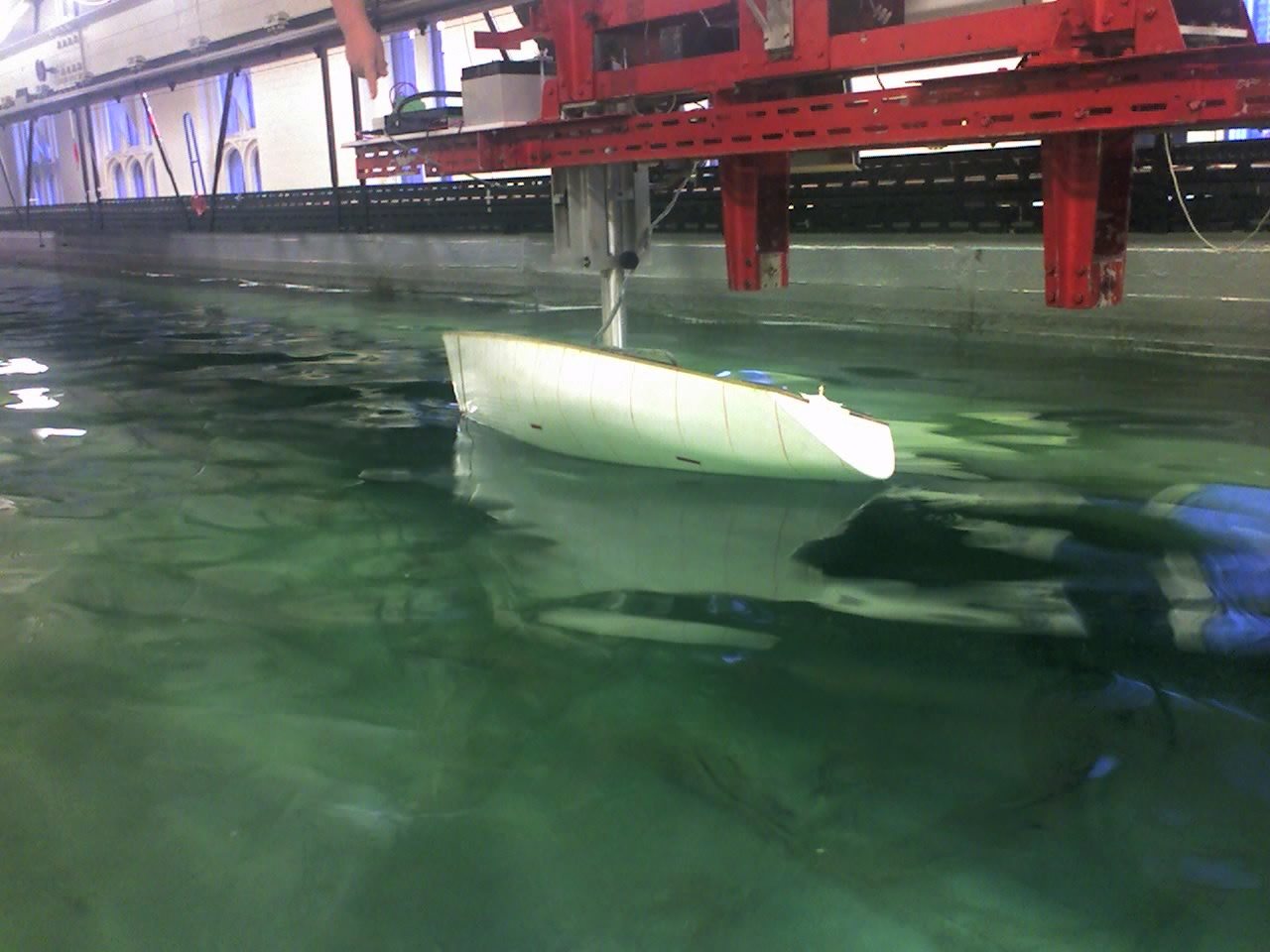
Test model in a towing tank

Model ships are important in the field of engineering, where analytical modeling of a new design needs to be verified. Principals of similitude are used to apply measured data from a scaled model to the full scale design. Models are often tested in special facilities known as model basins.

== Manned ==
Manned models are model ships that can carry and be handled by at least one person on an open expanse of water. They must behave just like real ships, giving the shiphandler the same sensations. Physical conditions such as wind, currents, waves, water depths, channels and berths must be reproduced realistically.

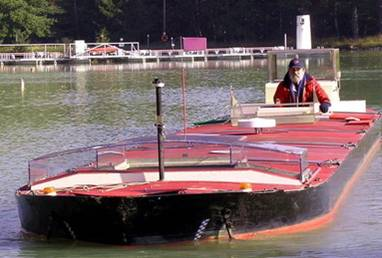
Manned model of a 250 000 dwt tanker

Manned models are used for research (e.g. ship behaviour), engineering (e.g. port layout) and for training in shiphandling (e.g. maritime pilots, masters and officers). They are usually at 1:25 scale.

The aim of training on manned models is to enable seamen to acquire or to develop manoeuvring skills through a better understanding of a ship's behaviour as it sails in restricted water conditions at manoeuvring speed. Manned models are considered by maritime pilots as the next best thing to a full-scale prototype for understanding a ship's behaviour. Those who have trained on both claim that scale models are complementary to computer simulators. While manoeuvres with currents, waves, tugs, anchors, bank effects, etc. are reproduced more accurately on scale models, numerical simulators are more realistic when it comes to the bridge environment.

The Port Revel Shiphandling Training Centre is a French maritime pilotage school specializing in training for pilots, masters, and officers on large ships like supertankers, container ships, LNG carriers and cruise ships. The facility uses manned models at a 1:25 scale on a man-made lake designed to simulate natural conditions in harbours, canals, and open seas. It was the first such facility in the world. The centre was originally created in 1967 near Grenoble by Laboratoire Dauphinois d'Hydraulique.

== Yachts ==
Model yachts are operating craft, which may be sail, steam, engine or electric motor powered, typically resembling pleasure power craft, although the hobby also includes the construction and operation of models of working ships such as tugboats and other craft shown in this article as static models.

== Model shipwright guilds ==
Model shipwright guilds tend to concentrate their efforts on highly accurate static models of all types of watercraft and are social groupings intended to allow more experienced ship modellers the opportunity to pass on their knowledge to new members; to allow members of all levels of expertise to exchange new ideas, as well as serving as social function.

Some model shipwright guilds are incorporated into government and Naval facilities, achieving a semi-official status as a clearinghouse for information on naval history, ship design and, at times, teaching the craft of ship modeling, through model building, restoration, repair of the facility's models, as well as, museum docent services. The USS Constitution Museum operates a model shipwright guild from the Charlestown Navy Yard adjacent to the berth for the vessel itself, as does the San Francisco Maritime National Historical Park by sponsoring the Hyde Street Pier Model Shipwrights and providing work and meeting to them aboard space aboard the ferryboat Eureka tied at the Hyde Street Pier where they are considered working museum volunteers.

== Collections ==
The largest collection of ship models is thought to be the collection at the National Maritime Museum, Greenwich, which numbers nearly 5,000, most of which are held in the Model Store at the No. 1 Smithery at the Historic Dockyard Chatham, Kent.

In private hands two of the largest collections belong to the hobbyists who made them. Philip Warren of England has a collection of 432 ship models built on the scale of 1:300, all of which he constructed himself. Erick Navas of Peru has a collection of 1005 warships, some of which he built from scratch.

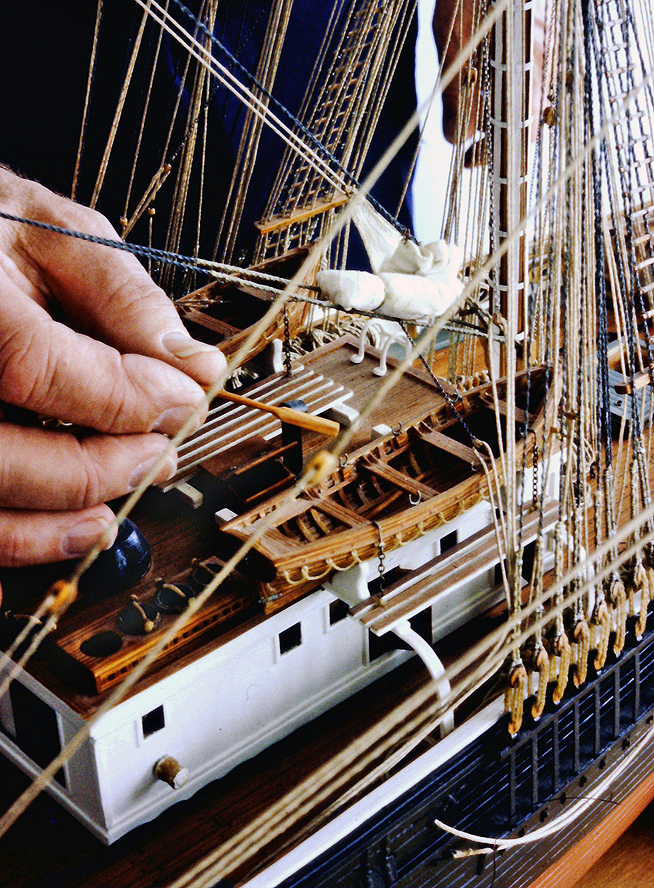
Detail of a full-rigger

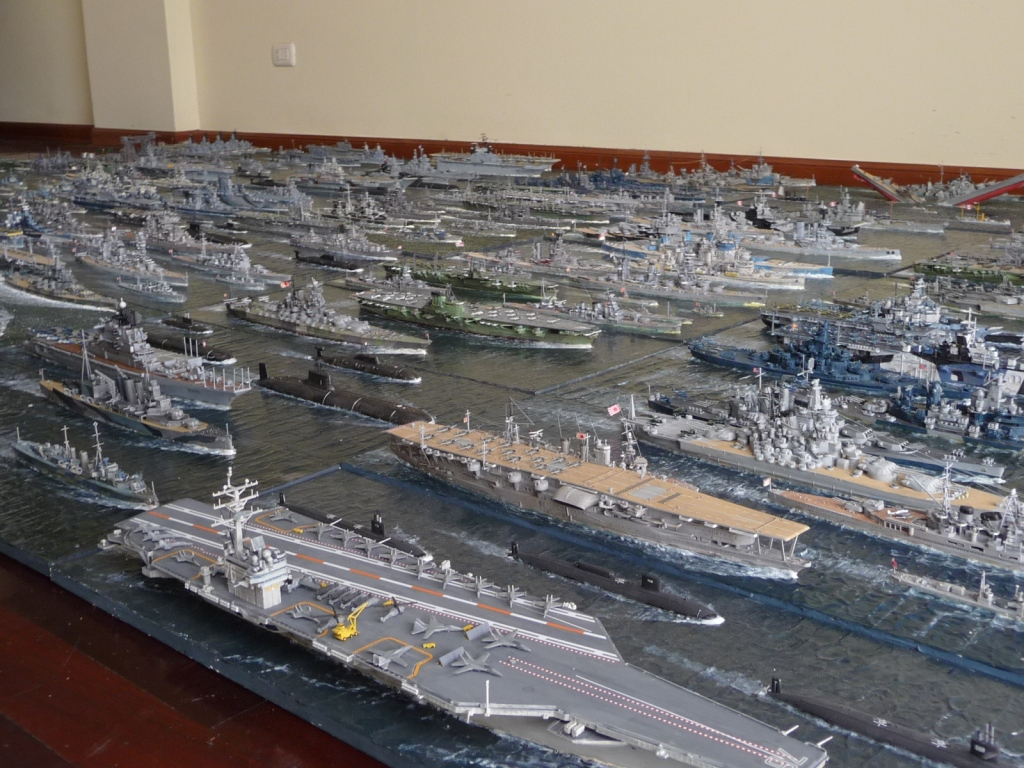
Erick Navas collection

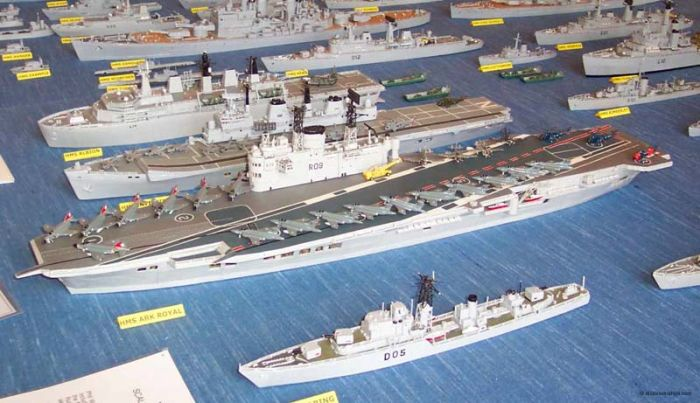
Philip Warren collection

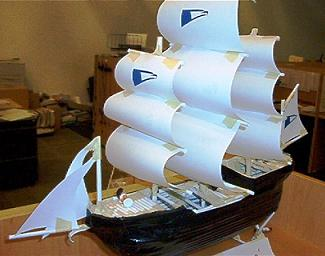
Model ship made with non-traditional materials: rolled-up tubes of paper, Express Mail labels, and duct tape.

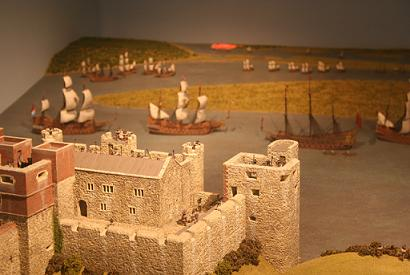
Model ships in a model town

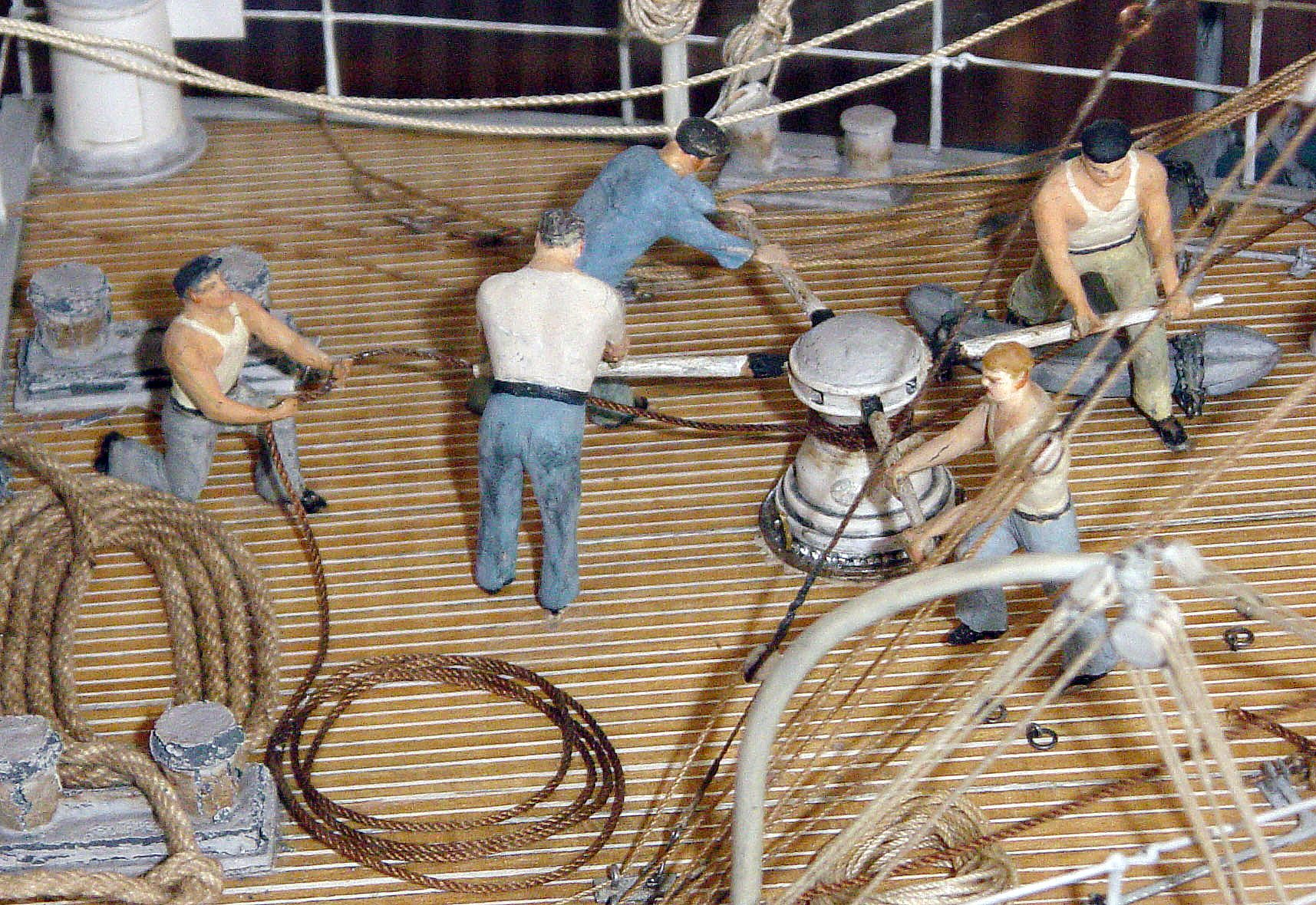
Detail of a model that shows men operating a capstan

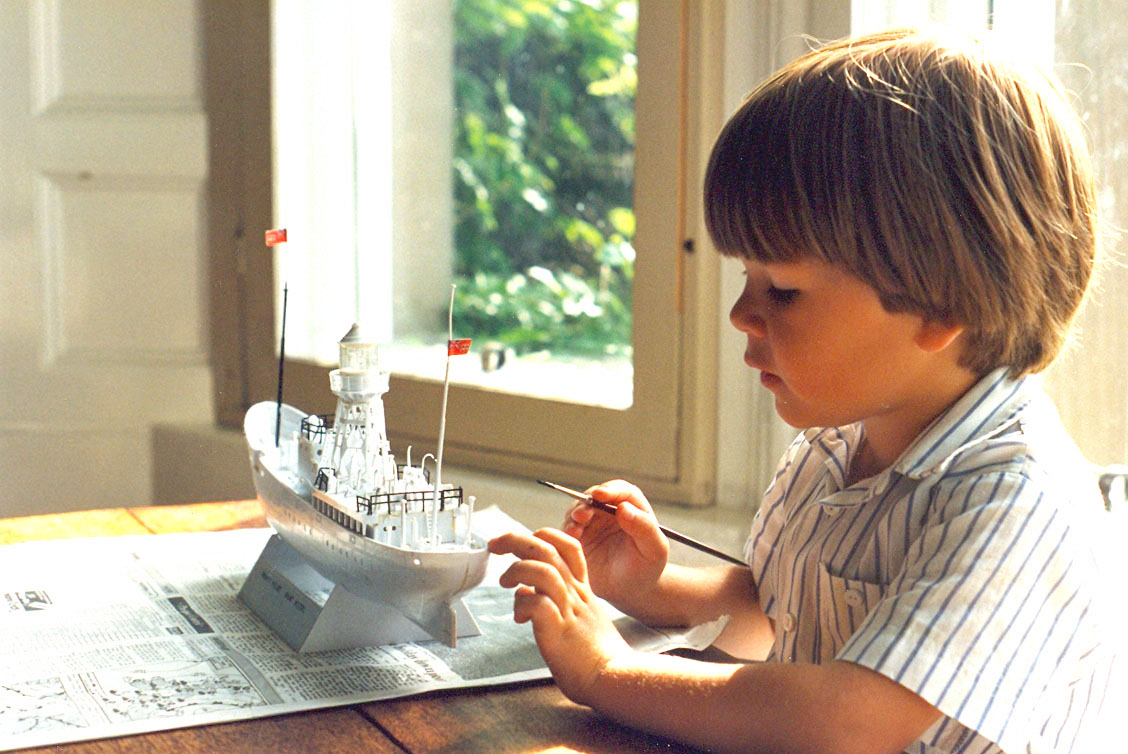
4-year-old boy painting a Revell plastic model of the South Goodwin Lightship

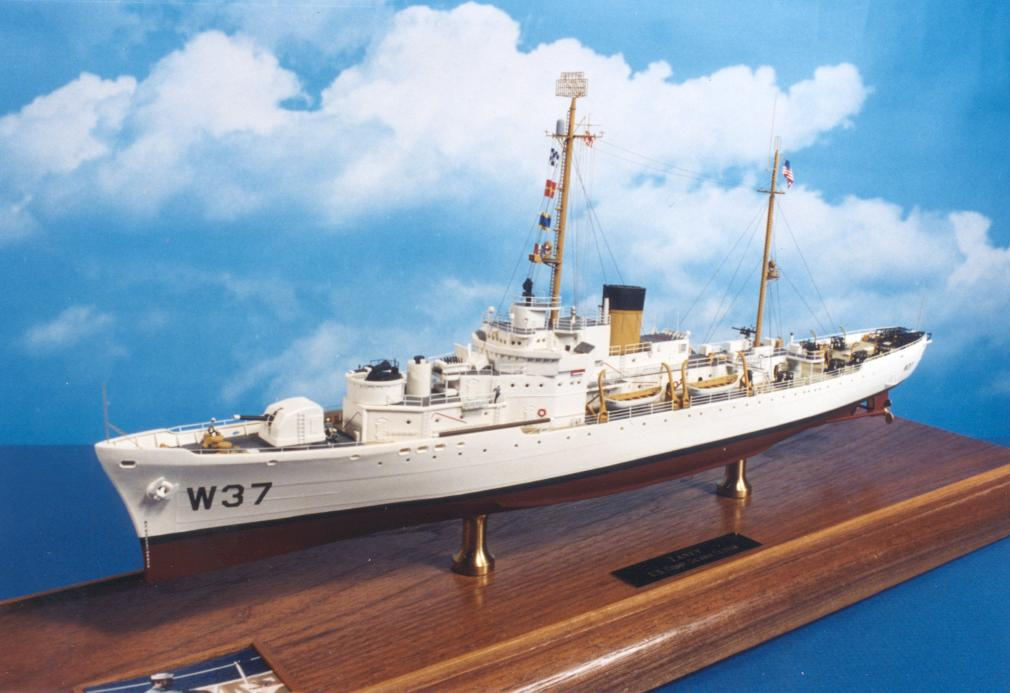
Completed Revell USCGC Taney (WHEC-37) model. Originally issued in 1956, it was among the earliest injection molded plastic ship model kits.

== See also ==
- Model airplane
- Model yachting
- Model warship combat
- Radio-controlled boat
- Wooden Ship Models
