= Oshikatsu =

Japanese fandom subculture

Oshikatsu (推し活; lit. "lifestyle supporting a favorite") is a Japanese fandom subculture popular among young people, especially young women, in which a person spends significant amounts of time and money to support an idol or favorite character, primarily as a form of fan identity. It gained popularity during the COVID-19 pandemic and has been compared to Western stan culture. The subculture and its activities have been criticized for enabling addiction and unhealthy spending, while businesses and economists see the trend as a potential avenue to revitalize Japan's economy.

== Definition ==
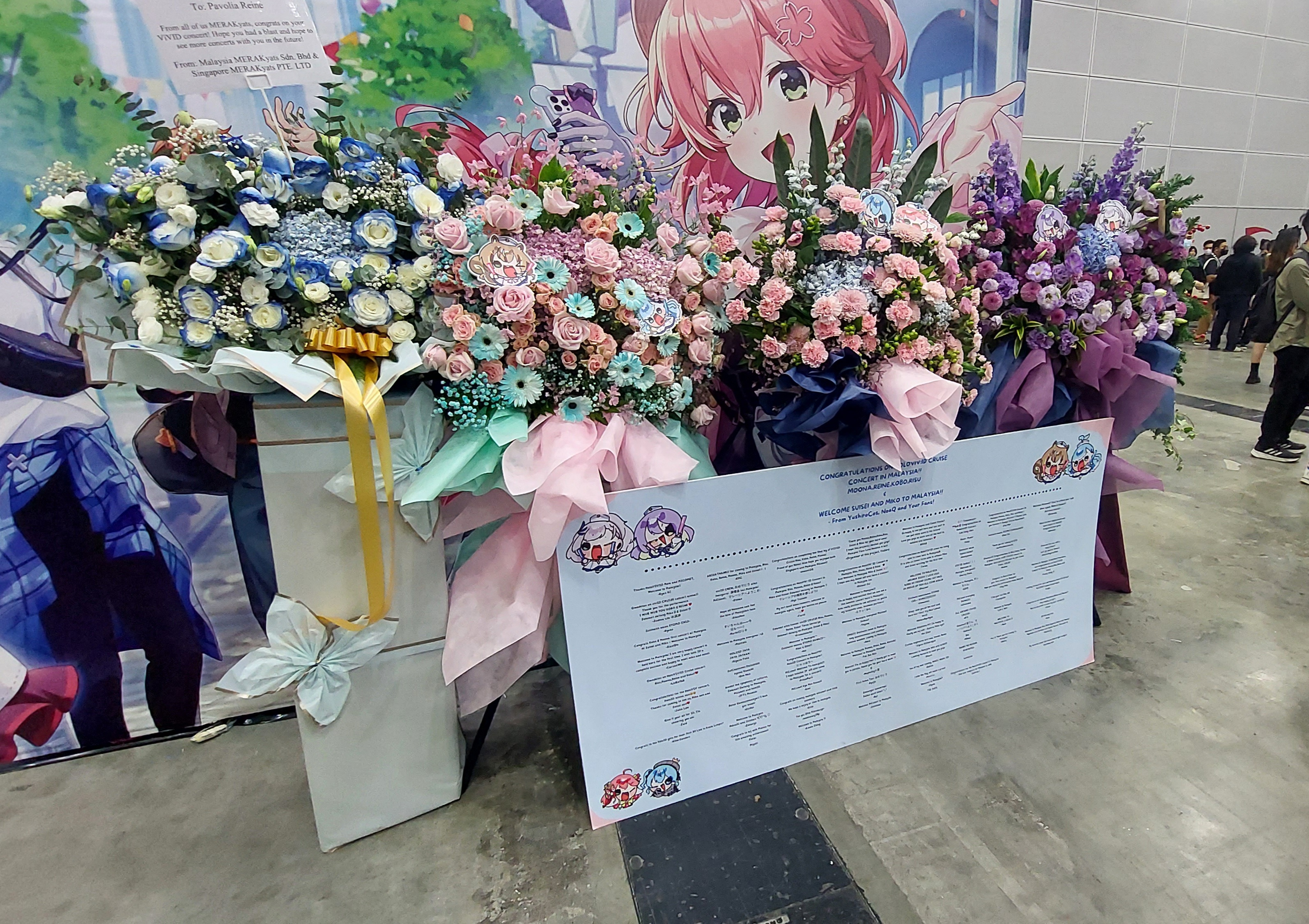
Flowers left as gifts for members of the VTuber agency Hololive Production.

The term oshikatsu is derived from the slang term oshi (推し), meaning "favorite" or "someone one supports", and katsu (活), meaning "activity". One's oshi can be anything, but are most commonly Japanese and Korean idols, anime and video game characters, actors, YouTubers (especially VTubers), and even porn stars. Oshikatsu activities are seen as a way to show support or love to one's oshi, often financially. Oshikatsu has been compared to the Western phenomenon of stan culture.

Those who participate in oshikatsu find it fulfilling to support someone they love, and believe the activities help to relieve stress. It is also seen as a way to establish one's identity within a fandom, with introduction posts on social networks often starting by listing the poster's oshi. Another key aspect of oshikatsu is spreading one's oshi to others in order to increase their popularity.

== Demographics ==
A 2024 survey from VideoResearch found that of their 4000 respondents, 62.1% of Generation Z, 40.4% of Millennials, and 27.1% of Generation X considered themselves to have an oshi. Generation X respondents were more likely to identify a musician as their oshi, while Millennials and Generation Z individuals most commonly named an idol, with fictional characters coming in second. YouTubers and VTubers were only mentioned by Generation Z respondents. A study from Intage Inc. found that women were more likely to have an oshi, and younger groups had a higher percentage between both men and women. A nationwide survey from A3 Inc. reported that one in three of their roughly 28 million respondents said they had an oshi.

== History ==
The roots of oshikatsu can be traced as far back as the 1980s with the initial rise of Japanese idol culture. The term "oshi" is said to have originated as slang from fans of idol groups, primarily spreading through Morning Musume fans on the anonymous message board 2channel. In another idol group, AKB48, fans could vote on which idols they wanted to see at the forefront of the group's next single, which came to be known as osu (推す), meaning to recommend. In 2010, AKB48 would release "Team B Oshi", which would further popularize the term.

Around the same time in anime fandom, some otaku men had sworn off real-life dating in favor of fictional characters from anime and visual novels. One man named Akihiko Kondo made headlines for marrying virtual idol Hatsune Miku.

The term oshikatsu itself first appeared online in 2016, and began to pick up in popularity on Twitter by 2018. The subculture began to grow significantly during the COVID-19 pandemic as a form of escapism. The 2020 novel Oshi, Moyu has been attributed as having contributed to the subculture's rise in prominence. In 2021, the term was nominated for Japan's word of the year. A 2022 survey conducted by JR East Marketing & Communications found that 57.4% of the 17 thousand people between the ages of 15 and 45 they interviewed said they had an oshi.

As of 2024, the subculture is no longer primarily limited to young people, as a survey done by Harumeku found that 46% of female respondents in their 50s had an oshi that they financially supported in some capacity.

== Culture ==
Oshikatsu activities include attending concerts, drawing fan art and writing fan fiction. Fans in the subculture are also known for purchasing large amounts of merchandise of their oshi, ranging from media like CDs to collectibles such as posters, and acrylic stands. Items used to cheer idols on during concerts such as pen lights and flags are also popular within the subculture. Some fans may even take "pilgrimages" to so-called "sacred sites" (locations associated with their oshi), or wear clothing in colors associated with their oshi. An article for Reuters notes one woman who spent money to sit at the same cafe table that her favorite boy band had sat at, decorating the table with acrylic stands of her favorite member.

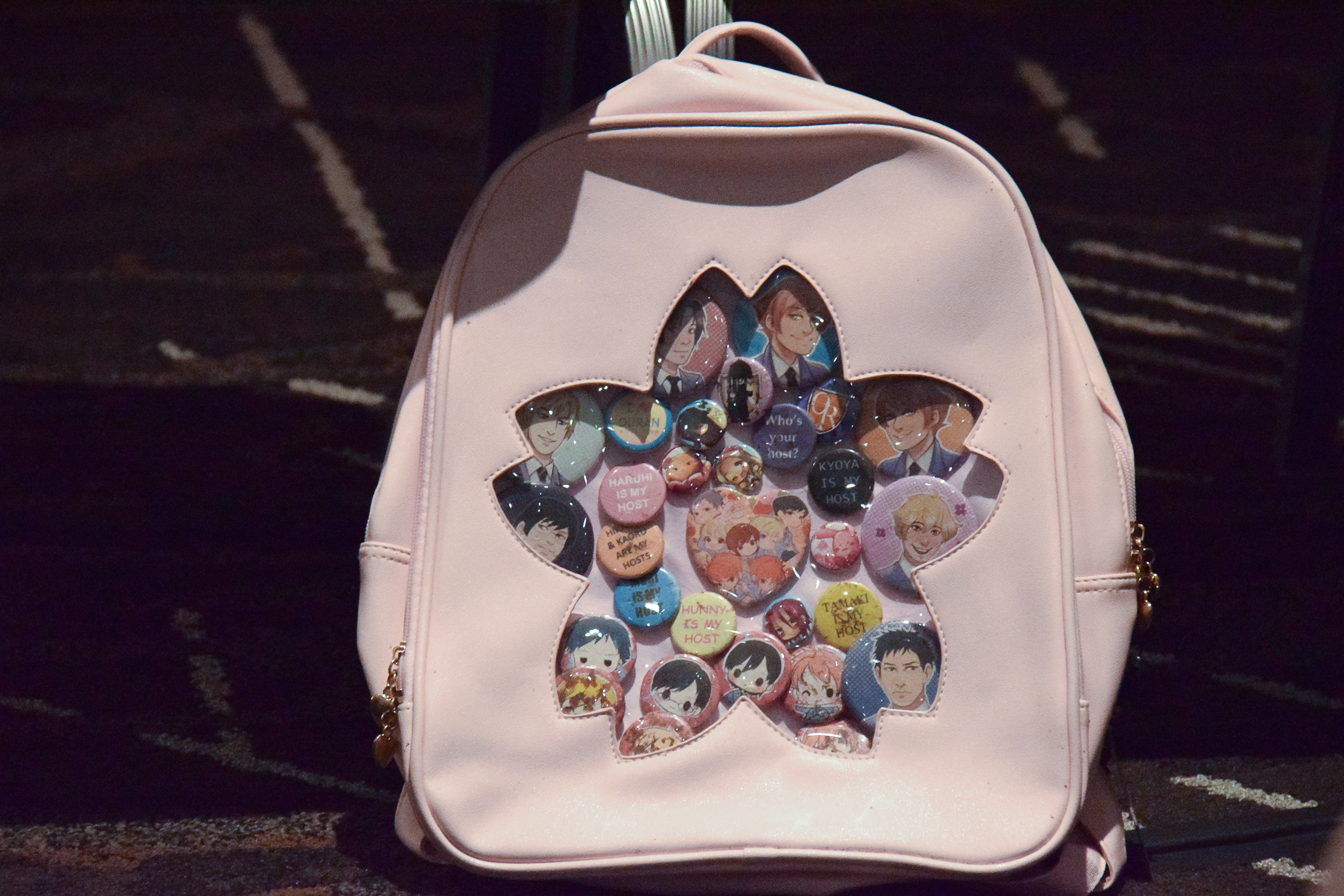
An ita-bag featuring badges of Ouran High School Host Club characters.

Ita-bag creation is a large part of oshikatsu culture, though the activity predates the trend. These bags are often expensive to make, being covered in merchandise of the wearer's oshi. Ita-bags most often have a clear window for displaying pin-back buttons, plush dolls, keychains, and other goods.

Writing for The Conversation, Fabio Gygi remarks that oshikatsu is in some ways a reversal of Japanese gender norms, in that husbands are typically expected to provide for the household – while in oshikatsu, women are often financially supporting their favorite male celebrity. Oshikatsu is viewed positively by both members of the subculture, for the mental self-care it provides, and marketers, for the emotional commitments it fosters. It also has a more positive view from the general public, as opposed to previous viewpoints of otaku, who are stereotyped as single men who socially isolate themselves. Studies on the relationship between the term "oshikatsu" and views towards otaku have shown an increase in positive viewpoints.

== Economic impact ==
After the COVID-19 pandemic, inflation caused Japanese consumers to cut back on their spending, and additionally, wages are rising. The government and corporate entities have turned their attention towards media and entertainment to rekindle economic growth in the country, with oshikatsu receiving significant attention as a potential driving force. According to Kohei Okazaki, an analyst for Nomura Securities, "the 20-somethings, who'll probably receive another big pay rise in this spring's wage talks, are more proactive about oshikatsu than other age groups", going on to theorize that the spending of said age group would increase during 2025.

A survey from Japanese marketing firm CDG and Oshicoco, a company who specializes in oshikatsu-related products, showed that fans spent an average of ¥250,000 on their oshi each year, and estimated that 14 million people, or 11% of Japan's total population, engage in oshikatsu as of 2025. Overall, this amounts to around 3.5 trillion yen spent on oshikatsu-related products yearly in Japan as a whole, accounting for 2.1% of Japan's annual retail sales.

== Criticism ==
The oshikatsu subculture has been criticized for encouraging unhealthy spending and the formation of addictions. A survey in the magazine Toyo Keizai found that 50% of its respondents in their 20s, and 40% of respondents in their 30s and 40s, believed oshikatsu to be a financial burden on their life. Hakuhodo's Oshinomics report found that teenage girls reported having spent half of their disposable income on their oshi, with said oshi most commonly being underground male idols, hosts, or employees at concept cafes. Kotaro Nishimura, a Japanese psychiatrist who specializes in addiction, says that oshikatsu is a form of relationship addiction that can be just as real as a gambling or alcohol addiction.

Concept cafes and host clubs that encourage oshikatsu behavior are criticized for exploiting fan loyalty. Waka Ikeda of The Japan Times notes that at some men's concept cafes, customers are pressured into spending large amounts of money on things such as photo opportunities and merchandise. In Kodaka Maiko's paper Embrace Me As I Am, she homes in on how female loneliness in Japan is exploited by things such as private "dating" services. She also notes, however, that "winning the love" of their oshi is not these fans' end goal, rather, they view oshikatsu as a means to fulfill self-realization – supporting one's oshi being taken on as a self identity.

== See also ==
- Dōtan kyohi
