= 1:700 scale =

Scale for model ship kits

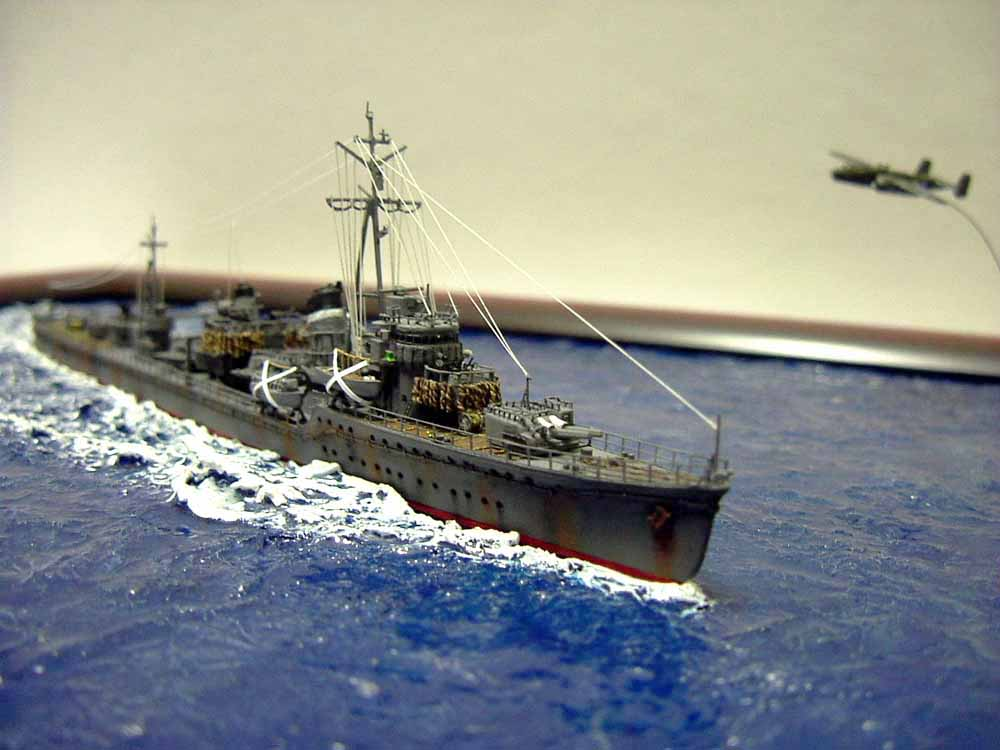
1/700 scale Japanese destroyer Harusame (1935) with a B-25 in the background plastic model kit released by Tamiya

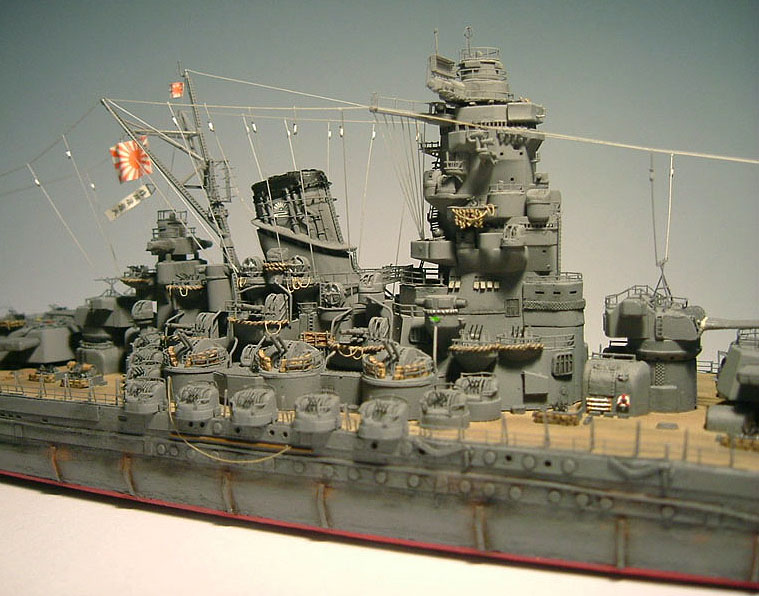
1/700 scale Japanese battleship Yamato plastic model kit released by Tamiya. Model is heavily detailed with aftermarket photo-etch detailing parts.

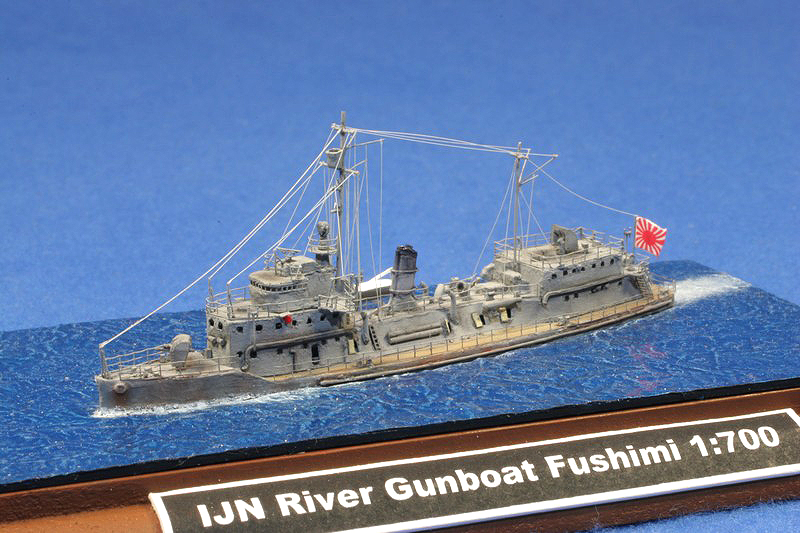
A 7cm long scratch-built model of the Japanese gunboat Fushimi (1939) built to 1/700 scale.

1:700 scale is a widely popular scale mainly used by Japanese ship model kit manufacturers, such as Aoshima, Tamiya, Hasegawa, Fujimi and Pit-Road.

== History ==
Manufacturers such as Airfix, Renwal, and Heller were producing ship models in various scales, ranging from 1/400 to 1/600 scale. Airfix began producing constant scale 20th century warship subjects to 1/600 scale in 1959. In 1967, Revell began to produce ship kits in a unified 1/720 scale, and Italeri followed Revell ten years after. In 1971, Japanese manufacturers started to produce a series of 1/700 scale water line ship kits. In this scale, approximately 1 inch equals 60 scale feet. This series steadily expanded over the years. At the beginning, only ships of the Japanese Navy were available in the series, but later American, British and German navy subjects were also included. Between 1977 and 1979, Matchbox released a small number of British, German and US waterline ship kits, they were designed to be made of different colors of plastic so that painting was not required.

Due to the large range of water line kits available in this scale, it became popular and now widely considered as a 'standardized scale' in ship modelling. Today there are many companies outside Japan producing 1/700 scale ships as well, such as the Chinese companies Trumpeter and Dragon Models. Various aftermarket photo-etched detailing parts are also widely available for adding fine details to ship models.

There are also small-run manufacturers of 1/700 scale warships, particularly with respect to ships that were designed but never built (Imperial Hobbies) and the leading resin kit manufacturer Kombrig which deals with many vessels of the predreadnought, dreadnought and WW2 eras which would not otherwise see manufacturing.

== Water Line Series ==
The Water Line Series was created by the Shizuoka Plastic Model Manufacturers Association in May 1971. It is a collaborative effort by three manufacturers to produce constant scale models of most of the ships of the Imperial Japanese Navy during World War II, in their first series, and then an ongoing collection of 1/700-scale kits of warships of the world. It started with four manufacturers (Tamiya, Aoshima, Hasegawa and Fujimi), but Fujimi separated in 1992 and made their own line named Sea Way Model Series. As the series name suggests, the models are produced only with the portion visible above the water, that enable them to be displayed as though they were at sea. Today there are over 180 products in the series, most of them ships from various World War II navies.

== See also ==
- Scale model
- Ship model
- List of scale model sizes
