= Itasha =

Vehicle decorated with images of fictional characters

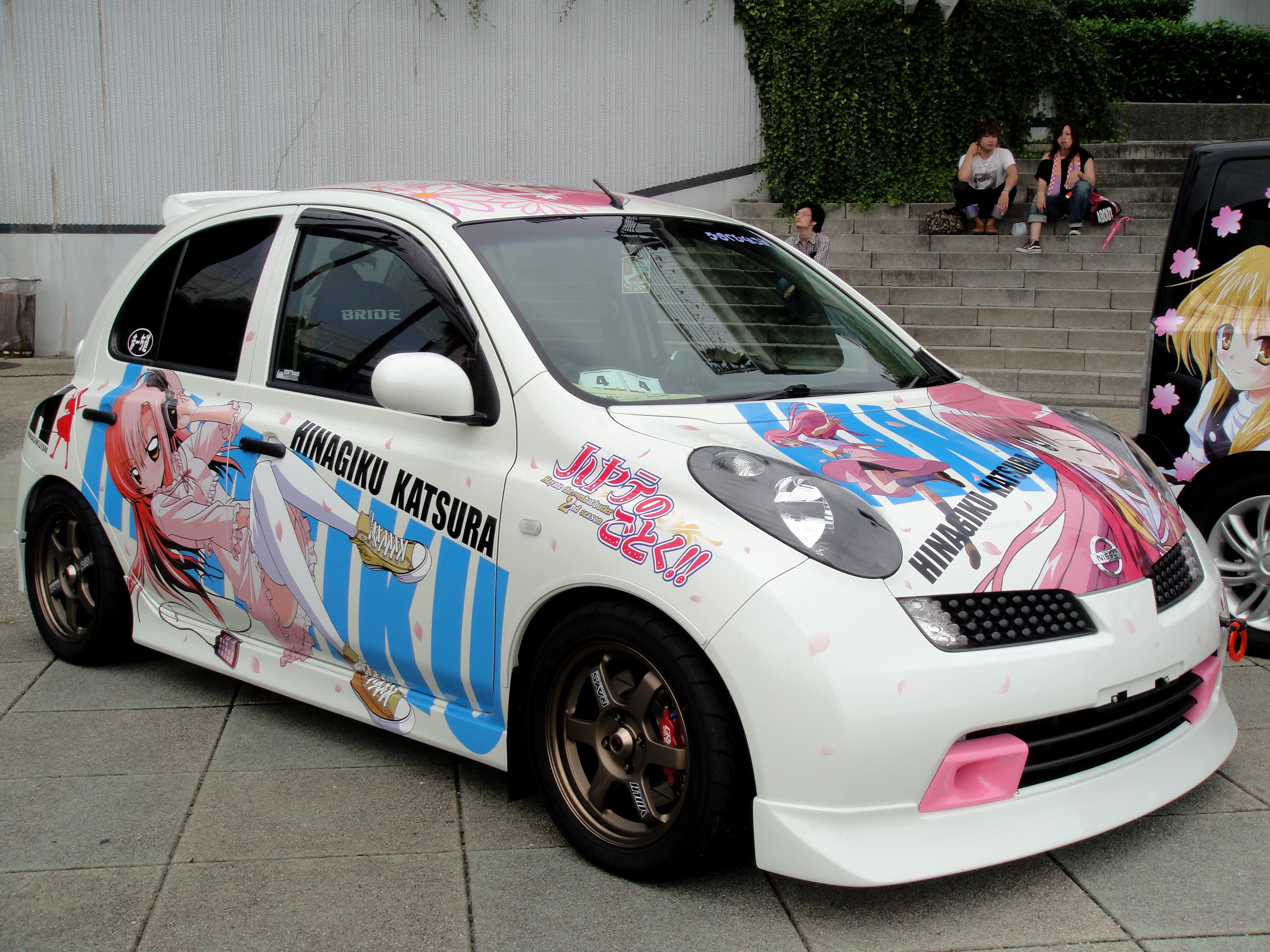
A Nissan Micra featuring Hinagiku Katsura from the manga series Hayate the Combat Butler

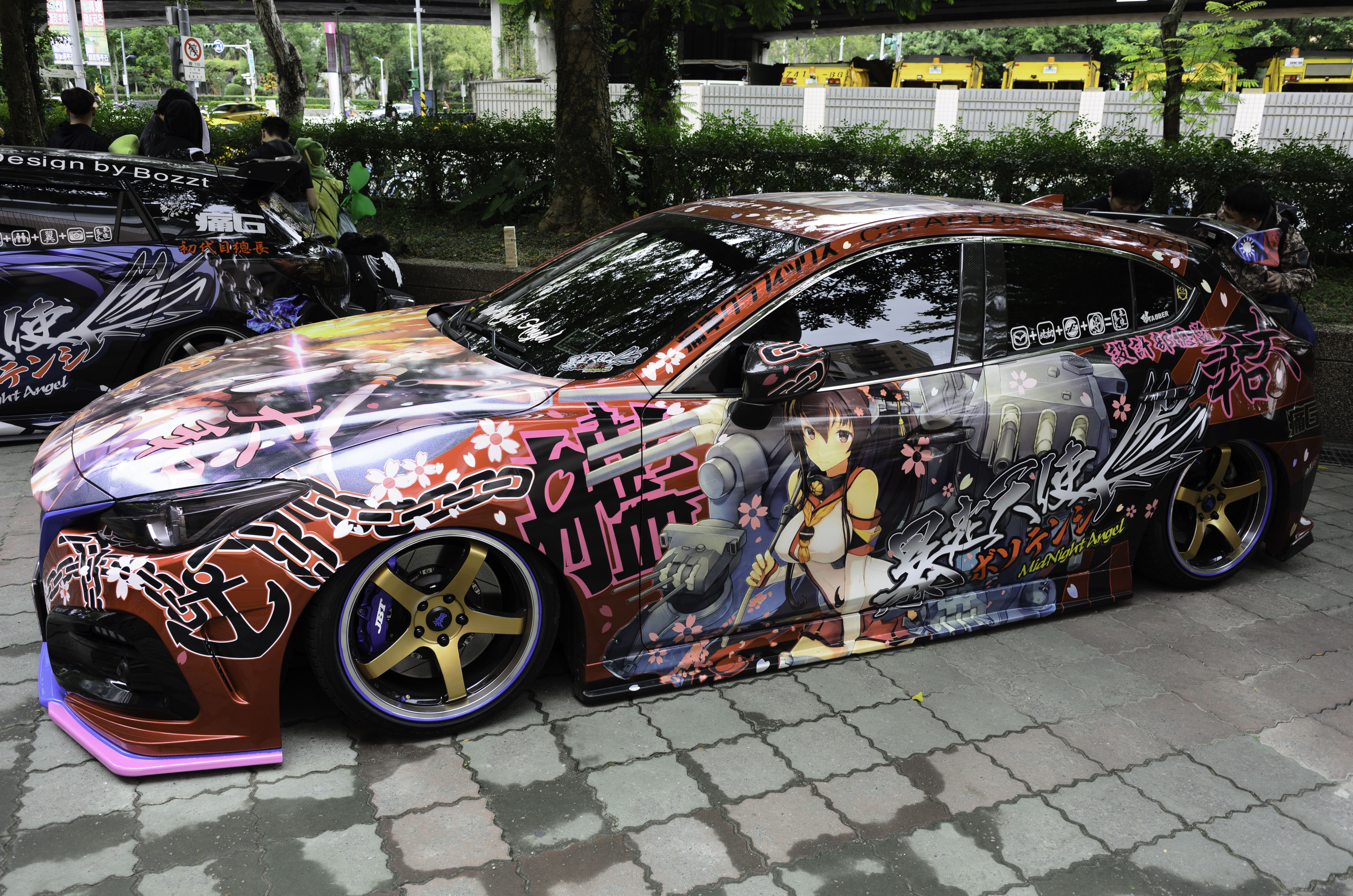
A Mazda 3 featuring Yamato from the video game Kantai Collection

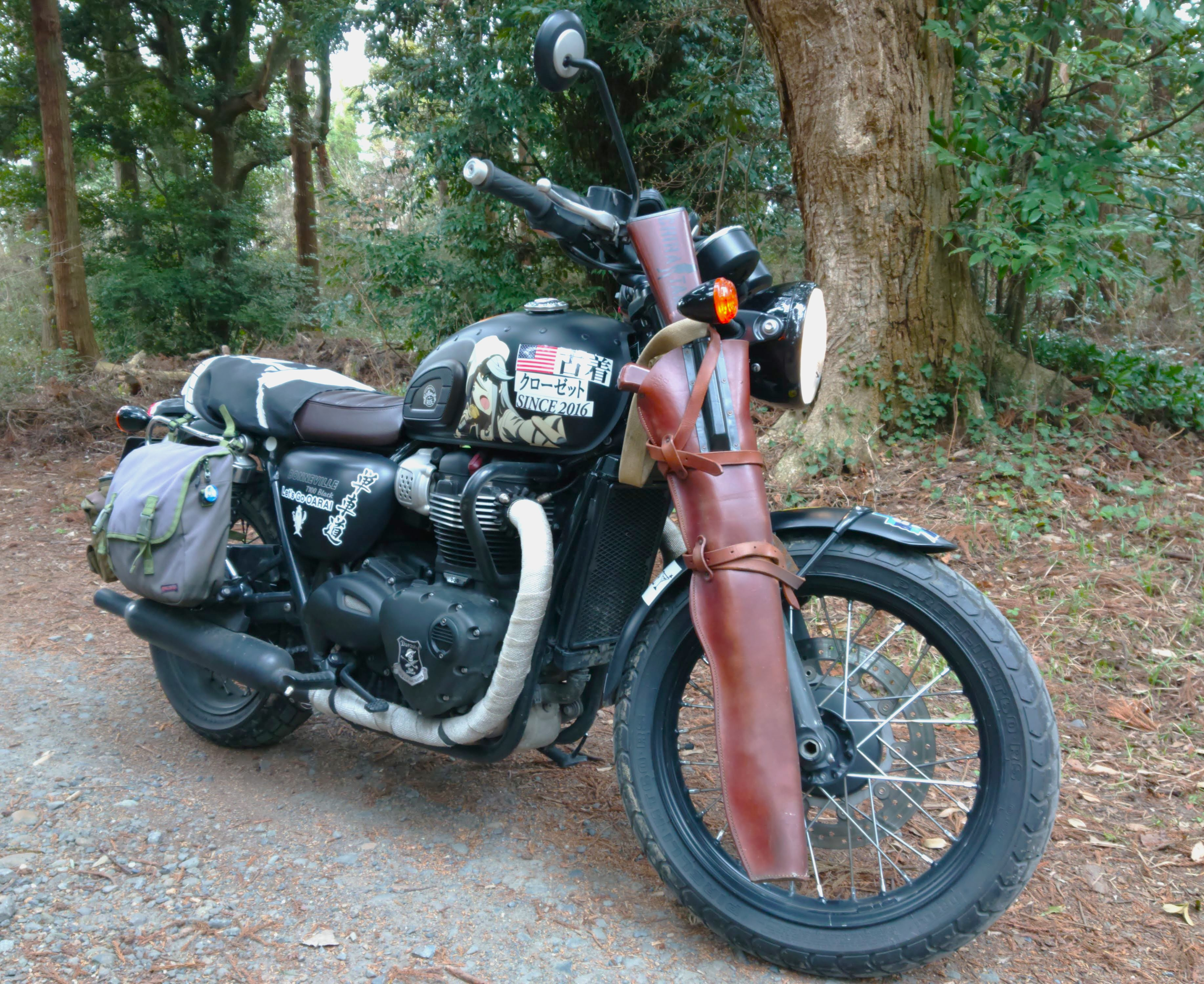
A Triumph Bonneville T100 featuring Flint from Girls und Panzer

In Japan, an itasha (痛車; literally "painful car") is a car decorated with images of characters from anime, manga, or video games (especially bishōjo games or eroge). The decorations usually involve paint schemes and stickers. The cars are seen prominently in places such as Akihabara (Tokyo), Nipponbashi (Osaka), or Ōsu (Nagoya), or Itasha-based events, such as Odaiba Itasha Tengoku.

Itasha only applies to cars. There are different names for vehicles that have features of an itasha, such as itansha (痛単車) for motorcycles, itachari (痛チャリ) for bicycles, itabasu (痛バス) for buses, itatorakku (痛トラック) for trucks, itadensha (痛電車) for trains, and itahikōki (痛飛行機) for aircraft.

== Etymology ==
In the 1980s, when Japan was at the zenith of its economic might, there were many luxury import cars in Tokyo. Among them, the "itasha"—originally Japanese slang meaning an imported Italian car—was the most desired. Since then, itasha (as the decorated vehicle) was derived from combining the Japanese words itai (痛い; painful, cringe, embarrassing) and sha (車; vehicle). Itai means "painful", with additional senses of "painfully embarrassing" → "cringeworthy", "painful for the wallet" due to the high costs involved, or "painful to look at" (an eyesore). The name is also a pun for Italian cars (イタリア車, Itaria-sha), truncated in Japanese slang as Itasha (イタ車).

== History ==
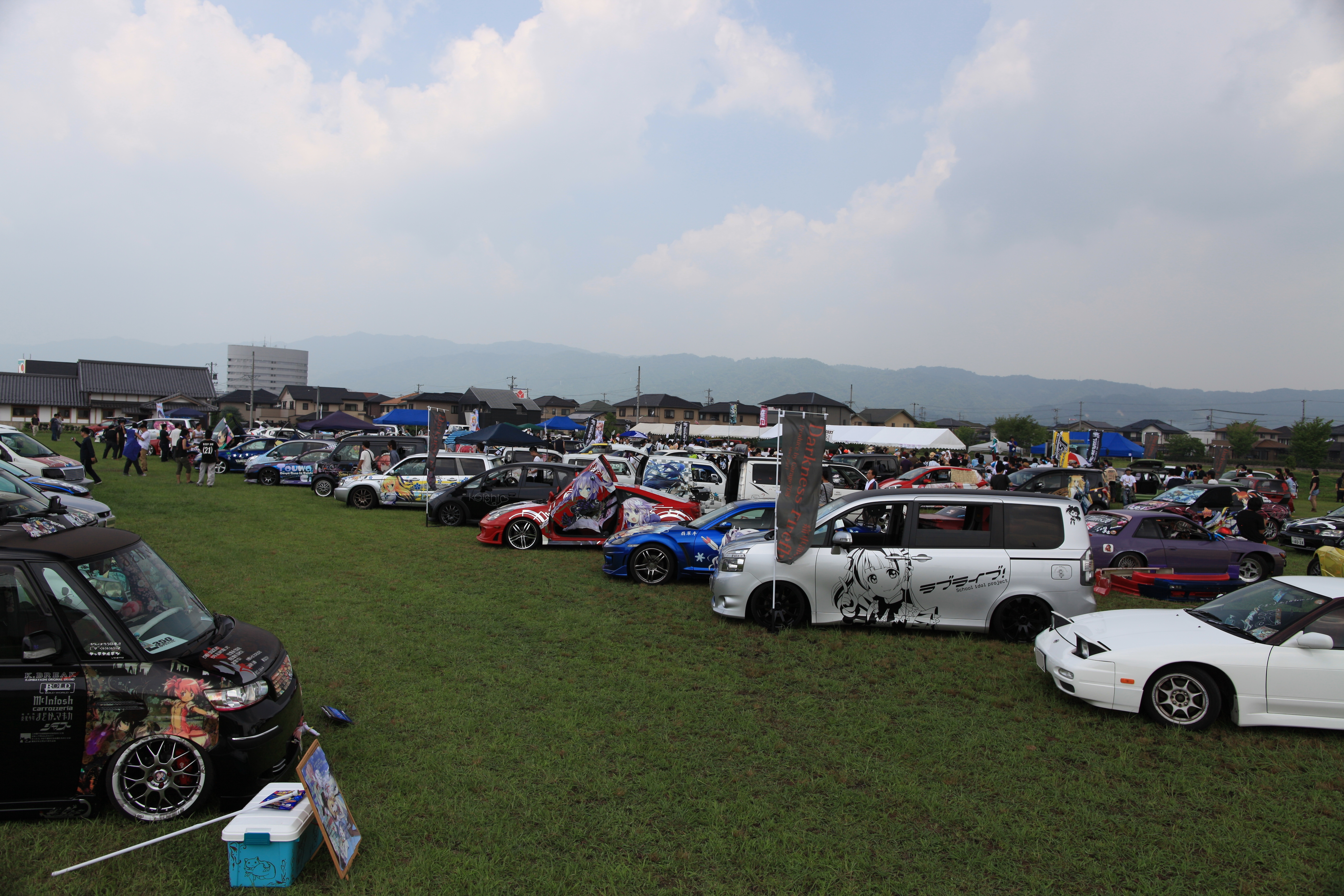
Itasha car meet, Moesha-ofu, in Iga, Mie

The subculture started in Japan in the 1980s with character plushies and stickers, but only became a phenomenon in the twenty-first century, when anime culture became relatively well known via the Internet. The earliest known report of an itasha-decorated vehicle in convention was in August 2005, in Comiket 68.

=== Conventions ===
In 2007, the first Autosalone (あうとさろーね, Autosarōne), an itasha-oriented convention, was held in Ariake, near Comiket. Since then, the subculture has grown and allows people to express themselves and show off their customization to fellow friends and competitors. In 2019, Odaiba Itasha Tengoku, which took place in Odaiba, Tokyo, was also held. Another Itasha-JDM event was held on March 27 named "Itasha Tengoku JDM Paradise".

=== International movement ===
Similarly decorated vehicles have been found in Taiwan, the Philippines and in Italy.

== Vehicles owned by character rights owner ==
The executive director of ACID Co., Ltd. (parent company of game developer Âge), Hirohiko Yoshida, was reported to own a Muv-Luv-themed Lamborghini Gallardo, Lancia Stratos, and BMW M5. The cars were unveiled in 2008 âge×Nitro+ in Akihabara UDX Gallery.

Good Smile Co. has sponsored Super GT GT300 cars with liveries featuring itasha-like illustrations of Hatsune Miku since 2008. In 2010, they spun off from their sponsored team to start their own team called Good Smile Racing. These cars are often also featured at conventions like Anime Expo. In 2019, Good Smile partnered with Type-Moon and TRIGGER to field cars with itasha liveries for Miku, Fate, and Promare at the 2019 24 Hours of Spa.

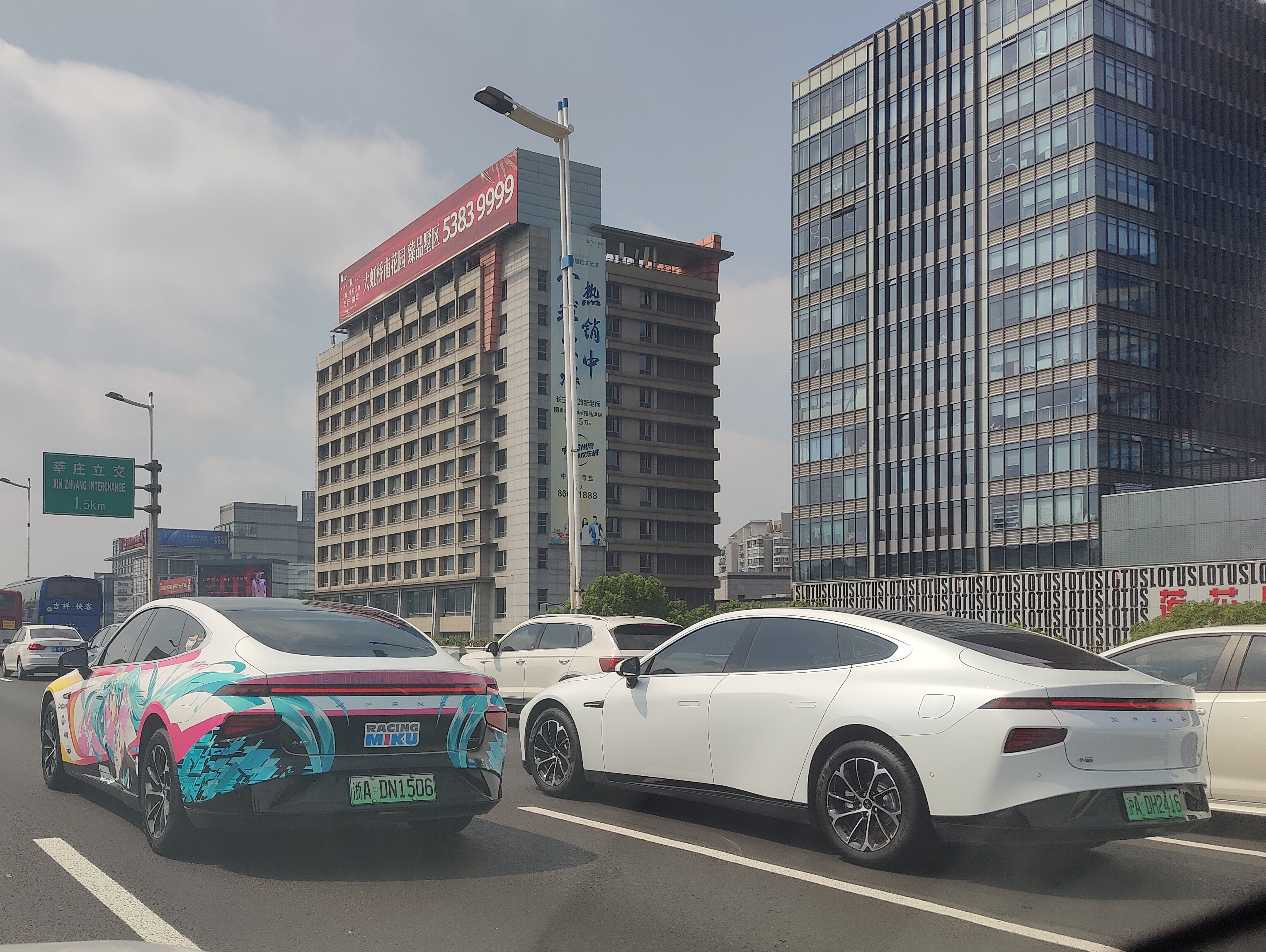
An itasha in Shanghai, China with Miku on a Xpeng P7 next to a regular Xpeng P7

== Vehicles from automotive manufacturers ==
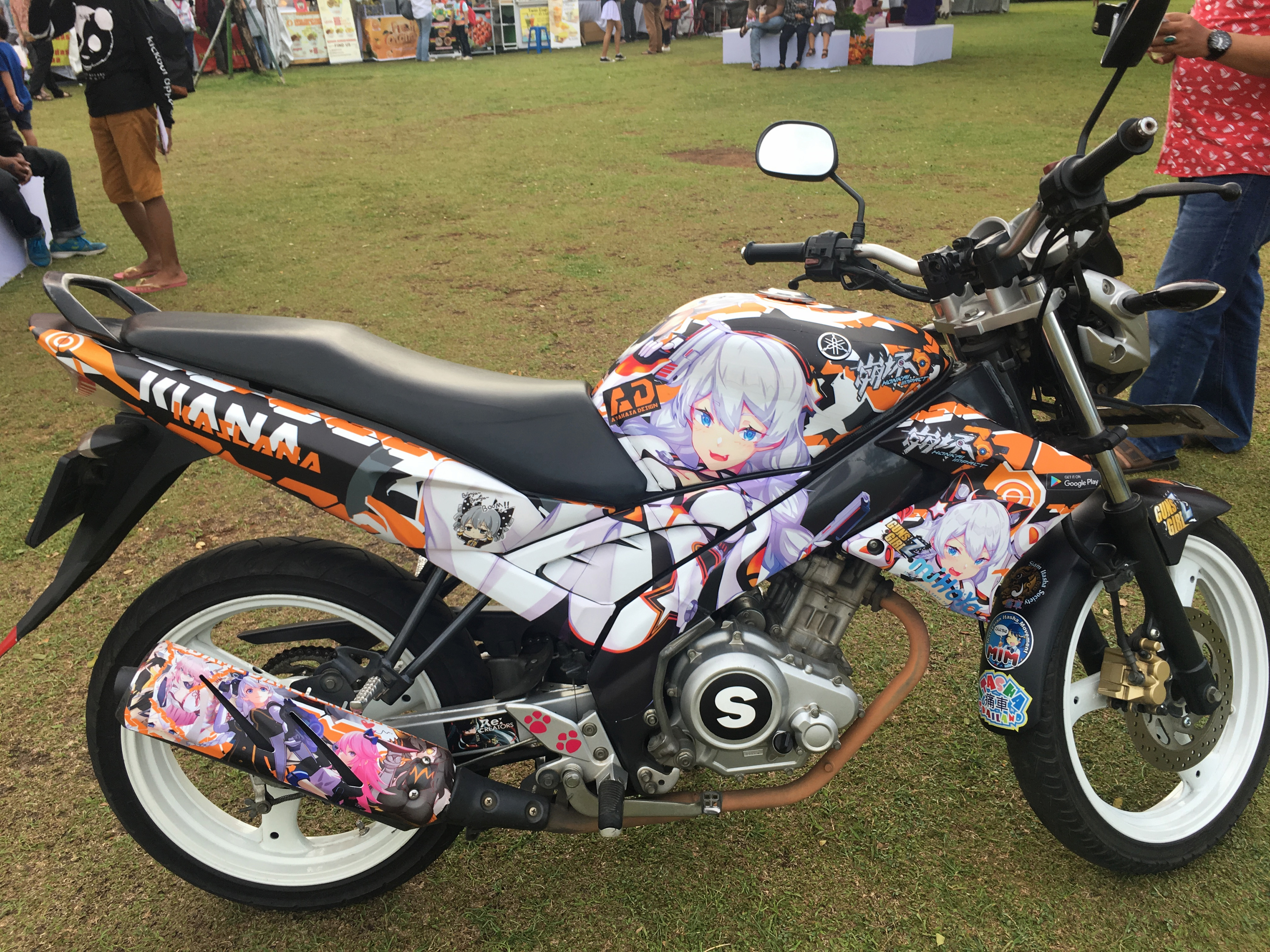
An itansha in South Tangerang, Indonesia featuring characters from Honkai Impact 3rd on the body

In Nagoya Auto Trend in 2009, a Phantom of Inferno–themed Chevrolet Corvette, a Melonbooks-themed MINI Cooper, and a Chaos;Head Noah–themed Toyota Estima were unveiled.

== Licensed model vehicles ==
Officially licensed itasha cars can be found both in display and R/C car models.

In June 2008, Aoshima Bunka Kyozai launched "ITASHA" as one of their model car product lines. Since then, many model companies have produced various itasha versions of their car models. Fujimi, Kyosho, HPI and Tamiya also sell models with itasha decorations.

Recently, combinations between models and actual itasha are increasing, wherein models based on the original itasha were made afterwards.

== Derivative uses ==
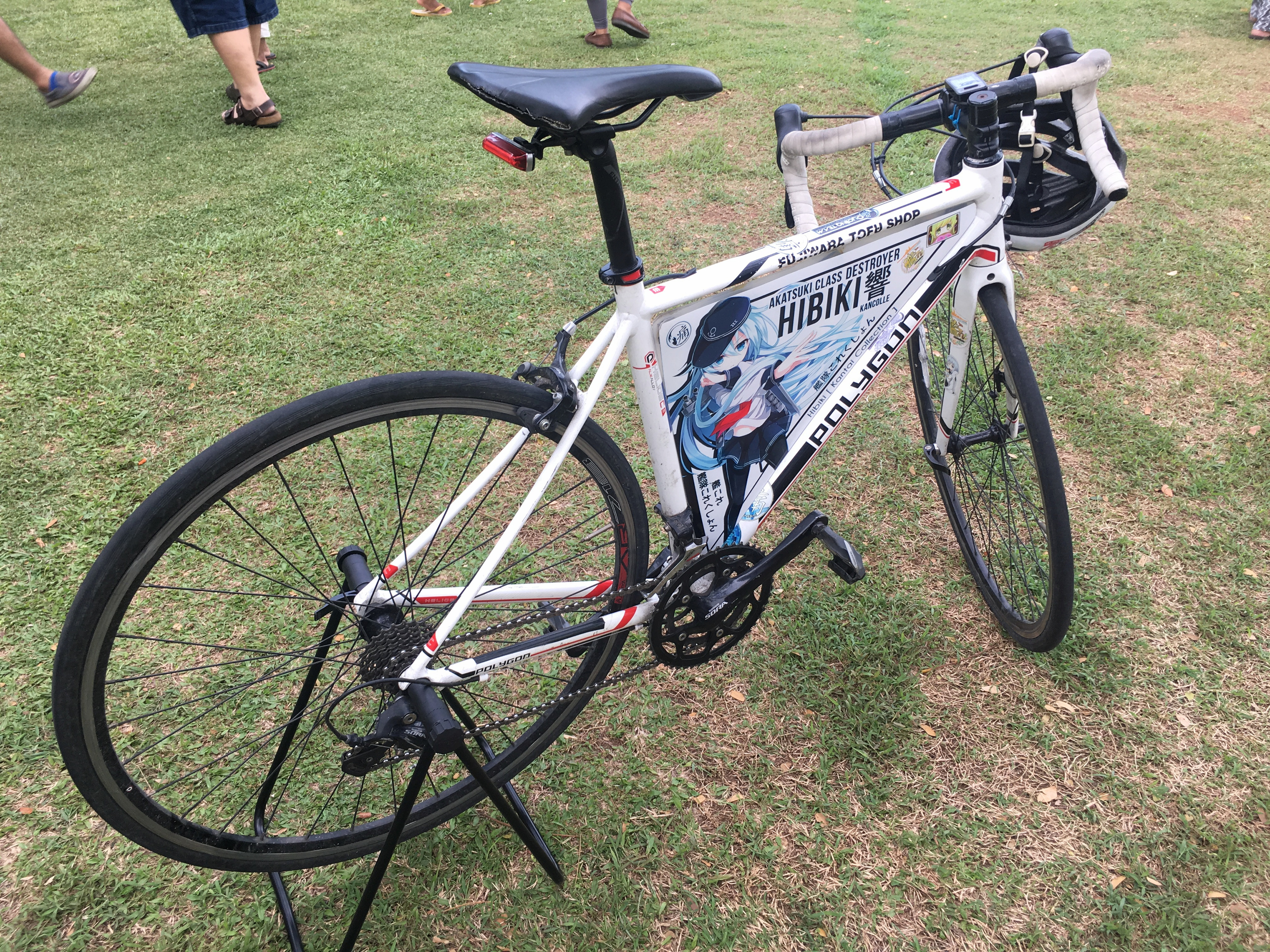
An itachari in South Tangerang, Indonesia featuring Hibiki from Kantai Collection on the frame

The itasha decorative style has also been found on railway cars, aircraft, computer cases, and other products. The itasha equivalent in apparel is the "ita-bag", a bag covered in fandom-related badges, buttons, etc. At Shinto shrines and Buddhist temples, ema are small wooden tablets that are usually inscribed with a wish. The itasha version, "ita-ema", describes ema featuring usually hand-drawn illustrations of characters.

In-vehicle electronics, such as navigation systems, were also reported to be customized with character voices. On 28 March 2008, Maplus began to offer character voices for its Maplus Portable Navi 2 GPS system, beginning with Shūichi Ikeda (Char Aznable from the Gundam franchise).

Automotive consumables such as motor oil have also been customized. On 20 June 2009, T&E, a tuning shop, began to sell scented semi-synthetic motor oil under the Itayu brand, with the first product being a Lucky Star-themed motor oil, unveiled at the 48th Shizuoka Hobby Show 2009.

== See also ==
- Art car
- Dekochari – decorated bicycles
- Dekotora – decorated trucks
- Ita-bag – decorated bags
- Moe
