= Cut-off =

Modified and decorated jacket worn in biker, metal and punk subcultures

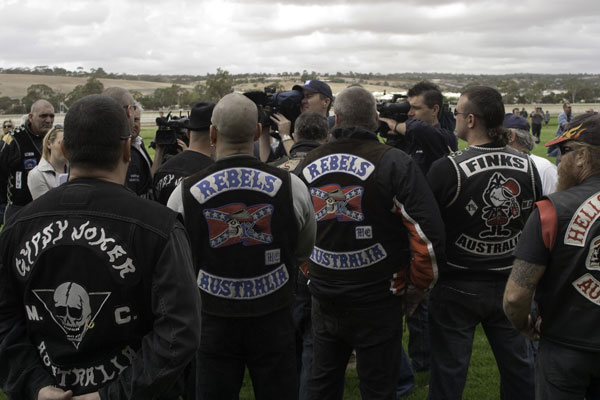
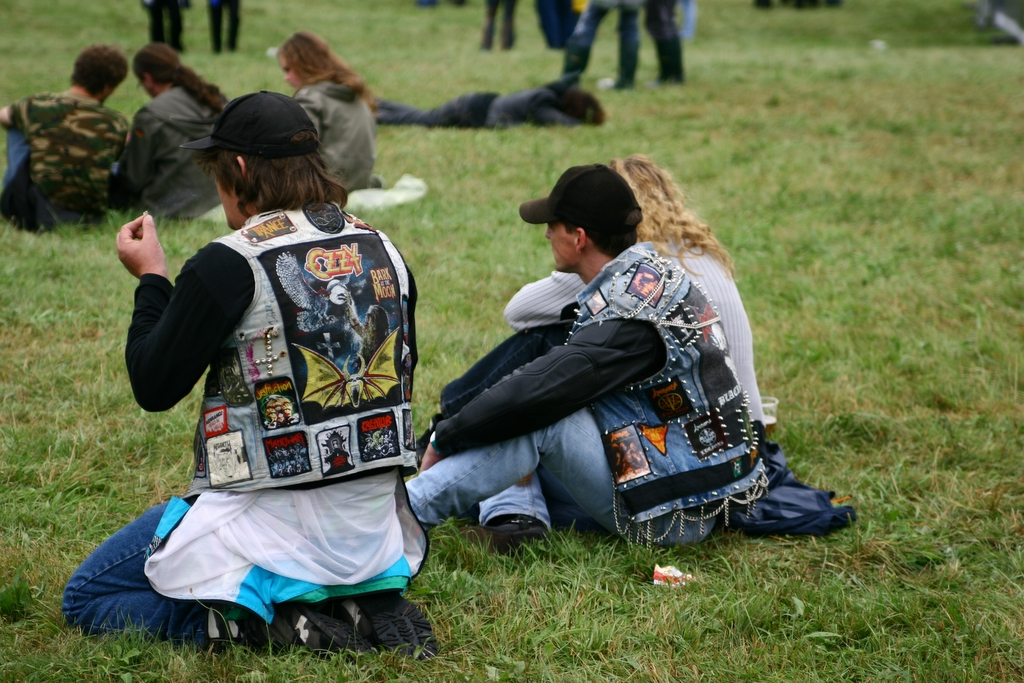
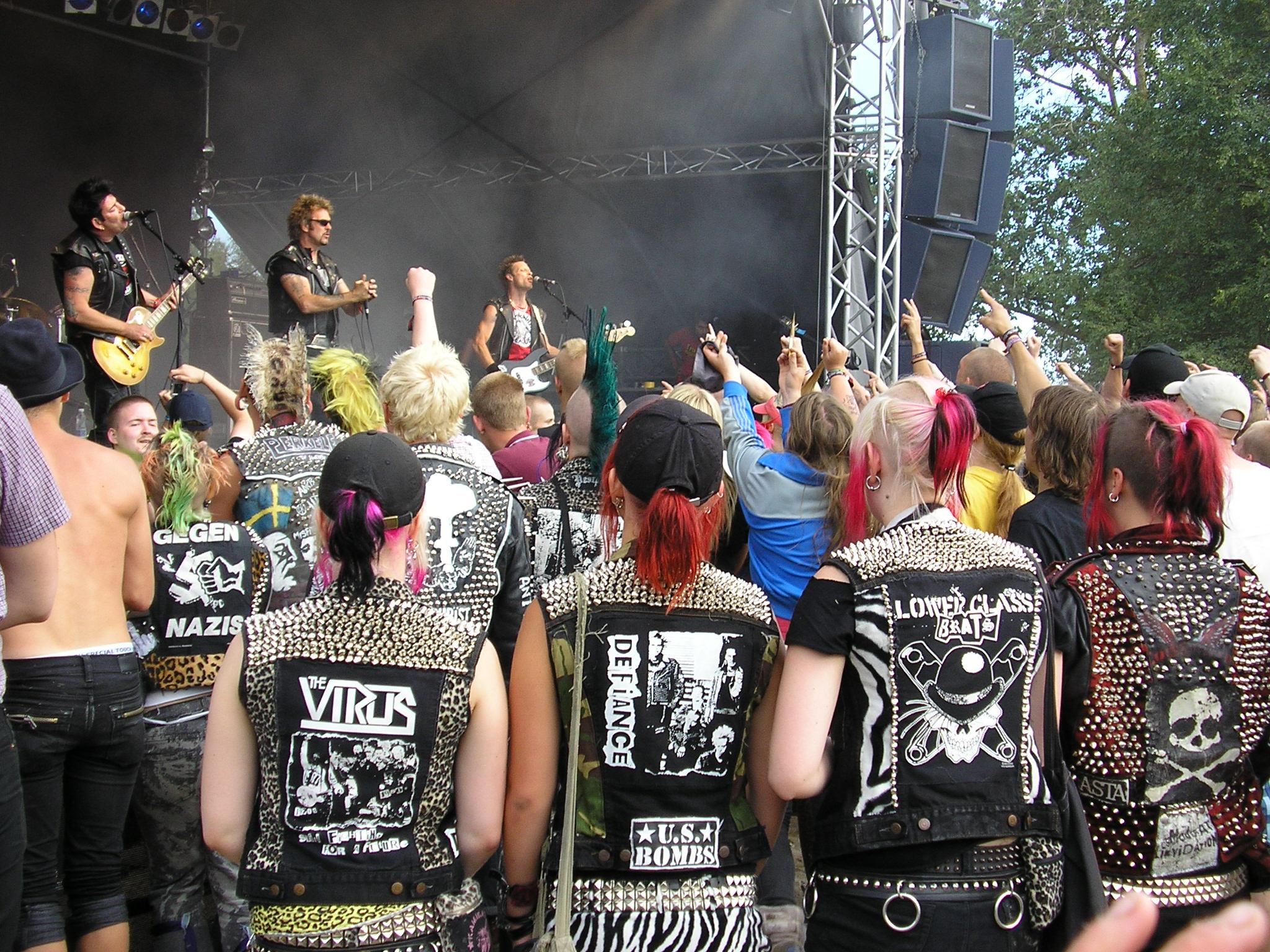
Cut offs being worn by bikers (top), metalheads (middle) and punks (bottom)

A cut-off, cut, kutte or battle vest (when sleeveless) and a battle jacket or patch jacket (regardless of sleeves), is a jacket adorned with patches related to the wearer's subculture or general interests. Patch jackets are generally made using denim jackets or leather jackets, often times with the sleeves cut off. The patches themselves are typically embroidered, woven or printed onto a fabric base such as twill. They are a prominent part of various subcultures including bikers, metalheads and punks. In music subcultures, they are generally worn with patches for bands which the wearer is a fan of, whereas in the biker subculture, "colours" signify the wearer's motorcycle club and their rank within it.

Patch jackets have their origins in the United States Army Air Corps during World War II, where airmen would sew patches onto their regulation flight jackets. Upon returning from war, the practice was continued by former airmen who became a part of motorcycle clubs. The influence of the biker subculture then led to the garments adoption by various other youth subcultures in the following decades. The garment became popular with punks and metalheads during the 1970s and 1980s.

== Origins ==
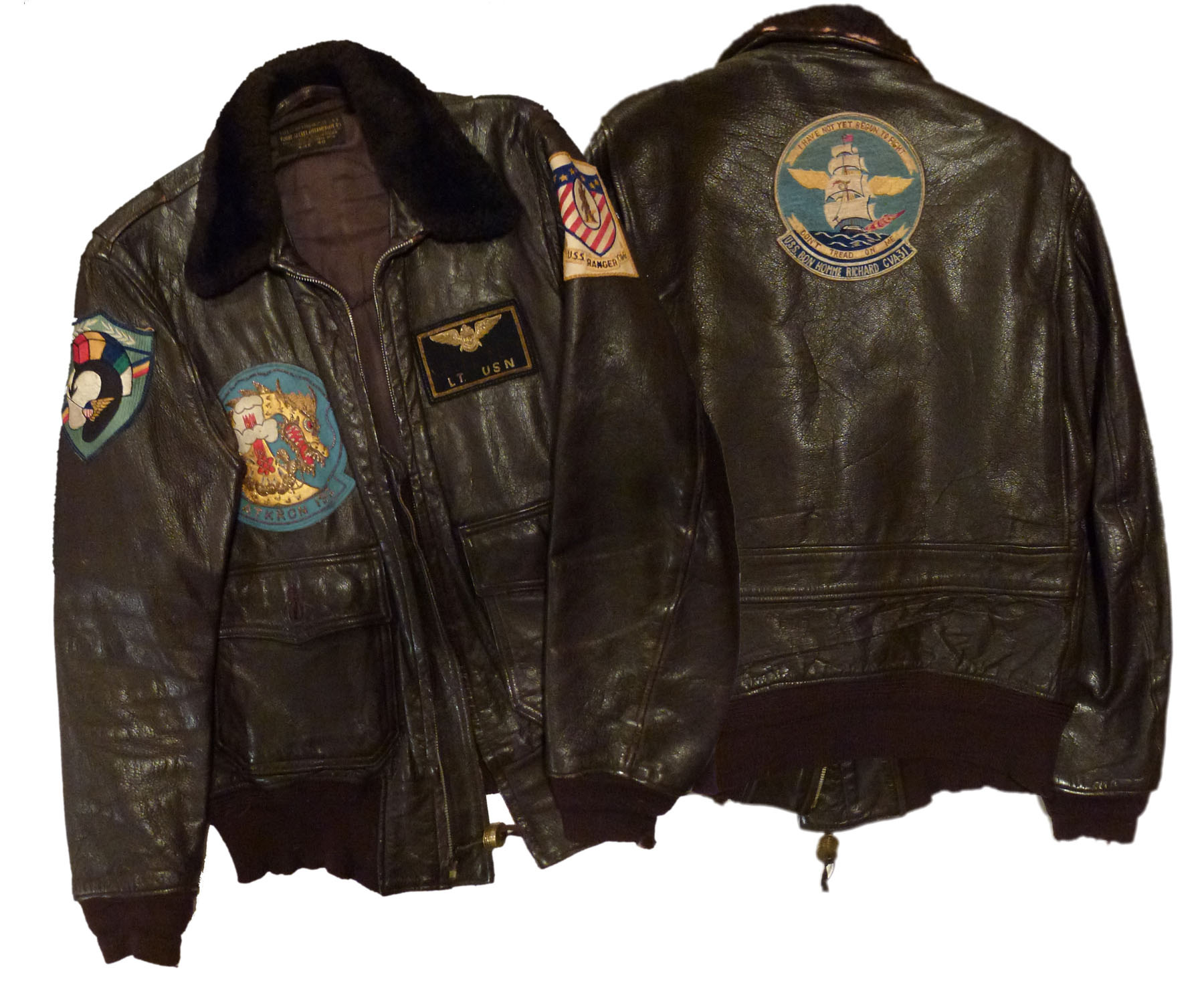
A flight jacket adorned with patches by a 1950s United States airman

During World War II, members of the United States Army Air Corps began to decorate their regulation flight jackets with patches of successful missions as well as cartoon characters and pin-up models. Following the war, many former airmen began motorcycling and became members of motorcycle clubs, where they continued this practice. Cut offs and motorcycling soon spread internationally, being taken up by the rocker subculture in the United Kingdom and the Bōsōzoku in Japan. Cut offs' ties to motorcycling led to them becoming seen as a sign of rebellion. Because of this, they were soon adopted by various subcultures, including the skinhead, heavy metal and punk subcultures.

== Motorcycle clubs ==
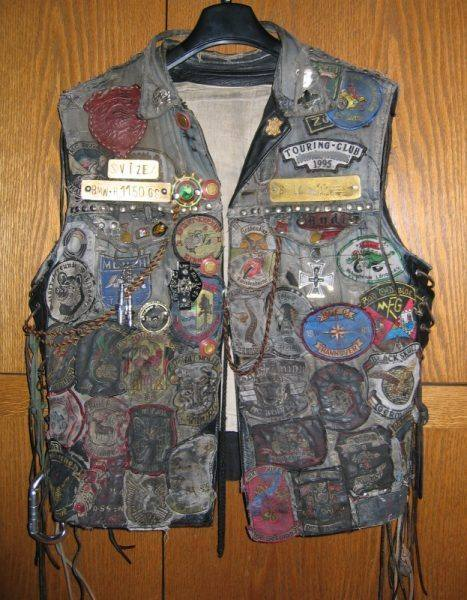
Biker's vintage cut-off adorned with club badges

Upon returning from World War II, many former airmen began motorcycling. These bikers quickly began wearing denim jackets with their sleeves cut off and sewing on patches to display their associated motorcycle club, called colors. In outlaw motorcycle clubs, a cut off's colours are indicative of the wear's rank within the club, where the higher number of club-related patches represents a higher rank. In contrast, non-outlaw motorcycle clubs often only have one large back patch. As time passed, many bikers began instead making cut offs from leather jackets, rather than denim.

Cut-offs are usually made from leather or denim jackets with their sleeves removed, or cut very short, and often adorned with patches, badges and painted artwork that display motorcycle club affiliations known as colours, or alternatively band names, political affiliations, beliefs, or sexual acts performed.

== Heavy metal ==
Metalheads adopted cut offs in the 1970s, beginning with bikers who began to wear patches for heavy metal bands. During the 1970s, many patches were embroidered by the wearer, as most bands did not produce them for purchase. Metalheads popularized the name "battle jacket" for the garment during the 1980s, when it became commonplace for band patches to be sold at live performances. This decade was when the garment was most popular in metal, being commonplace during the new wave of British heavy metal and the early thrash metal scenes. Battle jacket decreased in popularity in the metal subculture during the 1990s as the subculture became increasingly influenced by fashions of grunge and nu metal. However, battle jackets continued to be worn in black metal and death metal scenes, leading to their eventual re-popularisation in the 2000s.

== Punk ==
Battle jackets entered punk during the 1970s and 1980s. Often using a leather motorcycle jacket as a base, band logos are more likely to be painted onto the jacket than sewn on using a patch. They also often feature chains, studs and political slogans.

== See also ==
- Ita-bag
- Pearlies
