= Fujimi Mokei =

Japanese plastic model manufacturer

Fujimi Mokei Co., LTD
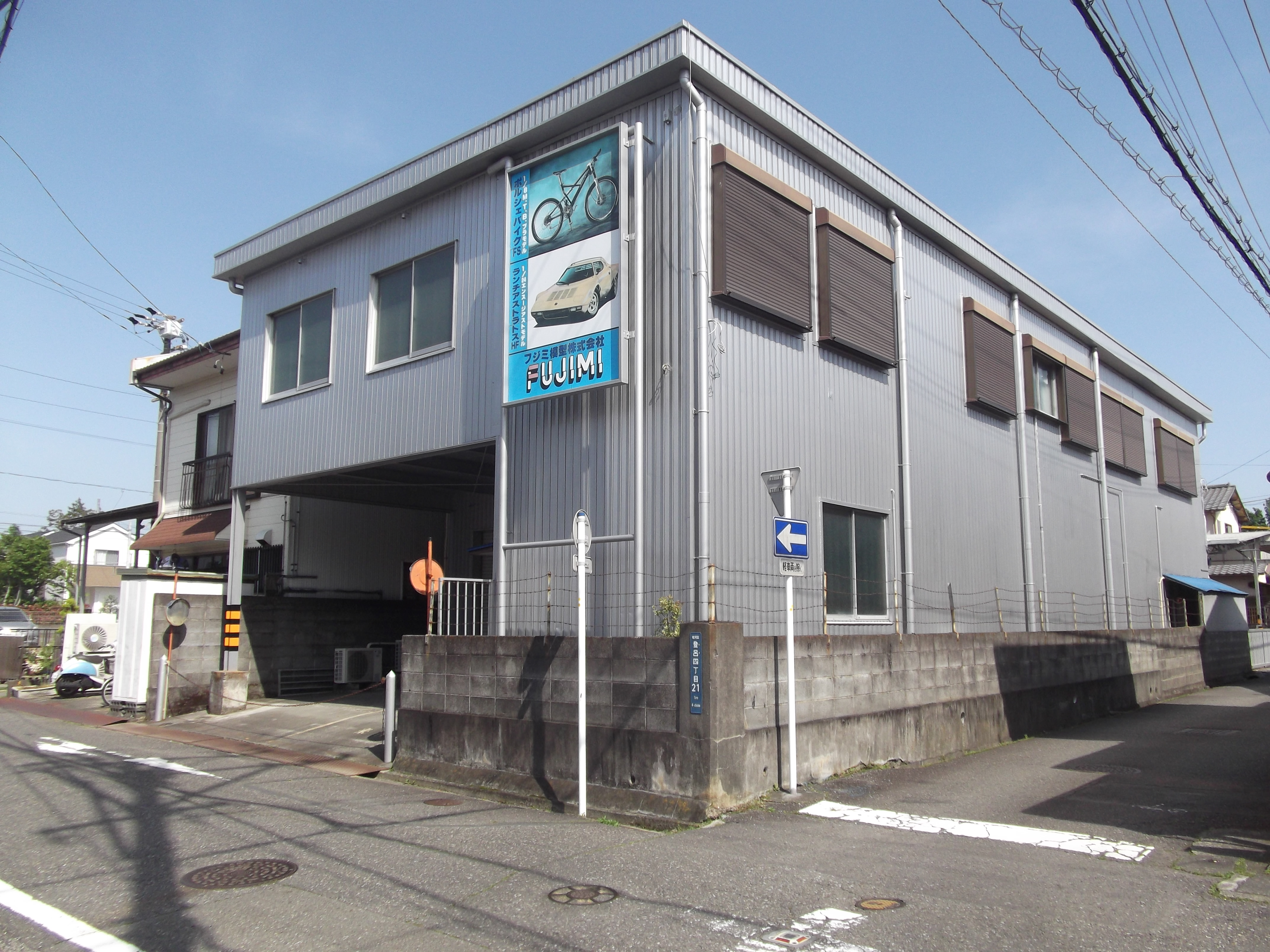
- Fujimi Mokei Co. headquarters, Shizuoka City
- Industry: Toy manufacturing
- Founded: 1948; 77 years ago in Shizuoka City, Shizuoka Prefecture, Japan
- Founder: Shigeichi Saito
- Headquarters: Shizuoka City, Japan
- Area served: Japan, International
- Products: Scale models
- Website: www.fujimimokei.com

Fujimi Mokei Co., Ltd. (フジミ模型株式会社, Fujimi Mokei Kabushiki Gaisha) is a Japanese model manufacturer based in Shizuoka Prefecture. It produces plastic model kits of a variety of vehicles, including model aircraft, model cars, model ships and model armored vehicles along with historical structures and science fiction kits. Since "mokei" means "model" in Japanese, "Fujimi Mokei" is often called "Fujimi Model(s)" in English.

== History ==
Fujimi was founded in 1948 by Shigekazu Saito and Eiichi Imai as "Fujimi Mokei Kyozaisha", initially producing wooden ship models. In 1961, it started to produce plastic model kits, and the company name was changed to "Fujimi Mokei Co., Ltd.". In the 1960s, it released 1/70 and 1/50 scale airplanes, 1/550 scale warships, 1/44 scale tanks, and historical structures in various scales.

In 1970, Fujimi started producing airplane models in 1/72 and 1/48 scales. In 1971, it started to release the 1:700 scale Waterline series warship models along with three other Shizuoka-based model manufacturers; Tamiya, Hasegawa and Aoshima. Also in 1971, Fujimi began to produce 1:76 scale World Armour series, competing against Airfix HO/OO scale military models. In the mid-1970s, it began producing 1:20 and 1:24 scale automobile models.

In 1988, with the bankruptcy of Japanese model manufacturer Nitto, ex-Nitto 1/76 scale military models were added to Fujimi's World Armour series. In 1992, Fujimi discontinued the Waterline series and reorganized its warship models as the Sea Way Model series.

== Product lines ==
=== Aircraft ===
1/72 scale aircraft
One of the Fujimi's main product lines. Like its neighbor Hasegawa, Fujimi has released many World War II era Japanese warplane models, but its range contains many more minor airplanes, such as bombers, attack aircraft, surveillance aircraft, and seaplanes. In its modern jet plane range, Fujimi also released minor airplanes such as the Vought F7U Cutlass, British Phantom, and MiG-21 variations. For example, Fujimi's Northrop Grumman E-2 Hawkeye was the only 1/72 scale E-2 model for a long time until Hasegawa released the E-2C in the late 2000s. It was initially released as the E-2A in 1970, later modified to the E-2C, and finally modified to the Hawkeye 2000 style in the mid 2000s.
1/48 scale aircraft
Although Fujimi released over fifty 1/48 scale aircraft kits until the early 1990s, around ten kits are available as of 2014.
1/144 scale aircraft
Boeing B-29 Superfortress and Japanese interceptors were released in the mid-2000s. Some helicopter models were released in the early 1980s.

=== Warships ===
1/700 scale Sea Way Model series
Waterline type models. This line consists of ex-Waterline series World War II era warships and modern US warships, such as the Kitty Hawk-class aircraft carrier, Ticonderoga-class cruiser, Spruance-class destroyer, and Oliver Hazard Perry-class frigate, which were released in the mid-1990s.
1/700 scale Sea Way Model "Special" ("Toku") series
Newly tooled waterline type Imperial Japanese Navy warship models. This line started in the mid 2000s, and contains almost all types of Japanese battleships and aircraft carriers, most destroyer types and many cruisers. It also contains auxiliary ships such as minelayers, seaplane carriers, tankers, and transport ships. Many models of this series are highly detailed, the most recent ones are regarded as top standard with detail levels equaling the much larger 350 scale kits. Also, the series contains ships never offered in any scale by any other manufacturer like the three-flight-deck version of carrier "Kaga", the late heavy cruiser "Ibuki" in its "as designed" guise, light cruisers "Sakawa" and "Noshiro", escort carrier "Kaiyo", or the final appearance of "Kaga" as she was at Midway (with three pairs of struts under the forward flight deck and the final AA fit).
1/700 scale IJN series
Full-hull version of the Sea Way Model "Special" series.
1/700 scale "Next" series
Full-hull (with waterline option) computer designed multi-color parts kits of IJN ships which do not need painting for authentic results and allowing quick construction by improved fitting techniques, still being highly detailed. Some 20 kits including various versions of "Yamato" and "Musashi", fast battleships "Kongô", "Hiei" and "Haruna", battleship "Nagato", carriers "Akagi" and "Shinano", light cruisers "Kuma" and "Tama" as well as several double kits of destroyer types have been issued as of spring, 2023. Special versions are marked "X-", for example a "Shinano" with transparent flight deck showing the hangar deck below.
1/350 scale Warship
High-detailed full-hull models. This line contains the Japanese Kongo and Fuso class battleships, Ise class aerial battleship, and Shokaku class aircraft carriers. The first model, battleship Kongo, was released in 2007.
1/500 scale Warship
This mid-scale line was started in 2009. It consists of the battleships Yamato and Nagato.

=== Armored vehicles ===
1/72 scale Military series
This line was started in 2010 and consists of German Tiger I, Opel Blitz, Japanese type 10 tank, and 3 1/2 ton truck variations.
1/76 scale Special World Armor series
This line consists of mostly World War II era military vehicles and some modern Japanese tanks such as the Type 90. Almost all kits were initially released in the early 1970s by Fujimi or Nitto. Tiger I late type, JS-2, and JGSDF tanks were released in the mid 1990s.

=== Automobiles ===
1/16 scale Super Car series
Supercar models such as the Ferrari F40.
1/20 scale Grand Prix series
Formula One car models such as various Ferrari machines.
1/24 scale Inch up (ID) car series
A main automobile line. It consists of various Japanese car models.
1/24 scale Real Sports Car series
This line consists of sports car models from around the world.
1/24 scale Enthusiast Model
Super detailed models including metal cast or etched metal parts.
1/24 scale Nostalgic Racer
Japanese sports car models of the 1970s
1/24 scale Tōge Car

This line mainly consists of cars used by racers of the illegal street racing scene of the 90's in mountain-passes, mostly known as Tōge.

1/24 scale Historic Racing Car
World racing car models of the 1960s and 1970s.
1/24 scale Initial D
Car models from manga/anime series Initial D.
1/24 scale Chara Decal series
Itasha (anime character-decorated car) models.
1/32 scale Truck series
Japanese truck models
1/32 scale Tour Bus series

=== Historical structures ===
Various scale Japanese castle and temple models.

=== Science fiction mecha ===
This line consists of mecha from the Ultraman and Ultraseven TV series, as well as 1/700 scale Gotengo from Atragon and 1/24 scale Spinner from Blade Runner.

== US importers ==
From the mid-1960s, UPC (Universal Powermaster Corporation) reboxed and issued 1/70 scale airplane kits. In the late 1960s, AHM (Associated Hobby Manufacturers) imported Fujimi kits into the USA and added their logo to the boxes. In 1970, Bachmann Industries became the US importer and released various Fujimi kits at the time with Bachmann/Fujimi logo. From the mid-1980s Testor Corporation imported Fujimi aircraft kits and sold them in their original packaging.
