= Dōtan kyohi =

Concept in otaku culture

Dōtan kyohi (Japanese: 同担拒否; lit. 'opponents of sharing') is a Japanese slang that refers to people who cannot tolerate other fans of the same idol group or character (oshi).

== Etymology ==
Dōtan kyohi came from the two terms dōtan (同担) and kyohi (拒否). Dōtan literally means "to bear the same burden" but sometimes translates to "shared support". It is derived from the term tantō (担当), which refers to one's oshi. The term is based on the concept of "appreciating a character or an idol" and "recommending it to others, converting them, in order to contribute to his/her promotion." Meanwhile, kyohi literally translates to "refusal", which refers to the "exclusive and uncompromising" nature of their commitment to their "oshi".

== Origin and spread ==
The term was originally used by Johnny & Associates fans, particularly those of SMAP during the height of their popularity in the mid-1990s. It later spread to idol fans and anime fans.

== Types ==
Shinrin-gai dōtan kyohi (親輪外同担拒否; lit. 'refusal of sharing outside of the circle') refers to people who reject fellow fans who are outside their own community. They usually lift their exclusion after getting to know someone better. Jōken hatsudō-gata dōtan kyohi (条件発動型同担拒否; lit. 'conditional refusal to share') refers to fans who otherwise get along well suddenly developing an aversion to one another if a certain condition is met. A more extreme type is dōtan ganko kyohi (同担頑固拒否; lit. 'resolute opponents of sharing') or dōtan kyohi kageki-ha (同担拒否過激派; lit. 'refusal to share extremism'). They are highly likely to be harsh or aggressive toward other fans of that same character.

In contrast, dōtan kangei (同担歓迎; lit. 'supporters of sharing'), which refers to tolerant fans of the certain fandom.

== Incidents ==
A 38-year-old man stabbed a 32-year-old man with a knife at the venue of Aniera Festa 2024, which was held in Nagano Prefecture on September 22, 2024. The man held a grudge against fans who supported his favorite voice actor, and admitted to the charge of trying to kill him.

== See also ==
- Parasocial interaction – Type of psychological relationship
