= Aoshima Bunka Kyozai =

Model manufacturer based in Shizuoka Prefecture, Japan

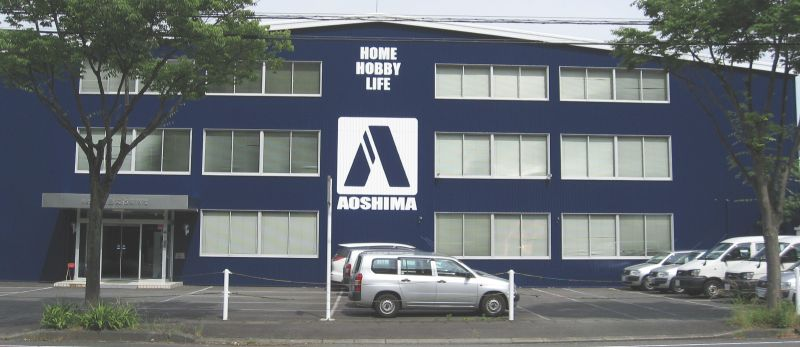
Company premises in Japan.

Aoshima Bunka Kyozai Co., Ltd. (株式会社 青島文化教材社, Kabushiki Gaisha Aoshima Bunka Kyōzaisha), commonly truncated to Aoshima, is a Japanese model manufacturer based in Shizuoka Prefecture. It produces plastic model kits of a variety of vehicles, including model car, model aircraft, model ship and model Sci-fi mecha under Aoshima brand, along with finished toys under Skynet brand, diecast models under Miracle House brand, diecast cars under DISM brand and female statue figures under FunnyKnights brand.

== History ==
In 1924, "Aoshima Airplane Research Institute" (青島飛行機研究所) was founded by airplane pilot Jiro Aoshima. In 1932, model-airplane was designated as an educational material in Japanese schools, and "Shizuoka model-airplane association" (静岡県模型飛行機工業組合) was established. Jiro Aoshima acceded to the chairman's post.

"Aoshima Bunka Kyozai RL" (青島文化教材研究所) was established in 1945. It was focusing on the wooden model-airplane manufacturing.

"Aoshima Bunka Kyozai Inc." (有限会社 青島文化教材社) was established in 1961. Ichiro Aoshima acceded to the CEO's post. It released the first plastic model kit "Speed Boat Bluebird" in the same year. Then it started to develop plastic model kits in earnest.

In the 1960s, Aoshima released 1/60 and 1/72 scale airplane models, 1/24 and 1/25 scale car models and original design sci-fi mecha models. In 1969, it released "Apollo series" spacecraft models including 1/48 scale "Eagle 5" Apollo Lunar Module and 1/96 scale Apollo spacecraft. These models became a big hit. In 1971, it started to release the 1/700 scale "Water Line series" warship models along with other three Shizuoka-based model manufacturers, Tamiya, Hasegawa and Fujimi.

In the 1970s, Aoshima succeeded in the original development of kids products such as "Gattai Robo" (coalescent robot) series. In this series, four individual vehicles could coalesce into one robot. In 1980, it started to release "Anime scale" realistic robot models such as Ideon as a countermeasure against megahit Gundam models of Bandai.

Aoshima was re-established as "Aoshima Bunka Kyozai Co., Ltd." (株式会社 青島文化教材社) in 1986. It launched a new brand "Skynet" (finished toy brand) in 1997, and also launched a new brand "Miracle House" (diecast figure brand) in 1999.

In 2002, with the bankruptcy of Japanese model manufacturer Imai Kagaku, Aoshima acquired the molds of sailing ships and sci-fi vehicles such as Thunderbirds machines.

In 2005, Aoshima launched a new brand "DISM" (diecast car brand), and established "Aoshima Hong Kong, Ltd." (青島香港有限公司). Another new brand "FunnyKnights" (female statue figure brand) was launched in 2007. In 2008, Aoshima started to release "Itasha" (animation wrapping car) model kits and they gained a huge popularity. In 2010, Hayabusa (Space Craft Plastic Model Kit Series) made a big hit.

== Product lines ==
=== Aircraft ===
1/72 scale Fighter planes of World War II series
Fifteen World War II era single engine airplanes and two twin engine airplanes were released in the 1960s. There were minor airplanes such as Reppu (Sam), Shiun (Norm), Seiran, Zuiun (Paul) and P-63 Kingcobra among them. These models were rereleased several times, and some of them were available until the mid 2000s.
1/72 scale True fighter planes of World War II series
In 1996, new 1/72 scale airplane models were released. This line consists of Kawanishi N1K1-Ja/Jb "Shiden", N1K2-J/Jb "Shiden kai" and Focke-Wulf Ta 152H-0/H-1. These models were rereleased in "Ace of Legend" series and "CG Squadron" series. In 2013, new model, Kawasaki Ki-100 were released in this series.

=== Spacecraft ===
Apollo series
About ten Apollo program related models were released in 1969 and 1970. While many of them were discontinued, 1/48 scale Apollo Lunar Module, 1/96 scale Apollo spacecraft with Lunar Module, and small scale Saturn V with launching pad were rereleased several times; the latest in 2009, the 40th anniversary of the Apollo 11 Moon landing.
Space Craft series
This series started in the early 2010s. The line consists of Japanese spacecraft and launching rockets, such as 1/32 scale Hayabusa and 1/72 scale H-II Transfer Vehicle.

=== Warships ===
1/700 scale Water Line series
This series started in 1971 and renewal series (second edition) started in the early 1990s. This line consists of mainly WWII era Japanese warships and some foreign warships. Almost Japanese warships have finished renewal, and some new WWII warships and modern JMSDF ships were added in renewal series. However, as to the foreign warships, only German battleships Bismarck and Tirpitz have been renewed. Early Aoshima products were of poor quality in historical investigation and molding-technic, but several newly released second edition kits are said to be of excellent quality.
1/350 scale Iron Clad series
This series was started in 2007 and consists of full-hull models of WWII era Japanese warship such as Kongo class battleship, Takao class and Myoko class heavy cruiser, Nagara class and Kuma class light cruiser and some submarines.

=== Military vehicles ===
1/72 scale Military series
This line was started in 2012 and consists of modern Japanese military vehicles such as JGSDF 3 1/2 ton truck variations, material carrier vehicle and Type 60 self-propelled 106 mm recoilless rifle.
1/48 scale Remote Control AFV series
This line consists of JGSDF AFVs (such as type 74 MBT, Type 87 SPAAG, Type 89 IFV and Type 90 MBT), Modern MBTs (such as M1 Abrams and Leopard 2) and WWII era German tanks such as Tiger II.

=== Automobiles ===
Aoshima's car model range (in the universally popular 1/24 scale) strikes a good chord with modellers, particularly because much of their product range focuses on Japanese domestic models - well known in the actual size - but not as models.

1/24 scale The Best car GT/Vintage series
A main automobile line. It consists of various Japanese car models.
1/24 scale Itasha series
To enable modelers to create their own itasha models, these kits contain the decals of Japanese animation characters.
Dekotora (decoration Truck) series
The models of this series contain large size decal sheet for artwork, and many decoration parts such as small lights.
1/24 scale Tuned Car series
Consists of modified/tuned cars from notable in-house tuning shops such as Toyota Racing Development, Nismo, Mazdaspeed, and Ralliart. They've also included other famous aftermarket automotive companies/tuning companies such as Veilside, RE Amemiya and many more. Mainly features tuned/customized sports cars, VIP style sedans and minivans, and even low-rider/lifted pick-up trucks.
Super VIP Car Special series
Mainly focused on VIP style Japanese luxury sedans like the Toyota Crowns and Nissan Cimas.
Seibu Keisatsu
features car models used in the Japanese television drama series Seibu Keisatsu.
Initial D
Car models from manga/anime series Initial D.

=== Sci-fi vehicles ===
Movie mecha series
This line consists of vehicle models from the sci-fi movies and TV programs in the 1980s, such as 1/24 scale DeLorean time machine from Back to the Future, Knight 2000 KITT from Knight Rider, 1/48 scale Blue Thunder and Airwolf.
Thunderbirds series
This line consists of vehicle models from the 1960s British sci-fi TV series Thunderbirds. Though many of them were originally made by "Imai Kagaku", Aoshima also made some new models such as 1/144 scale Thunderbird 1 and 1/350 scale Fireflash.

=== Metal models ===
Gokin the next series
Under Miracle House brand, Aoshima is also in the die-cast model market with a series of high quality, limited release "toys" based on vehicles and ships from a variety of television, film and anime sources. Some, such as their 1/200 Thunderbirds craft and Aliens vehicles (the USCM Drop Ship and armored personnel carrier) have been released in several variations, with differences in accompanying mini-figures and paint schemes. Others, such as the Arcadia, from Matsumoto Leiji's Captain Harlock series feature internal electrics for lighting and sound effects.
Miniature car
Aoshima also produces the DISM series, a high-quality diecast range of Japanese cars from the 1970s and 1980s, in 1/43 and 1/24 scales.
Die-cast aircraft
In 2015, Aoshima began production of 1:48 scale diecast aircraft under the Skynet brand with the introduction of several A6M5 Mitsubishi Zero variants. Production has been limited to only Japanese aircraft at this time.

== General reading ==
- Nihon Puramoderu Kogyo Kyodo Kumiai, 日本プラモデル50年史 1958-2008 = The Chronicle of Japanese Plastic Models, Bungei Shunju Kikaku Shuppanbu, 2008, ISBN 978-4-16-008063-8

== See also ==
- Airfix
- AMT
- Aurora
- ESCI
- FROG
- VEB Plasticart
- Hasegawa
- Heller
- Italeri
- Jo-Han
- Matchbox
- Model Products Corporation
- Monogram
- Tamiya
- Zvezda
