= Ita-bag =

Handbag or backpack worn by anime or manga fans

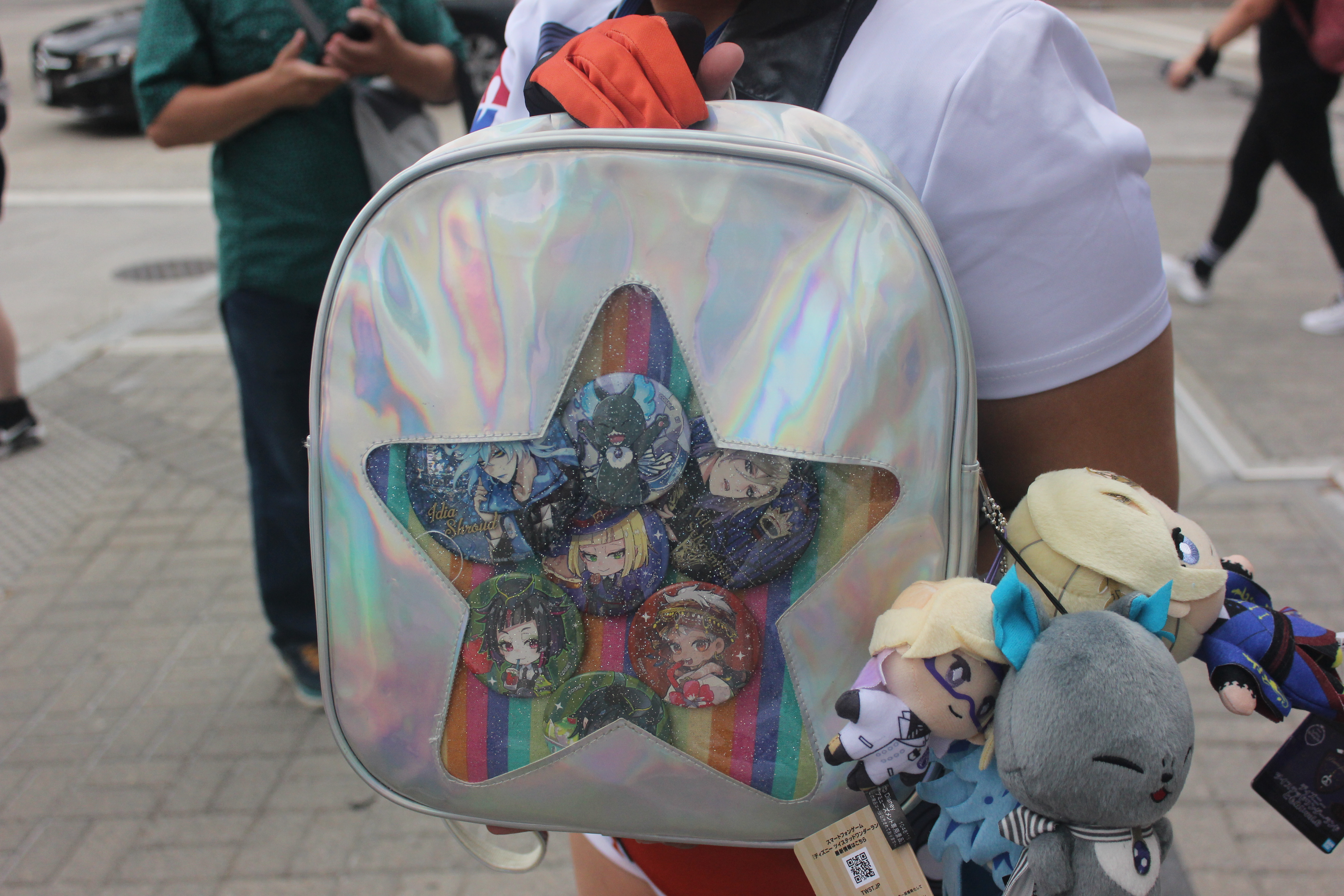
A Disney Twisted Wonderland ita-bag at Otakon 2021

An ita-bag (also ita bag or itabag; 痛バッグ, lit. 'painful bag') is a handbag, backpack or other kind of bag covered in badges, buttons, figurines and other merchandise pertaining to anime and manga fandom. In Japan, ita-bags are a popular piece of apparel among female anime and manga fans.

Ita-bags are usually designed with a transparent display window or panel that allows collectors to showcase fandom-related merchandise such as badges, acrylic stands, keychains, and plush items while carrying the bag. Collectors often customize the arrangement of displayed items according to their preferred characters, series, or themes. Ita-bags began to appear in Japanese popular culture in the 2010s, and were covered by national news beginning in 2015. They have themselves been depicted in anime, such as in Shōnen Hollywood (2014). Although usually individually put together by the owner, ita-bags can also be purchased ready-made in otaku shops. These stores also often partner with game centers to create ita-bag contests. Spread through the international anime and manga fandom, the ita-bag fashion is also growing outside Japan.

Ita-bags serve to publicly express how much their owners love a particular fictional character or media franchise. In that respect, they are the equivalent of itasha, "painmobiles", which are cars covered with fandom-themed stickers and decals. In both cases, the "pain" is in reference to the item being "painfully embarrassing" or "painful to look at" due to finding the display gaudy or cringeworthy. Some consider the "pain" in the name to also be in reference to the "pain to the owner's wallet" due to the amount of money spent, the imagined pain to the item itself, or the pain caused by the weight of carrying so many items. Ita-bags are an expensive hobby, given that some buttons are of a limited edition and command high prices. Some fans spend more than the equivalent of a thousand U.S. dollars on their ita-bags. When creating ita-bags, fans often "buy the same item many times." Ita-bag construction differs by design and manufacturer. Common components include a bag body made from textile or synthetic materials, transparent display panels, and internal attachment areas used to secure collectible items. Material choice can affect durability, appearance, flexibility, and resistance to wear over time.

== See also ==
- Battle jacket
