= Medieval Serbian literature =

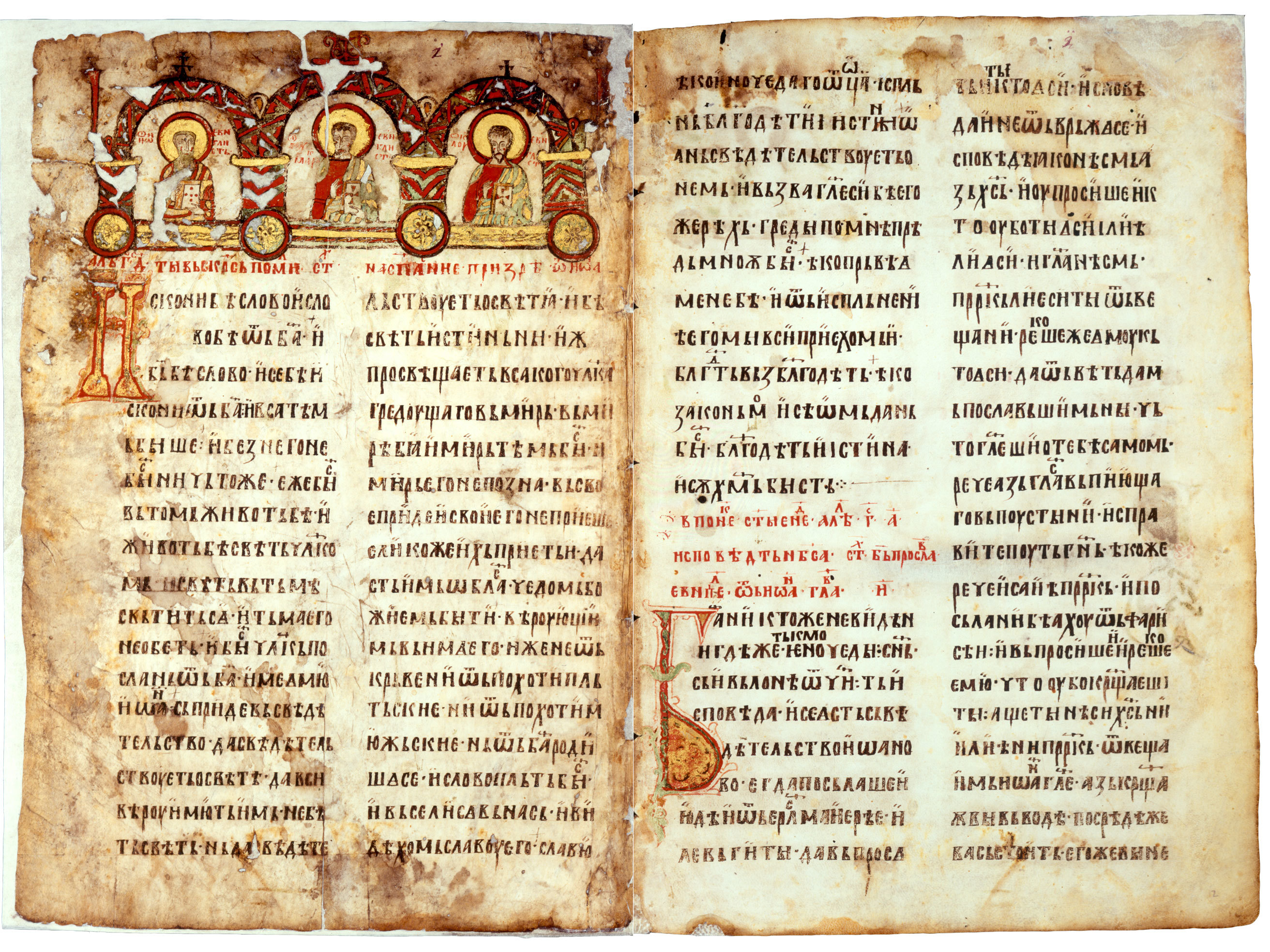
The Miroslav Gospel, a notable example of Old Serbian Cyrillic illuminated manuscript West-East art Gospel Book on parchment with very rich decorations, masterpiece of illustration and calligraphy. (Serbia's UNESCO's Memory of the World Register)

Medieval Serbian literature or Old Serbian literature (Serbian: Стара српска књижевност) refers to medieval literature of the Serbs, thus encompassing earliest periods in the history of Serbian literature. Main works of literature in Medieval Serbia were written in the Serbian Church Slavic language, a local recension of the common Church Slavic language, that was used as both liturgical and literary language among the Serbs, while the vernacular forms of the medieval Serbian language were used in various forms of practical literacy (letters, inscriptions, documents). Traditions of the Serbian medieval literature were also continued into the early modern period, up to the beginning of the 18th century.

== Origin ==
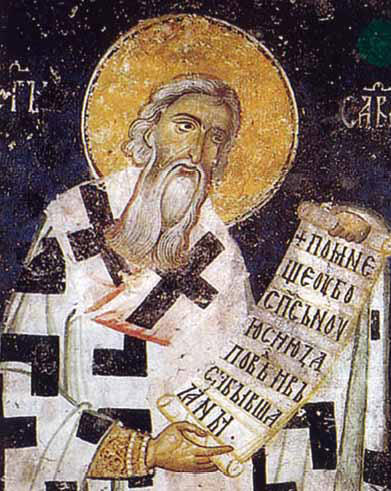
Saint Sava, one of the most prominent writers within the medieval Serbian literature

Serbian medieval literature emerged in several stages, as part of the Church Slavic literature, and was highly influenced by various models of the Byzantine literature. Main works of Christian literature were translated from Greek into Old Church Slavic by Cyril and Methodius in the 9th century, thus enabling their missionary work among Western Slavs in Great Moravia. Among South Slavs, their work was continued during the 10th century by Clement of Ohrid and his followers (Ohrid Literary School), whose influence was also spreading into Medieval Serbia.

== Development ==
Main ritual genres of the Serbian medieval literature were hagiographies, homiletics and hymnography, known in Slavic as žitije (vita), pohvala (eulogy), službe (church services), effectively meaning prose, rhetoric, and poetry. The fact that the first Slavic works were in the canonical form of ritual literature, and that the literary language was the ritual Slavic language, defined the further development. Codex Marianus represents the oldest found manuscript dating back to the 11th century, if not older, written in medieval Serbian recension of Old Slavic. Medieval Slavic literature, especially Serbian, was modelled on this classical Slavic literature. The new themes in Serbian literature were all created within the classic ritual genres.

The oldest known original work to date of Serbian medieval literature is the Legend of Vladimir and Kosara, created in the Serbian state of Duklja in the 11th century. Surviving only in excerpts and in Latin translation, it is both a love story and a heroic song about the righteous Prince Vladimir, executed unjustly in 1016 in consequence of a struggle for the throne. Thus between the 11th and 13th century, the foundations of independent Serbian literature were formed, resulting in the creation of the Old Serbian Vita (hagiographies).

In this period, the direction and character of literature was built with an elementary system of genres in its main guidelines, with a selected and modified literary language.

Only with the works of Saint Sava and the development of the autocephalous Serbian church did the Serbian literature receive the content that would make it an equal and active participant in the literary life of the Orthodox Slavic world. In the same time, the Serbian Chancellery in Dubrovnik (Ragusa) played an important role in the development of Serbian practical literacy and Serbian Cyrillic alphabet. Hence, the 13th century was not only the new but main stage in the constitution of Serbian medieval literature.

This stage ended sometime prior to the end of the century, with the ultimate standardization of the Serbian orthography in literacy and completing the creation of the main genres of the period: the Hagiography (žitije) and Divine Service (služba). The main literary centers of the early Nemanjić state were finally established by the end of the 13th century: Hilandar, Studenica, Žiča, Mileševa, Peć; in which the supply of Old Slavic general literature was filled with works of Serbian, domestic literary workshops.

In the 13th century, Serbian literature sought to reach the height of Byzantine-Slavic literature. The motive of these activities, its main driver, is in the creation of Serbian Orthodox cults, cults of the holy dynasty (the Nemanjić) and the autocephalous church. In order to enter the world of Byzantine and European civilization of the Middle Ages, it was necessary for Serbia to have its independent state and independent Church and to have its role in the general Christian culture of that time, especially participation in holiness, in a higher spiritual community, where the Serbian people was represented through "their [own] people". Its own literature was thus a necessary expression of social and national independence but at the same time integration in the spiritual ecumene of the Christian civilization through which it showed maturity and justified the political existence of the state itself on the world scale.

On this basis, all of the specificnesses of the old Serbian literature developed, as well as its universal, global identity: specificities are expressed in the creation of general genres, mostly in the hagiographical literature, i.e. the so-called "ruler historiography"; far less pronounced in hymnography, in poetry, where the canons of Byzantine poetics are quite obvious. The role of founding the father of the independent Serbian literature is held by Saint Sava, the youngest son of Grand Prince Stefan Nemanja, founder and first Archbishop of the independent Serbian Church.

With Saint Sava and others (namely Monk Simeon) there came works in the next century by prominent writers of the period, such as Domentijan and Atanasije, Grigorije II of Ras, Teodosije, Elder Grigorije, Antonije Bagaš, Lazar the Hilandarian, Pachomius the Serb, Gabriel the Hilandarian, Constantine of Kostenets, Cyprian, Metropolitan of Kiev, Gregory Tsamblak, Isaija the Monk, Grigorije of Gornjak, Rajčin Sudić, Jakov of Serres, Romylos of Vidin, Jovan the Serb of Kratovo, Gabriel of Lesnovo, Nicodemus of Tismana, Dimitar of Kratovo, Anonymous Athonite, Marko Pećki, and Demetrius Kantakouzenos.

Important texts by women poets and writers, include Jefimija, Maria Angelina Doukaina Palaiologina, Princess Milica of Serbia, Saint Angelina of Serbia, Mara Branković, Olivera Despina, Jelena Balšić, Helen of Anjou, Simonida, Katarina Branković and others. One of the most prominent writers of medieval Serbia was archbishop Danilo II (d. 1337).

The 1370s mark the beginning of the separation between Serbian Cyrillic and Latin alphabets as far as the two chancelleries in Ragusa are concerned. With the establishment of Manasija Monastery by Stefan Lazarević (d. 1427), many educated monks have gathered there. They fostered copying and literary work that by its excellence and production changed the history of the South Slavic literature and languages spreading its influence all over the Orthodox Balkans and Imperial Russia. One of the most famous scholars of the School of Rešava was Constantine the Philosopher, an influential writer and biographer of the founder of the school, Stefan Lazarević. Lazarević was by far one of the most erudite people of his time and considering his views, interests, and achievements, he was a true representative of the Serbian Renaissance.

Several philosophical works, mainly Greek (Byzantine) have also been translated into Serbian language, or adapted during the medieval period.

== Post-medieval traditions ==
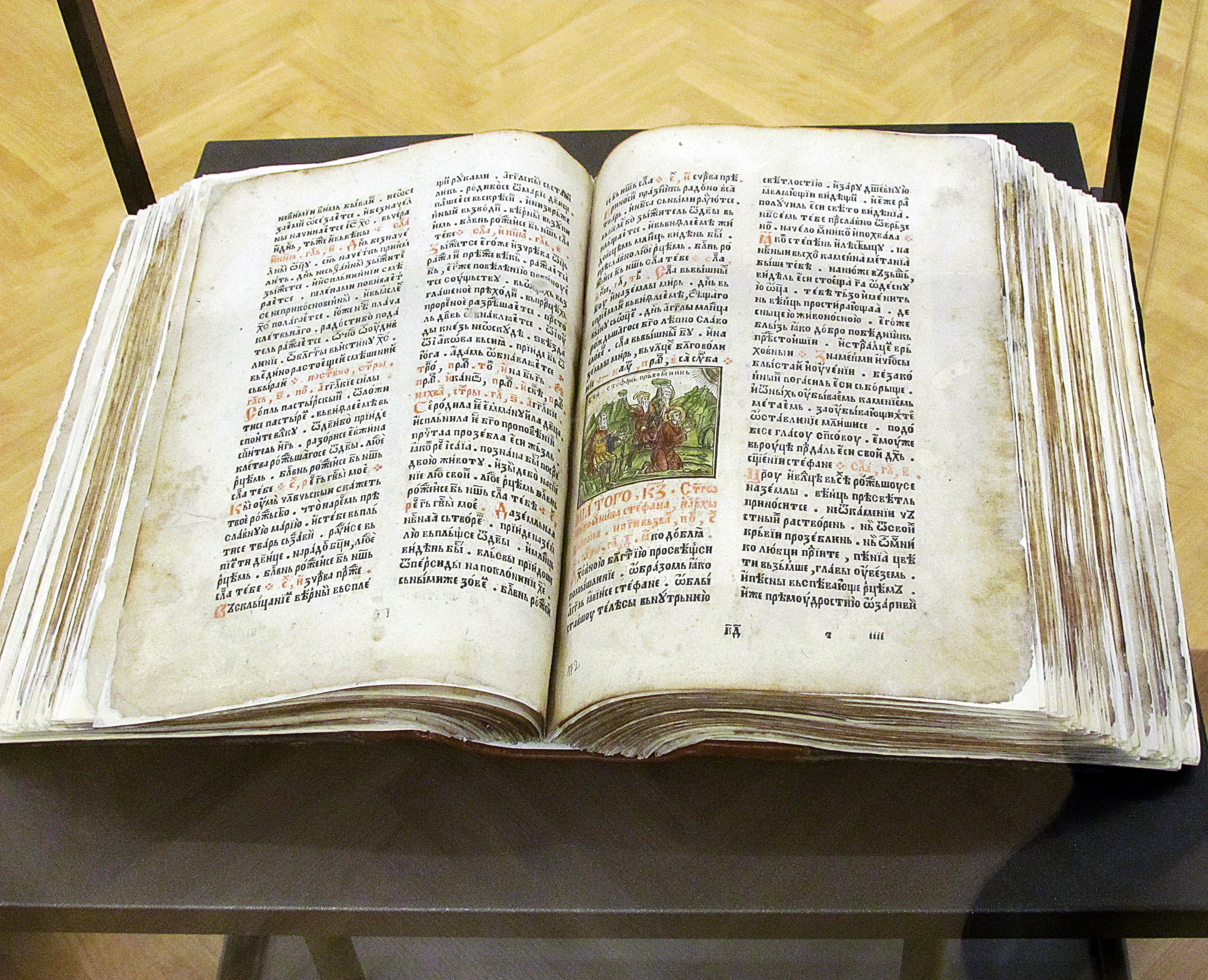
Festal Menaion, edition of the Vuković printing house (Venice, 1538)

After the Ottoman conquest of Serbia in the 15th century, traditions of the Serbian medieval literature were continued throughout the post-medieval (early modern) period, until the beginning of the 18th century. During that period, Serbian Orthodox monasteries within the Serbian Patriarchate of Peć (1557–1766) were main cultural centers, that kept the Serbian literature alive during the turbulent centuries of Ottoman occupation. Libraries and scriptoriums of Serbian monasteries were centers of learning and production of manuscripts, including theological and scholastic works such as the Old Serbian Vita (hagiographies of Serbian kings and archbishops), that were also found in both Russian and Bulgarian literary traditions. Some monasteries and major cities became centers of early Serbian printing (Cetinje, Goražde, Rujno, Gračanica, Mileševa, Belgrade, Mrkšina crkva).

Throughout the early modern period, Serbs living in the Venetian Republic, the Habsburg monarchy, and Danubian principalities (Wallachia and Moldavia) were also printing books (the Vuković printing house in Venice), and transcribing manuscripts with literary works. Those activities were conducted by Serbian literati and artisans who had escaped from their native lands when these were either threatened or occupied by the Ottomans. Their literary activities were represented by prominent individuals, such as Lazar the Serb, among the early Hilandarians to arrive in Moscow from Mount Athos; the Bulgarian-born Gregory Tsamblak who arrived from Serbia and eventually became the Metropolitan of Kiev; Pachomius the Serb, one of the representatives of a new ornamental style known as pletenie slova (word-braiding), and others.

Several authors of the Serbian Orthodox Church books worked in the Rača monastery from the 15th to 18th century, and thus are known as "the Račans". Among those, the most renowns are the illuminator hieromonk Hristifor Račanin, Teodor Račanin, Kiprijan Račanin, Grigorije Račanin, Prohor Račanin, Ćirjak Račanin, Jerotej Račanin, Simeon Račanin, Jefrem Janković Tetovac, and later Gavril Stefanović Venclović.

During the 17th century, literary influences from Kyiv-Mohyla Academy were also spreading towards the Serbian lands, effecting styles in both literature and common literacy. The most influential were works of Theophan Prokopovich and his followers from the Kievan Academy, particularly in latter part of the 17th and the beginning of the 18th century, when young Serbian artists and teachers were receiving their literary education from works printed mainly in Kiev and Moscow.

Since the beginning of the 18th century, several literary and linguistic changes occurred among Eastern Orthodox Serbs in the Habsburg Monarchy. Various influences from the earlier Russian ecclesiastical and literary reforms (known as the Nikon's reforms) were gradually accepted within the Serbian Orthodox Metropolitanate of Karlovci, thus leading to major cultural changes: Serbian redaction of the Church Slavic was gradually replaced in liturgical use by the official (synodical, or neo-Moscowian) Russian Church Slavic redaction.

Those changes also influenced the Serbian literary language: the newly introduced use of Russo-Slavic language among Serbs, combined with the old traditions of the Serbian redaction consequently led to the creation of a specific Slavonic-Serbian language (also known as Slavo-Serbian), a hybrid language that was used during the second half of the 18th century and the first half of the 19th century by Serbian educated elites, whose works belonged to new literary styles (baroque, classicism and romanticism), this marking the final departure from the old Serbian medieval literary traditions.

== Works ==
- Life of Stefan Nemanja (1208), hagiography on St. Simeon, by Archbishop Sava
- Life of St. Sava (1254), hagiography on St. Sava, by Domentijan
- Life of St. Sava (1292–1300), hagiography on St. Sava, by Teodosije
- Studenica Chronicle (1350–1400), chronicle
- Karlovac Chronicle (1418–27), chronicle
- Life of Despot Stefan Lazarević (ca. 1431), biography on Stefan Lazarević, by Constantine of Kostenets
- Koporin Chronicle (1453), chronicle, by deacon Damjan
- Dečani Chronicle (1450–1500), chronicle

== See also ==
- List of Glagolitic manuscripts
- Medieval Serbian law
- Medieval Serbian charters
- Serbian chronicles
- Serbian manuscripts
- Serbian printing
- Serbian literature

== Sources ==
- Albijanić, Aleksandar (1985). "The Demise of Serbian Church Slavic and the advent of the Slaveno-Serbski Literary Dialect". The Formation of the Slavonic literary Languages. Columbus, Ohio: Slavica Publishers. pp. 115–123.
- Albin, Alexander (1970). "The Creation of the Slaveno-Serbski Literary Language". The Slavonic and East European Review. 48 (113): 483–491.
- Birnbaum, Henrik (1972). "Byzantine Tradition Transformed: The Old Serbian Vita". Aspects of the Balkans: Continuity and Change. The Hague and Paris: Mouton. pp. 243–284.
- Bubalo, Đorđe (2014). Pragmatic Literacy in Medieval Serbia. Turnhout: Brepols. ISBN 9782503549613.
- Ćirković, Sima (2004). The Serbs. Malden: Blackwell Publishing. ISBN 9781405142915.
- Fin, Monica (2018). "Libri serbi a Venezia fra XVI e XVIII secolo". Кирило-методиевски студии. 26: 132–158.
- Grickat-Radulović, Irena (1993). "Serbian Medieval Literary Language". Serbs in European Civilization. Belgrade: Nova, Serbian Academy of Sciences and Arts, Institute for Balkan Studies. pp. 146–150. ISBN 9788675830153.
- Grković-Major, Jasmina (2021). "Serbian Church Slavonic influence on the Old Serbian language". Old Church Slavonic Heritage in Slavonic and Other Languages. Praha: Nakladatelství Lidové noviny. pp. 271–279.
- Ivanović, Miloš (2017). "Cyrillic Correspondence Between the Commune of Ragusa and Ottomans 1396-1458". State and Society in the Balkans Before and After Establishment of Ottoman Rule. Belgrade: The Institute of History. pp. 43–63. ISBN 9788677431259.
- Ivanović, Miloš (2019). "Serbian hagiographies on the warfare and political struggles of the Nemanjić dynasty (from the twelfth to the fourteenth century)" (PDF). Reform and Renewal in Medieval East and Central Europe: Politics, Law and Society. Cluj-Napoca: Romanian Academy, Center for Transylvanian Studies. pp. 103–129. Archived from the original on 2025-05-10.
- Isailović, Neven G.; Krstić, Aleksandar R. (2015). "Serbian Language and Cyrillic Script as a Means of Diplomatic Literacy in South Eastern Europe in 15th and 16th Centuries" (PDF). Literacy Experiences concerning Medieval and Early Modern Transylvania. Cluj-Napoca: George Barițiu Institute of History. pp. 185–195. Archived from the original on 2024-06-07.
- Ivić, Pavle (1995). "Standard Language as an Instrument of Culture and the Product of National History". The History of Serbian Culture. Edgware: Porthill Publishers. pp. 41–51.
- Ivić, Pavle (2024). The Serbian people and their language (PDF). Novi Sad: Matica Srpska. Archived from the original on 2025-12-29.
- Ivić, Pavle; Pešikan, Mitar (1995). "Serbian printing". The History of Serbian Culture. Edgware: Porthill Publishers. pp. 137–145.
- Janićijević, Jovan, ed. (1998). The Cultural Treasury of Serbia. Belgrade: Idea, Vojnoizdavački zavod, Markt system. ISBN 9788675470397.
- Komatina, Predrag (2015). "The Church in Serbia at the Time of Cyrilo-Methodian Mission in Moravia". Cyril and Methodius: Byzantium and the World of the Slavs. Thessaloniki: Dimos. pp. 711–718.
- Lazić, Miroslav A. (2016). "Serbian Printed Book Decoration in the 15th and 16th Centuries: Centres and Creative Production". Sacral art of the Serbian lands in the Middle Ages. Belgrade: Serbian National Committee of Byzantine Studies. pp. 485–493.
- Lazić, Miroslav A. (2018). "Venice and Editions of Early Serbian Printed Books". Thesaurismata. 48: 161–192.
- Marinković, Radmila (1995). "Medieval Literature". The History of Serbian Culture. Edgware: Porthill Publishers. pp. 53–66.
- Matejić, Mateja; Milivojević, Dragan (1978). An Anthology of Medieval Serbian Literature in English. Columbus: Slavica Publishers. ISBN 9780893570552.
- Mileusnić, Slobodan (1998). Medieval Monasteries of Serbia (4th ed.). Novi Sad: Prometej. ISBN 9788676393701.
- Milosavljević, Boris (2008). "Basic Philosophical Texts in Medieval Serbia" (PDF). Balcanica (39): 79–102. doi:10.2298/BALC0839079M.
- Paxton, Roger V. (1981). "Identity and Consciousness: Culture and Politics among the Habsburg Serbs in the Eighteenth Century". Nation and Ideology: Essays in Honor of Wayne S. Vucinich. Boulder, Colorado: East European Monographs. pp. 101–120.
- Peić, Sava (1994). Medieval Serbian Culture. London: Alpine Fine Arts Collection.
- Petković, Vesna; Peić, Sava (2013). Serbian Medieval Cultural Heritage. Belgrade: Dereta.
- Petrović, Sonja (2008). "Oral and Written Art Forms in Serbian Medieval Literature". Oral Art Forms and Their Passage Into Writing. Copenhagen: Museum Tusculanum Press. pp. 85–108. ISBN 9788763505048.
- Polomac, Vladimir R. (2025). "The Serbian language in the diplomatic correspondence of the Hungarian kings and court officials in the 15th and 16th centuries: A philological perspective" (PDF). The Eternal Cycle: neighbours, allies and/or rivals: Serbo/Hungarian relations in the Middle Ages (895–1541). Belgrade-Budapest: : The Institute of History; HUN-REN Research Centre for Humanities, Institute of History. pp. 257–279. Archived from the original on 2026-01-07.
- Stojanović, Jelica R. (2020). The development path of the Serbian language and script (PDF). Podgorica: Matica srpska. Archived from the original on 2024-08-15.
- Thomson, Francis J. (1993). "Archbishop Daniel II of Serbia: Hierarch, Hagiographer, Saint: With Some Comments on the Vitae regum et archiepiscoporum Serbiae and the Cults of Mediaeval Serbian Saints". Analecta Bollandiana. 111 (1–2): 103–134. doi:10.1484/J.ABOL.4.03279.
