= Jovan the Serb of Kratovo =

16th-century Serbian Orthodox priest

- Born: 1526; Kratovo, Sanjak of Üsküb, Ottoman Empire (present-day North Macedonia)
- Died: 1583 (aged 56–57)
- Education: Lesnovo school
- Occupations: Orthodox priest, calligraphist and scribe with an opus of at least six works
- Writing career
- Language: Serbian
- Notable work: Velika Remeta Gospel (1580)

Jovan the Serb of Kratovo (Serbian Cyrillic: Јован Србин из Кратова; 1526–1583) or Protopop Jovan (Протопоп Јован) was a Serb Orthodox priest and scribe with an opus of six works, of which one is the Velika Remeta Gospel (1580). He was a monk at Hilandar.

== Life ==
Little is known about his life. He first appears in 1526 when he transcribed a prayer book in which he is desperate about the end of the world coming in near future. Until 1569 he lived in Kratovo, at the time an important town and mining center, where he was a priest (pop). After that date we find him in Craiova in Wallachia where in 1580 he signed one Evangelion as "Priest Jovan, a Serb from the town of Kratovo" (Srbin od mesta Kratova). In Wallachia, he is also mentioned as protopop, "archpriest". Migrations of revered men of church to Wallachia were common, since there they would find patronage from Christian princes or rich landowners, a strata that did not exist in the Ottoman Empire.

Priest Jovan's work coincided with two important events. One was the renewal of the Serbian Patriarchate of Peć in 1557 that gave impetus to larger artistic production. The second was the restoration of Ottoman interest in mining, the fact that boosted production in Kratovo and other important mines. He is documented as having used eyeglasses.

== Work ==
Jovan of Kratovo is a noted illuminator associated with the circle of 16th-century Balkan artists working under the influence of Islamic ornamentation. Today there survive ten of his illuminated manuscripts and they are to be found in libraries in Belgrade, Sofia, Bucharest, and in the monasteries of Hilandar and Zographouon, Mount Athos, in Greece.

Jovan's new decorative system combined Byzantine and Islamic ornamentation in a new whole. Though he was not a skillful drawer of figures, his captions and specific floral ornamentation were noted and widely copied. He is justly credited as the creator of this new style that continued until end of the 17th century. The same style was propagated mostly by his pupils from the so-called Kratovo school.

Around 1580, he transcribed and illuminated Law on Mines of Despotes Stefan Lazarević, a collection of medieval Serbian mining regulations. This was, in all probability, an order by local authorities of Kratovo, needed to renew their production according to the wants of the Ottoman administration. In this book, Islamic influence is evident in its elongated format, the arabesque decoration on its cover, the narrow letterforms, and the design of its vignettes. The depiction of a miners’ council reproduces an earlier 15th-century original.

== Works ==
- Velika Remeta Gospel (1580)
- The Four Gospels (четворојеванђеље), held at Sofia, Bulgaria
- Mining Code transcript, held at Belgrade, Serbia

== See also ==
- Jakov of Serres
- Stanislav of Lesnovo
- Teodosije the Hilandarian (1246–1328), a recognised Serbian writer in the Middle Ages
- Elder Grigorije (fl. 1310–1355), builder of Saint Archangels Monastery
- Antonije Bagaš (fl. 1356–1366), bought and restored the Agiou Pavlou monastery
- Lazar the Hilandarian (fl. 1404), the first known Serbian and Russian watchmaker
- Pachomius the Serb (fl. 1440s–z1484), hagiographer of the Russian Church
- Miroslav Gospel
- Gabriel the Hilandarian
- Constantine of Kostenets
- Cyprian, Metropolitan of Kiev and All Rus'
- Gregory Tsamblak
- Isaija the Monk
- Elder Siluan
- Romylos of Vidin
- Atanasije (scribe)
- Rajčin Sudić
- Nicodemus of Tismana
- Dimitar of Kratovo
- Anonymous Athonite
- Stanislav of Lesnovo
- Nicodemus of Tismana
