= Elder Siluan =

14th-century Serbian Orthodox monk and poet

Siluan (Serbian Cyrillic: Силуан; fl. 14th century) was a Serbian Orthodox monk and poet who lived and worked in the Hilandar monastery at Mount Athos in the 14th century. Very little is known about him. The mystical tradition of prayer known as hesychasm left a strong imprint in Serbian medieval literature and art, which is evident already in the works of Domentijan and Teodosije the Hilandarian, but most prominently in the writings of archbishop Danilo II, patriarch Jefrem, monk Isaija and Siluan. Siluan is the author of hymns to Saint Sava and St. Simeon (Stefan Nemanja). History knows of two Serbian monks called Siluan active on Athos, living two centuries apart, but researchers have been inclined to credit the 14th century Siluan with the authorship of Verses for St. Simeon and Verses for Sava. The analyses of the two Old Serbian verbal ornaments, attributed to the 14th-century Siluan, appear in the work of Roman Jakobson; Siluan is presented as one of the most enlightened poets of his time, with an amazing ability to condense meditative philosophy into few words. His hymn to Saint Sava was printed in Venice in 1538.

== Hymn to St. Sava ==
Fleeing glory, you found glory, Sava,
There whence glory appeared to your people.
The light of faith for your people, you scorned the light,
And thereby you appeared as a beacon to all your people.
Loftiness of intelligence superseded loftiness of position,
Thereby achieving a virtue beyond intelligence.
Siluan composed these words of praise to Sava.

— Translation of Siluan's hymn by Butler 1980, p. 69

== See also ==
- Teodosije the Hilandarian (1246–1328), one of the most important Serbian writers in the Middle Ages
- Elder Grigorije (fl. 1310–1355), builder of Saint Archangels Monastery
- Marko Pećki (1360-after 1411), Serbian writer and poet
- Antonije Bagaš (fl. 1356–1366), bought and restored the Agiou Pavlou monastery
- Lazar the Hilandarian (fl. 1404), the first known Serbian and Russian watchmaker
- Pachomius the Serb (fl. 1440s–1484), hagiographer of the Russian Church
- Miroslav Gospel
- Gabriel the Hilandarian
- Constantine of Kostenets
- Cyprian, Metropolitan of Kiev and All Rus'
- Gregory Tsamblak
- Isaija the Monk
- Grigorije of Gornjak
- Atanasije (scribe)
- Rajčin Sudić
- Jakov of Serres
- Romylos of Vidin
- Nicodemus of Tismana
- Dimitar of Kratovo
- Anonymous Athonite

== Sources ==
- Matejić, Mateja; Milivojević, Dragan D. (1978). An Anthology of Medieval Serbian Literature in English. Slavica Pub. p. 70. ISBN 978-0-89357-055-2.
- Roman Jakobson (1981). Selected Writings: Poetry of Grammar, Grammar of Poetry. Walter de Gruyter. pp. 193–206. ISBN 978-90-279-3178-8.
- Butler, Thomas (1980). Monumenta Serbocroatia: a bilingual anthology of Serbian and Croatian texts from the 12th to the 19th century. Michigan Slavic Publications, Ann Arbor.
- Predrag R. Dragić Kijuk (1987). Mediaeval and Renaissance Serbian Poetry. Serbian Literary Quarterly.
