= Vladislav the Grammarian =

Bulgarian monk, scribe, historian and theologian

Vladislav the Grammarian (Bulgarian and Serbian: Владислав Граматик; fl. 1456–79) was a Bulgarian Orthodox Christian monk, scribe, historian and theologian active in medieval Bulgaria and Serbia, regarded as part of both the Bulgarian and Serbian literary corpus. His collections of manuscripts constitute a compendium of translations and original Bulgarian and Serbian texts produced between the 13th and 15th centuries.

His texts have been ordered chronologically, starting with the 1465 Collection followed by the Zagreb Collection (1469), the Adrianti Collection (1473), the Rila Panegyric (1479) and two other collections of texts compiled in the 1470s and 1480s.

== Personal life ==
Vladislav was born ca. 1420 in the village of Novo Brdo (in present-day Kosovo), in the Serbian Despotate. Novo Brdo fell to the Ottomans in 1455, and the Despotate fell by 1459. Historians assert that he received his education in the school of Constantine of Kostenets. In 1455 he moved to the village of Mlado Nagorichane, just north of Kumanovo. Vladislav spent most of his life in a monastery at the foot of the mountain Skopska Crna Gora. There is evidence that he stayed in the Rila monastery as well; there, he wrote On St. John's Relics and other works on Bulgarian patron Saint John of Rila.

Klaus Trot notes that his language bears features of Serbian speech from the vicinity of Novo Brdo. Besides reflecting Serbian phonetic features, his language also reflects Bulgarian morphological and syntactic features.

== Alleged writings ==
- A collection, which was written "in the house of Nikola Spančević, in Mlado Nagoričino" (u Nagoričinu Mladom v domu Nikole Spančevića) in the period from November 21, 1456 to November 11, 1457 (roughly a year). The last words were "Vladislav the scribe wrote this book from Novo Brdo" (Vladislav dijak pisa knjigu siju ot Novoga Brda).
- The Life of Constantine the Philosopher (1469); Khazar Polemic: 1469 version of The Life of Constantine of Thessalonica, St. Cyril, written in the ninth century. Also called the "Zagreb Collection".
- "Adrianti Collection" (1473)
- Sermons and lives of saints, St. John of Rila (d. 946) (The Story of Rila, 1479). Translation at Monastery of Matejca near Kumanovo with the help of Mara Branković (of Serbia, daughter of George Brankovic, sister of Stefan Lazarevic, known to Greeks as Maria).
- On the translation of St. John's relics in Rila Monastery.
- Narratives on Tsar Simeon's sponsorship of Greek translations and his re-installation as Knjaz at the Council of Preslav.

== Legacy ==
He is regarded as part of the literary corpus of Serbia and Bulgaria.

== See also ==
- Medieval Bulgarian literature
- Medieval Serbian literature
- Teodosije the Hilandarian (1246–1328), one of the most important Serbian writers in the Middle Ages
- Elder Grigorije (fl. 1310–1355), builder of Saint Archangels Monastery
- Antonije Bagaš (fl. 1356–1366), bought and restored the Agiou Pavlou monastery
- Lazar the Hilandarian (fl. 1404), the first known Serbian and Russian watchmaker
- Pachomius the Serb (fl. 1440s-1484), hagiographer of the Russian Church
- Miroslav Gospel
- Gabriel the Hilandarian
- Constantine of Kostenets
- Cyprian, Metropolitan of Kiev and All Rus'
- Gregory Tsamblak
- Isaija the Monk
- Elder Siluan
