= Atanasije (scribe) =

Medieval Serbian monk and scribe

Atanasije and Atanasije the Serb (Serbian Cyrillic: Атанасије; c. 1200–1265), a disciple of Saint Sava, was a Serbian monk-scribe who lived and worked in Serbia in the Middle Ages. In the 13th century, it was common for monk-scribes not to speak or write about themselves, always cognizant of the fact that their station in life was modest, focussing on the activities of their lords. It is not surprising that very little is known about him. His hymn to Saint Sava, however, has been preserved in Domentijan's biography of Saint Sava in the part describing the return of Saint Sava's relics from Trnovo, Bulgaria, to the Mileševa monastery in Raška. On that occasion, according to Domentijan, the monk-scribe Atanasije wrote and read the "Eulogy to Saint Sava".

== See also ==
- Saint Sava the founder of Serbian medieval literature
- Teodosije the Hilandarian (1246-1328), one of the most important Serbian writers in the Middle Ages
- Elder Grigorije (fl. 1310-1355), builder of Saint Archangels Monastery
- Antonije Bagaš (fl. 1356-1366), bought and restored the Agiou Pavlou monastery
- Lazar the Hilandarian (fl. 1404), the first known Serbian and Russian watchmaker
- Pachomius the Serb (fl. 1440s-1484), hagiographer of the Russian Church
- Miroslav Gospel
- Gabriel the Hilandarian
- Constantine of Kostenets
- Cyprian, Metropolitan of Kiev and All Rus'
- Gregory Tsamblak
- Isaija the Monk
- Grigorije of Gornjak
- Rajčin Sudić
- Jakov of Serres
- Romylos of Vidin
- Jovan the Serb of Kratovo
- Nicodemus of Tismana
- Dimitar of Kratovo
- Anonymous Athonite
- Marko Pećki
- John the Deacon
