= Marko Pećki =

Medieval Serbian writer

Marko Pećki (Serbian Cyrillic: Марко Пећки; 1360 in Ljevoši, near Peć in Kosovo, Serbia – after 1411 in Ljevoši, Kosovo, Serbia) was a Serbian medieval writer and poet who lived at the time of Prince Lazar of Serbia and Stefan Lazarević. He is best known for the "Life of the Serbian Patriarch Ephraim" and other biographies.

== Biography ==
Bishop Mark of Peć (hence Marko Pećki) belongs to a prominent place in the hesychast monastic hagiography from the time of Prince Lazar of Serbia and the Battle of Kosovo in 1389. He left his autobiographical data in his Letter to commemorate Gerasim and Euphemia (Jefimija).

Marko was born in 1360 in a village near Peć in Serbian Kosovo, as the youngest of four sons, born into a priestly family. We do not know his baptismal name, however, we know that all four brothers were priests. His father's secular name was probably George because he chose Gerasim as his new name for his new monastic way of life, and as Hieromonk Gerasim, he went on to build the church of St. George, where Marko's mother lived in the same cloister with Euphemia.

Dedicated to church service, Marko received a monastic designation from Serbian Patriarch Jefrem (patriarch) in 1777 when he was only seventeen, the exact age for acceptance into monastic life. Under the patriarch's spiritual guidance, Marko spent twenty-three years as a monk, educated in the Serbian Patriarchate of Peć. He was appointed Hieromonk during Jefrem's second tenure in the Patriarchate of Peć in autumn of 1389 or in the spring of 1390. That year Marko was elected bishop of Peć at the same Holy Assembly of Bishops when Danilo III Banjski (Danilo III (patriarch) was consecrated patriarch after Jefrem renounced the patriarchal see in 1390 and retired (he died in 1400).

The exact date of Marko's death is unknown.

== See also ==
- Teodosije the Hilandarian (1246–1328), one of the most important Serbian writers in the Middle Ages
- Elder Grigorije (fl. 1310 – 1355), builder of Saint Archangels Monastery
- Antonije Bagaš (fl. 1356 – 1366), bought and restored the Agiou Pavlou monastery
- Lazar the Hilandarian (fl. 1404), the first known Serbian and Russian watchmaker
- Pachomius the Serb (fl. 1440s – 1484), hagiographer of the Russian Church
- Miroslav Gospel
- Gabriel the Hilandarian
- Constantine of Kostenets
- Cyprian, Metropolitan of Kiev and All Rus'
- Gregory Tsamblak
- Isaija the Monk
- Elder Siluan
- Romylos of Vidin
- Atanasije (scribe)
- Rajčin Sudić
- Dimitar of Kratovo
- Nicodemus of Tismana
- Anonymous Athonite
- Kalist Rasoder
