= Domentijan =

Serbian writer, monk, philosopher and biographer

- Доментијан Хиландарац
- Born: 1210; Grand Principality of Serbia
- Died: 1264 (aged c. 54)
- Occupations: monk, scribe, writer, philosopher
- Writing career
- Language: Serbian Old Church Slavonic

Domentijan (Serbian Cyrillic: Доментијан; c. 1210 - after 1264), also known as Domentijan the Hilandarian (Доментијан Хиландарац), was a major figure in medieval Serbian literature and philosophy. He was a monk of the Hilandar Monastery and a contemporary of Saint Sava. In fact, he accompanied St. Sava on his visit to the Holy Land. He was highly respected by both the royal court and the monks of Mount Athos. The Athonite scribe Teodore's account of his troubles, recorded on the pages of the Hexameron (Šestodnev) of John the Exarch, which Teodore copied at Domentijan's request, contains many references to Domentijan's humanity and the help he gave him. The manuscript is now in the State Historical Museum in Moscow.

It can be concluded that Domentijan was essentially a hymnologist who wrote biographies of two Serbian saints, but in fact glorified monasticism and Christianity.

== Biography of St. Sava ==
Domentijan's biography of St. Sava, written around 1253 (and an earlier one of St. Simeon Nemanja), was expressly commissioned by the royal court of King Stefan Uroš I, seven years after Sava's death. It is an account of the life of St. Sava, but it is also an apotheosis of monasticism. Domentijan's style is characterized by fluent narration, panegyric diction, an abundance of theological and mystical elements with an emphasis on a spiritual and clearly monastic point of view. Domentijan wrote it in the kellion (cell) built by Sava in Karyes, the Athonite seat.

== Biography of St. Simeon ==
For his biography of St. Simeon, Domentijan used material from the works of earlier authors, unintentionally preserving some of them to the present day. He drew freely from the biography of Stefan Nemanja by Stefan the First-Crowned, a third of his own biography of St. Sava, and in the Panegyric to St. Simeon he used a few lines from Ilarion's Panegyric to St. Vladimir.

== Legacy ==
He is included in The 100 most prominent Serbs. Đura Daničić published Domentijan's texts in Belgrade in 1865. The Serbian Literary Guild adapted them to the modern language in 1938.

== See also ==
- John the Deacon
- Teodosije
- Danilo II, Serbian Archbishop
- Teodosije the Hilandarian (1246–1328), one of the most important Serbian writers in the Middle Ages, and the next great Athonite in the Serbian literature of the 13th century.
- Elder Grigorije (fl. 1310-1355), builder of Saint Archangels Monastery
- Antonije Bagaš (fl. 1356-1366), bought and restored the Agiou Pavlou monastery
- Lazar the Hilandarian (fl. 1404), the first known Serbian and Russian watchmaker
- Pachomius the Serb (fl. 1440s-1484), hagiographer of the Russian Church
- Miroslav Gospel
- Gabriel the Hilandarian
- Constantine of Kostenets
- Cyprian, Metropolitan of Kiev and All Rus'
- Gregory Tsamblak
- Isaija the Monk
- Grigorije of Gornjak
- Rajčin Sudić
- Romylos of Vidin
- Marko Pećki
- Grigorije Vasilije
- Danilo III (patriarch)
- Anonymous Athonite

== Sources ==
- Daničić, Đura, ed. (1865). Životi Svetog Simeuna i Svetog Save napisao Domentijan. Beograd. (old Serbian)
- Ђорђе Трифуновић (1963). Доментијан. Београд: Нолит.
- Milojević, Snežana J. (2015). "Jevanđelje u Domentijanovom Životu Svetoga Save". Zbornik Radova Filozofskog Fakulteta u Prištini. 45 (2): 63–90. doi:10.5937/zrffp45-8564.
