= Gregory of Gornjak =

Serbian Orthodox monk and saint

Grigorije of Gornjak

Venerable
- Born: early 14th century
- Died: 7 December
- Feast: 7 December
- Influences: Hesychasm

Grigorije of Gornjak (Serbian: Григорије Горњачки, Григорије из Горњака; fl. 1375–1379), also known as Grigorije the Younger (Григорије Млађи) and Grigorije the Silent (Григорије Ћутљиви), was Serbian Orthodox monk who was canonized as saint. He studied at Mount Sinai with his teachers were Gregory of Sinai and Romylos of Vidin. Together with a group of Serbian, Bulgarian and Greek monks, Grigorije returned to Moravian Serbia between 1375 and 1379. They established a strong hesychastic colony led by Grigorije. Their patron was Prince Lazar who built the Gornjak monastery for their colony. He endowed it to Grigorije and his fellow monks by written chapter, confirmed by the Serbian patriarch on 17 May 1379. Grigorije spent the rest of his life at the monastery.

== Early life ==
Grigorije, a Serb, moved from Constantinople to Paroria, a famous monastic colony in Thrace. There he met Romil and his friend Ilarion, former students of Gregory of Sinai. Romil moved from other monks in a separate cottage for a period of five years and then to Mount Sinai, while Grigorije remained under mentorship of Ilarion.

== At Mount Sinai ==
When Ilarion died Grigorije also moved to Mount Sinai where he became a student of Roman who would later be known as Saint Romil (Romylus) of Ravanica. Grigorije of Gornjak is author of the hagiography of Romil of Ravanica. Grigorije of Gornjak is also referred to as Sinait because he was also a monk at Mount Sinai. Because of the Ottoman expansion they decided to leave Mount Sinai.

== Return to Moravian Serbia ==
After 1375 Grigorije of Gornjak, Romil of Ravanica, Roman and several members of their hesychast brotherhood arrived in Moravian Serbia and put themselves under the protection of Prince Lazar. They participated in establishing a strong hesyastic colony consisting of Serbian, Bulgarian and Greek monks who came from Mount Sinai.

According to the legends, Prince Lazar was hunting near river Mlava when he noticed monk Grigorije on the other side of the river. Lazar tried to talk to Grigorije, but without success because of the noise of the river. Grigorije silenced the river to be able to talk with Lazar and since that day Mlava does not make much noise at that place.

By charter issued by Prince Lazar at the beginning of 1379, Grigorije was endowed with the Monastery of Gornjak. The charter stipulated that monastery will be governed by Grigorije's fellow monks after his death. Grigorije took this charter to Peć to Serbian patriarch Spiridon who confirmed it on 17 May 1379. Romil stayed near Ravanica Monastery while Grigorije spent the rest of his life in Gornjak monastery in which he was buried. In 16th and 17th century his remnants were moved to Oreškovica monastery before they were returned to Gornjak.

Grigorije of Gornjak was canonized and church service in his honour is held on the day of his death, a day after Saint Nicholas day, on 7 December.

== See also ==
- List of Serbian saints
- Teodosije the Hilandarian (1246-1328), one of the most important Serbian writers in the Middle Ages
- Elder Grigorije (fl. 1310–1355), builder of Saint Archangels Monastery
- Antonije Bagaš (fl. 1356–1366), bought and restored the Agiou Pavlou monastery
- Lazar the Hilandarian (fl. 1404), the first known Serbian and Russian watchmaker
- Pachomius the Serb (fl. 1440s-1484), hagiographer of the Russian Church
- Miroslav Gospel
- Gabriel the Hilandarian
- Constantine of Kostenets
- Cyprian, Metropolitan of Kiev and All Rus'
- Gregory Tsamblak
- Isaija the Monk
- Atanasije (scribe)
- Rajčin Sudić
- Elder Siluan
- Nicodemus of Tismana
- Anonymous Athonite

== Sources ==
- Mileusnić, Slobodan (1997). Medieval monasteries of Serbia. Pravoslavna reč. ISBN 978-86-7639-294-0.
