= Anonymous Athonite =

Author and biographer of Isaija the Monk

Anonymous Athonite (also known in Serbia as Nepoznati Svetogorac; late 14th to mid-15th century) was Isaija the Monk's biographer and one of the many unidentified authors of Medieval works. It is assumed that he wrote "The Life of the Elder Isaiah" (Isaija) in the Russian monastery of St. Panteleimon Monastery on the Holy Mountain (Mount Athos), shortly after the death of Isaiah. He was known to be well acquainted with various moments of the youth and monastic life of Isaiah, being his contemporary and perhaps his colleague or disciple as well. The text is derived from a transcript dating 15th century, located at Hilandar Monastery. Another work attributed to him was the translation of the Books of Kings, in 1415.

== See also ==
- Lazarević dynasty
- Battle of Kosovo
- Jefimija
- Princess Milica of Serbia
- Stefan Lazarević
- Teodosije
- Danilo II, Serbian Archbishop
- Stefan Dušan
- Elder Siluan
- Teodosije the Hilandarian (1246–1328), one of the most important Serbian writers in the Middle Ages, and the next great Athonite in the Serbian literature of the 13th century.
- Elder Grigorije (fl. 1310–1355), builder of Saint Archangels Monastery
- Antonije Bagaš (fl. 1356–1366), bought and restored the Agiou Pavlou monastery
- Lazar the Hilandarian (fl. 1404), the first known Serbian and Russian watchmaker
- Pachomius the Serb (fl. 1440s–1484), hagiographer of the Russian Church
- Miroslav Gospel
- Gabriel the Hilandarian
- Constantine of Kostenets
- Cyprian, Metropolitan of Kiev and All Rus'
- Gregory Tsamblak
- Isaija the Monk
- Grigorije of Gornjak
- Radoslav's Gospel
- Rajčin Sudić
- Jakov of Serres
- Romylos of Vidin
- Marko Pećki
- Grigorije Vasilije
- Danilo III (patriarch)
- Isaija the Monk
- Jefrem (patriarch)
