= Gabriel the Hilandarian =

15th-century Serbian Orthodox monk and scribe

Gabriel the Hilandarian (c. 1359–d. after 1412) was a Serbian monk-scribe. There is very little information available about Gabriel the Hilandarian, like most modest monks who lived in the 14th and early 15th century. It is known that he translated Olympiodorus the Younger's commentary on the Book of Job from Greek in 1411–12. The manuscript is now held at the State Historical Museum in Moscow.

In his younger days, Gabriel resided and worked at the Resava (Manasija) Monastery, built between 1407 and 1418 by Despot Stefan Lazarević. According to Constantine of Kostenets, Resava was built specifically as a centre for the followers of the Hesychasm movement, showing that Stefan held them in great esteem. Stefan endowed Resava generously with icons and books, and established a scriptorium and a translation school within the monastery. Old texts were corrected and copied and many were translated from Hebrew, Greek, Old Armenian, Old Georgian, Coptic, Syriac, and Old Latin. Among notable translators were Gabriel; Anonymous monk (Books of Kings, in 1411–12); the monk Jacob (Hexaemeron of John Chrysostom, first book, in 1425–26); Venedikt Crepović (Hexaemeron of John Chrysostom, second book, in 1425–26); and priest Panareta. During that time, translators made technical improvements in texts while they were being translated. Most of the scribes working in the scriptorium after completing their apprenticeship left for other monasteries in the then Serbian Empire.

== See also ==
- Teodosije the Hilandarian (1246–1328), one of the most important Serbian writers in the Middle Ages
- Elder Grigorije (fl. 1310–1355), builder of Saint Archangels Monastery
- Antonije Bagaš (fl. 1356–1366), bought and restored the Agiou Pavlou monastery
- Lazar the Hilandarian (fl. 1404), the first known Serbian and Russian watchmaker
- Pachomius the Serb (fl. 1440s–1484), hagiographer of the Russian Church
- Miroslav Gospel
- Cyprian, Metropolitan of Kiev and All Rus'
- Gregory Tsamblak
- Isaija the Monk
- Elder Siluan
- Jovan the Serb of Kratovo
- Nicodemus of Tismana
- Dimitar of Kratovo
- Marko Pećki

== Sources ==
- Đurin, Tatjana (2014). "Three Monks and a Philosopher: Religious Men Travelling and Translating in Medieval Serbia". In Federici, F.; Tessicini, D. (eds.). Translators, Interpreters, and Cultural Negotiators: Mediating and Communicating Power from the Middle Ages to the Modern Era. Springer. pp. 10–28. ISBN 978-1-137-40004-8.
- Grickat (1972).
- Nedeljković (1972).
