= Gregory of Sinai =

Greek Christian saint (c. 1260s – 1346)

Saint
- Born: c. 1260s Smyrna (modern-day İzmir, Turkey)
- Died: 1346; Paroria, Bulgaria
- Honored in: Eastern Orthodoxy
- Feast: 8 August

Gregory of Sinai, or in Serbian and Bulgarian Grigorije Sinaita (c. 1260s – 27 November 1346), was a Greek Christian monk and writer from Smyrna. He was instrumental in the emergence of hesychasm on Mount Athos in the early 14th century.

== Biography ==
Born in Smyrna, he was captured by Seljuk Turks as a young man, and eventually ransomed to Cyprus, whence he became a monk at Saint Catherine's Monastery in the Sinai Peninsula. Later, he moved to Crete, where he learned the practices of hesychasm from a monk named Arsenios. In 1310, he went to Mount Athos, where he remained until 1335. At Mount Athos, he was a monk at the Skete of Magoula near Philotheou Monastery. Increasing Muslim raids on Athos pushed Gregory and some disciples into the Bulgarian Empire, where he would find protection under Bulgarian Emperor Ivan Alexander. He went on to found a monastery near Paroria, located in the Strandzha Mountains of southeast Bulgaria.

Gregory's disciples also included Nicodemus of Tismana, Patriarch Kallistos I of Constantinople (who wrote a life of Gregory c. 1351), Romylos of Vidin, Theodosius of Tarnovo, Gregory of Sinai the Younger, and Gerasimos of Euripos.

He died on 27 November 1346 in the mountains of Paroria, near present-day Zabernovo, Bulgaria.

== Philokalia ==
The Philokalia includes five works in Greek by Gregory:

- On Commandments and Doctrines, Warnings and Promises; on Thoughts, Passions, and Virtues, and also on Stillness and Prayer: 137 Texts
- Further Texts
- On the Signs of Grace and Delusion, Written for the Confessor Longinos: Ten Texts
- On Stillness: Fifteen Texts
- On Prayer: Seven Texts

== See also ==
- Athanasius the Meteorite
- Constantine of Kostenets
- Cyprian, Metropolitan of Kiev
- Gregory Tsamblak
- Grigorije of Gornjak
- Grigorije Vasilije
- Isidore I of Constantinople
- Roman of Đunis

== Bibliography ==
- Beyer, Hans-Veit, ed. (2006). Каллист I, патриарх Константинополя. Житие и деятельность иже во святых отца нашего Григория Синаита [Kallistos I, Patriarch of Constantinople: Life and Works of Our Holy Father Gregory of Sinai] (PDF) (in Russian). Ekaterinburg: Ural Federal University Press. ISBN 5-7525-1484-3. (a critical edition of the Greek text)
