= Inok of Dalša =

Serbian writer and translator

Inok of Dalša (Serbian: Инок из Далше; from the first half of the 15th century) was an anonymous Serbian writer and translator.

== Life and work ==
At the invitation of the despot Stefan Lazarević, he came from Mount Athos to Serbia and settled in the Dalša Monastery, where he transcribed books ("The Gospel of Radoslav" and "The Four Gospels", both from 1429). He left an autobiographical record of the suffering during the Turkish invasion after the despot's death (around 1428/29), impressively and vividly written, without rhetorical embellishment, valuable both as a literary work and as a document of his time. He is also the author of "Istorikije" (1438?), A very short chronicle, i.e. "The beginning of the chronicle", with a Serbian chronicle which covered the events of 1348 to 1438.

A Serbian Gospel book of the painter Radoslav from 1429 with a colophon by the monk (inok) from Dalša monastery was found by Porphrius Uspenski in the nineteenth century during his visit to a library at Agiou Pavlou (St. Paul's Monastery) in the monastic state of Mount Athos.

== Translation into modern Serbian ==
- Inok iz Dalše u prepisanome jevanđelju , in: "Stari srpski zapisi i natpisi", priredio prof. dr Milorad Pavić, Belgrade, Prosveta, SKZ, 1986. Biblioteka Stara srpska književnost u 24 knjige, knj. 24, p. 116–122;
- isto (excerpt), Srpska autobiografska književnost (collection of papers of the 27th scientific meeting of Slavists in Vuk Karadžić day), Belgrade – Novi Sad – Manasija, 2—13 September 1997, Belgrade, International Slavic Center, 1998, 5—14.

== See more ==
- "Inok and Despot" – a novel about Inok of Dalša based on the medieval manuscript of "Radoslav's Gospel".

== Literature ==
- Dimitrije Bogdanović: "History of Old Serbian Literature", Belgrade, SKZ, 1980.
- Đorđe Trifunović: "A Brief Review of Yugoslav Literature of the Middle Ages", Belgrade, Faculty of Philology, University of Belgrade, 1976.
- Dejan Mihailović: "Byzantine Circle (Small Dictionary of Early Christian Literature in Greek, Byzantine and Old Serbian Literature)", Belgrade, "Institute for Textbooks", 2009, p. 78.
