= Gregory of Sinai the Younger =

Saint Gregory of Sinai, the Younger (Serbian: Григорије Синајски Млађи; late 13th- and early 14th-century) was the founder of Gregoriou Monastery at Mount Athos. The Serbian Orthodox Church as well as all the other co-religionist national churches celebrate his altar feast date of 7 December each year.

== Biography ==
Gregory of Sinai the Younger was born sometime after the 1260s in Serbia according to his hagiographers. Although the exact date of his birth is unspecified, some hagiographers indicate that he was born between 1253 and 1258 in Serbia at a time when emigrant monks arrived in droves from the Middle East via Constantinople and Mount Athos after the Mongol hordes invaded Egypt and Syria. Other sources say that Gregory was born most likely a decade later after the middle of the 13th century, sometime in the 1260s. Information related to the early life of Gregory is scanty. However, the few available sources agree that he was born at the time of Prince Lazar's Serbia. The reason for the scarcity of information about him maybe because the oldest-known source about this time period was written a hundred years after his death. That explains the very little hermaneia (an interpretation of what has been spoken more or less obscurely by others) about him but what is interesting that he did exist testified by Gregoriou Monastery that he bequeathed to the monastic state of Mount Athos. It is known as a young man that he fell in love with learning and the Church being the bastion of knowledge that provided him with manuscripts and books. He eventually traveled throughout the holy places both near and far. It was then that he espoused a hesychast philosophy, popular at the time. Like his namesake of a generation past, he avoided church polemics and controversies and preached peace and meditation wherever he went. That garnered him, followers, and disciples. Today still little is known about him except that his theological beliefs were in tandem with the Hesychast doctrine of Sinai's theology.

== Works ==
He is remembered as the author of the Life of Gregory of Sinai, the Senior, his spiritual mentor.

As a young disciple of St. Gregory of Sinai, he also wrote about St. Romylos of Vidin.
