= Paul of Xeropotamou =

9th-10th century Byzantine ascetic

Saint Paul of Xeropotamou
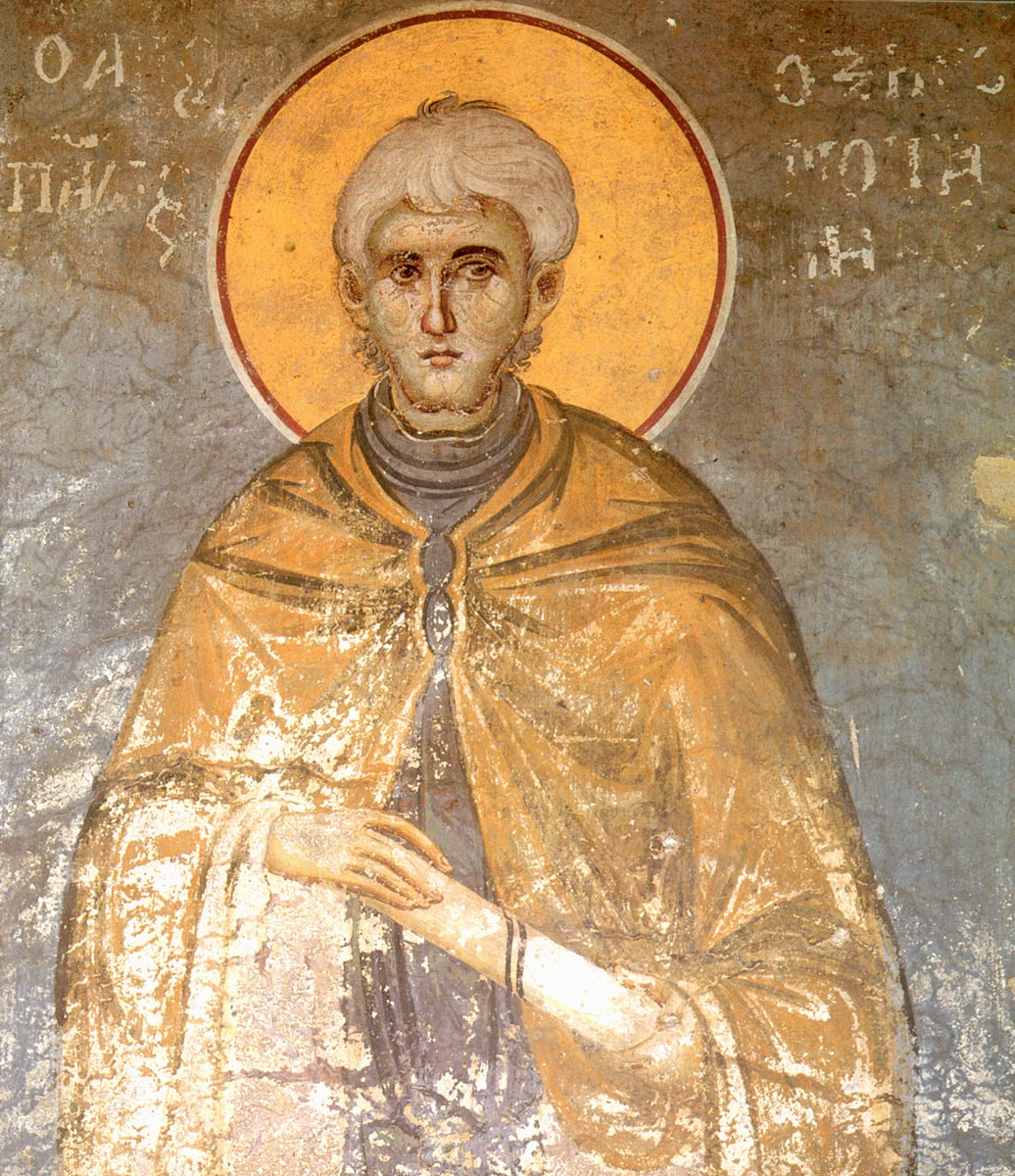
- Died: Mount Athos, Greece
- Venerated in: Eastern Orthodox Church
- Canonized: Pre-congregation
- Feast: 28 July

Paul of Xeropotamou (Ancient Greek: Παῦλος ὁ Ξηροποταμινός) was a Byzantine ascetic, lived between the 9th and the 10th century on Mount Athos, where he also restored and founded monasteries. He is commemorated in the Orthodox Church and his feast day is on 28 July.

== Life ==
The monk Paul of Xeropotamou, born Procopius, allegedly was the son of a Byzantine Emperor, which some sources anachronistically name as Michael I Rangabe. Having received a brilliant education, Procopius was one of the most learned people of his time. His works on the Presentation of Mary, the canon of the Forty Martyrs, the canon of the Holy Cross and other works earned him well-deserved fame. But scholarship and an honourable position in the world did not entice Procopius.

There are scholars who describe St. Paul as a eunuch. This is supported by his iconographic depiction, where he is rendered as a white-haired old man without beard, thing that contrasts with the monks' deep-seated custom of keeping long beards, but that is compatible with a castration before or around puberty, as was usual for eunuchs and also for the sons of deposed emperors, as happened with the deposition of Michael I Rangabe, whose sons were allowed to live in monasteries after having been castrated, as imposed by Leon V the Armenian.

=== Xeropotamou Monastery ===
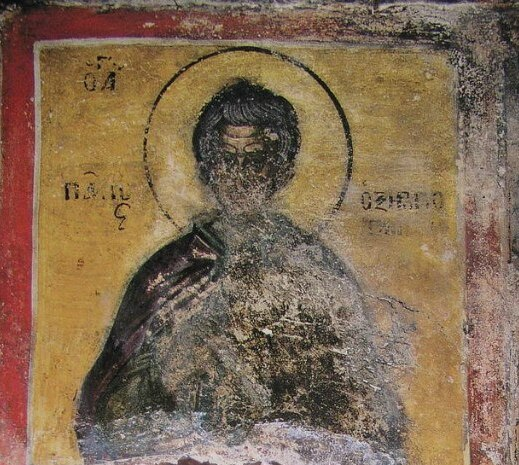
Fresco from Dionysiou Monastery

Leaving everything worldly, replacing his rich clothes with beggar's rags, he went to Mount Athos, the Holy Mountain. In the place called Xeropotamou (Greek: Ξηροποτάμου, dry river), he built himself a cell in the ruins of a monastery once founded by the empress Pulcheria in honour of the Forty Martyrs. Procopius was tonsured monk by a hermit named Cosmas and he took the name Paul. Out of humility, the monk did not reveal his erudition to anyone. Through his strict life, Paul quickly became famous throughout the Holy Mountain. He became known as Paul of Xeropotamou, and the monastery where he worked is still called Xeropotamou to this day.

When the Emperor Romanos, a relative of St. Paul, took the throne, he urged the saint to come to Constantinople through the Protos of the Holy Mountain and arranged a magnificent meeting for him. The humble Paul, not betraying his monastic duty, appeared among the courtly splendour and magnificence with a cross and in his tattered rason. Saint Paul reaffirmed that his glory was chosen by God by laying his hands on the Emperor Romanos who had been seriously ill, and miraculously healing him. But the allures of court life, promised by the grateful emperor, did not deceive the saint, and he returned to the Holy Mountain, having asked the emperor only one favour - to restore the Xeropotamou monastery.

Upon the restoration of the monastery, at the consecration of its cathedral, a portion of the True Cross was set on the holy altar, a gift from the Emperor Romanos to St. Paul.

=== Agiou Pavlou Monastery ===
Soon the Xeropotamou monastery was filled with a multitude of monks who wanted to come under the obedience of the holy ascetic, but the monk Paul, having entrusted the direction of the monastery to one of the fathers, retired to a remote hermitage. His strict silence was again broken by the disciples who did not want to leave their elder. Around 980, the Monk asked the emperor for a new monastery. This was the foundation of Saint George’s monastery named after Saint George, later renamed after the saint himself as St. Paul's monastery. The first rector of the new monastery was the venerable Paul himself, who also brought particles of the True Cross to this new monastery.

The saint who had been informed in advance of his death, called to himself the fathers of Xeropotamou and the new St. George's monastery and gave them their last instruction. On the day of his death, St. Paul put on his mantle, read the prayer of St. Ioannikios the Great, which he constantly said: "My hope is the Father, my refuge is the Son, my protection is the Holy Spirit: O Holy Trinity, glory to Thee," and communed of the Holy Mysteries of Christ.

St. Paul was the leading figure of the group of hermits at Mount Athos and he mobilized these ascetics to counter organized monasticism. Particularly, he was the primary opponent of Athanasius and his monastic proposals, accusing him of bringing worldly ways at Athos while also highlighting his exploitation of the hermits.

St. Paul had instructed that his body should be buried on the peninsula of Longos opposite the Holy Mountain. However, by the will of God, the waves pushed the ship all the way to the shores of Constantinople, where the Emperor and the Patriarch of Constantinople reverently accepted the body of the saint and solemnly laid him in the Hagia Sophia. After the sack of Constantinople by the Crusaders, the relics of St. Paul were transferred to Venice.
