= Teodosije =

Teodosije (Serbian Cyrillic: Теодосије) is a Serbian variant of the Greek name Theodosius, and may refer to:

- Teodosije Hilandarac (1246-1328), cleric and writer
- Teodosije, Metropolitan of Zeta (before 1446)
- Teodosije, Bishop of Vršac (1672)
- Teodosije Mraović, Metropolitan of Belgrade (1883-1889)
- Teodosije Šibalić (1963- ), Serbian Bishop of Raška-Prizren

== See also ==
- Teodosić, surname
