= Hilandar Fragments =

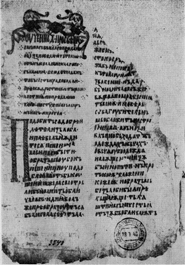
- Writing: Cyrillic script
- Created: late 10th to early 11th century
- Discovered: 1844
- Present location: Odessa

Hilandar Fragments are a medieval Old Church Slavonic manuscript from the end of the 10th and the beginning of the 11th century. It is one of the oldest preserved Slavic monuments written in Cyrillic script.

Hilandar Fragments contain two sheets and are parts of a sermon Saint Cyril of Jerusalem (318-395). They were discovered in 1844 in Hilandar monastery. Viktor I. Gligorovich donated them to the Novoruska State Library in Odessa - today Odessa University, where they are still kept.

== Sources ==
- Ст. Кульбакин, Хилендарские листки. Отрывок кирилловской письменности XI века, in: Памятники старославянского языка, том 1, Санкт Петербург, 1900
