= Radoslav's Gospel =

1429 manuscript by Radoslav and Feodor

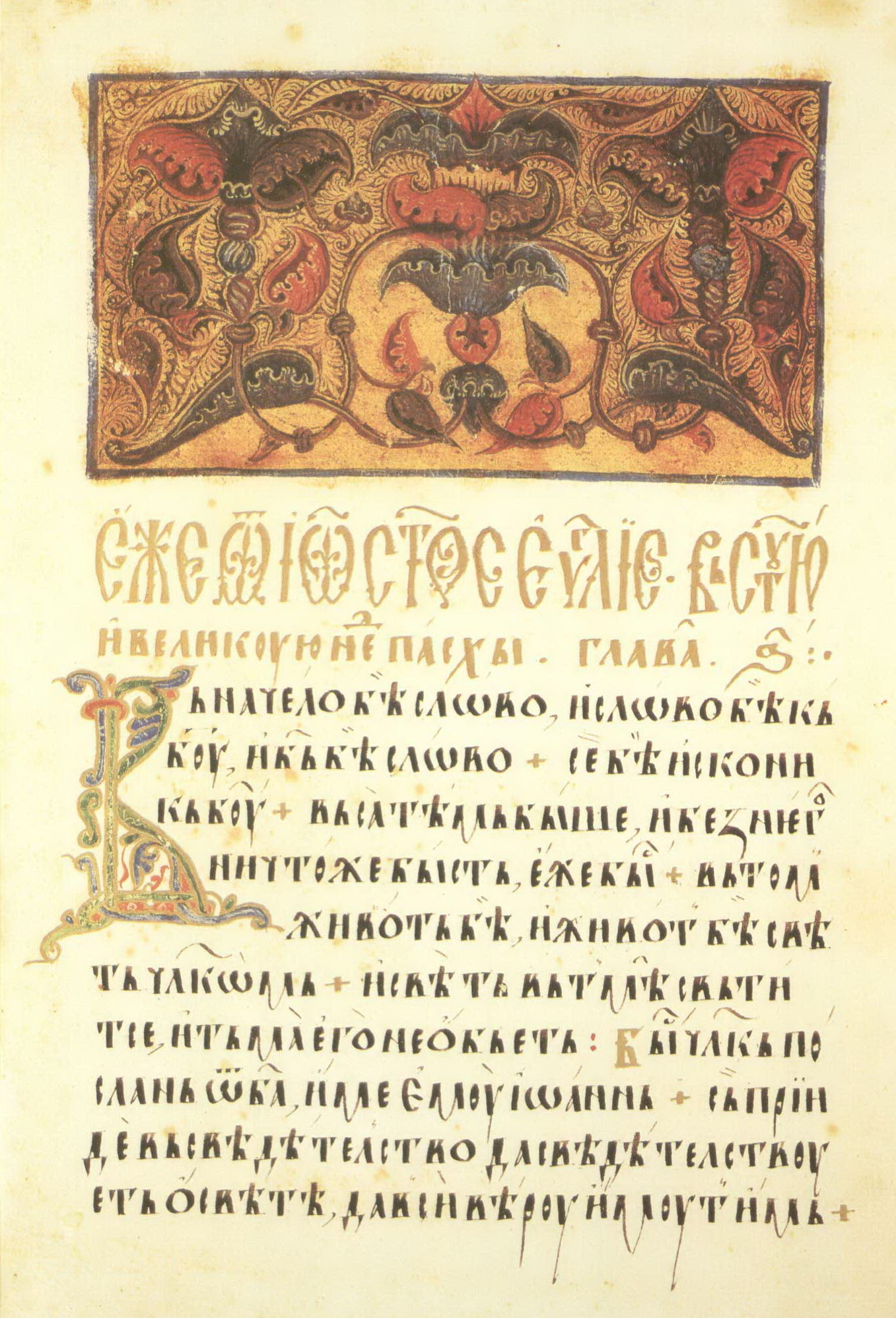
- Created: 1429

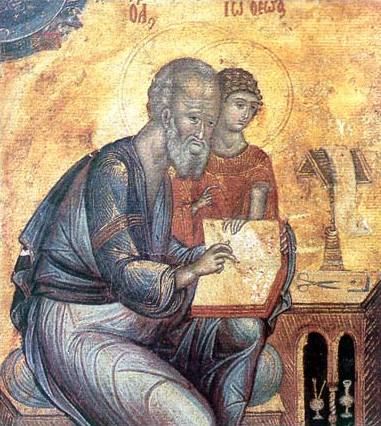
Saint John folio

Radoslav's Gospel (also known as Leningrad Serbian Gospel, Gospel of the Spiritual Visarion, and Tetraevangelion of Inok from Dalša) was created in 1429 by miniaturist Radoslav and celibate priest Teodor, a Serbian monk-scribe from Dalša. It contains a number of miniatures, including "An Evangelist Portrait". The gospels are in the Russian National Library, St. Petersburg. In 2001 it was republished by the National Library of Serbia and the Central Bank of Yugoslavia as part of the Svetilnik series.

== See also ==
- List of medieval Serbian literature
