= Antonije Bagaš =

Serbian nobleman and Orthodox Christian abbot

Antonije Bagaš - Arsenije
- Born: Kostur
- Buried: Agiou Pavlou
- Family: Bagaš
- Occupation: Orthodox Christian abbott

Anthony Bagaš, also known as Arsenije Bagaš (Serbian: Антоније Багаш; fl. 1366–1385), was a Serbian nobleman from Kastoria who retreated to Mount Athos in between 1356 and 1366, where he later bought and restored the ruined Athonite monastery of Saint Paul (Agiou Pavlou) with the help of Nikola-Gerasim Radonja (the son of sebastokrator Branko Mladenović) in the 1380s, becoming its abbott and taking the monastic name Arsenios (Arsenije). The two were successful in receiving donations from both the Byzantines and Serbs, and refurbishing the monastery with revenue from Serbian silver and gold mines, making it one of the major Serbian monasteries. He translated hagiographical works into Serbian.

He had a brother, Nikola, who in 1385 donated the monastery of Mesonesiotissa near Edessa, together with villages, churches and other property to the Saint Paul monastery of Arsenije. Some scholars believe that the Bagaš family was originally from Vranje in Serbia while some other scholars believe that historical sources do not confirm it.

== See also ==
- Teodosije the Hilandarian (1246-1328), one of the most important Serbian writers in the Middle Ages
- Elder Grigorije (fl. 1310–1355), builder of Saint Archangels Monastery
- Elder Siluan
- Lazar the Hilandarian (fl. 1404), the first known Serbian and Russian watchmaker
- Pachomius the Serb (fl. 1440s-1484), hagiographer of the Russian Church
- Miroslav Gospel
- Gabriel the Hilandarian
- Constantine of Kostenets
- Cyprian, Metropolitan of Kiev and All Rus'
- Gregory Tsamblak
- Isaija the Monk
- Grigorije of Gornjak
- Atanasije (scribe)
- Rajčin Sudić
- Nicodemus of Tismana

== Notes ==
1. Name: Serbian: Antonije Bagaš (also Pagaš), Greek: Antonios Pagases, Anglicized: Anthony. His monastic name is Arsenije, Greek: Arsenios.

== Sources ==
- Jan Olof Rosenqvist, Interaction and isolation in late Byzantine culture, Google book
- Pavlikianov, Cyril (2001). The Medieval Aristocracy on Mount Athos: Philological and Documentary Evidence for the Activity of Byzantine, Georgian and Slav Aristocrats and Eminent Churchmen in the Monasteries of Mount Athos from the 10th to the 15th Century. Sofia: Center for Slavo-Byzantine Studies. ISBN 9789540715957.
- Angold, Eastern Christianity Michael Angold
- Through the looking glass: Byzantium through British eyes : papers from the twenty-ninth Spring Symposium of Byzantine Studies, London, March 1995, p. 141
