= Pachomius the Serb =

15th-century Serbian hagiographer

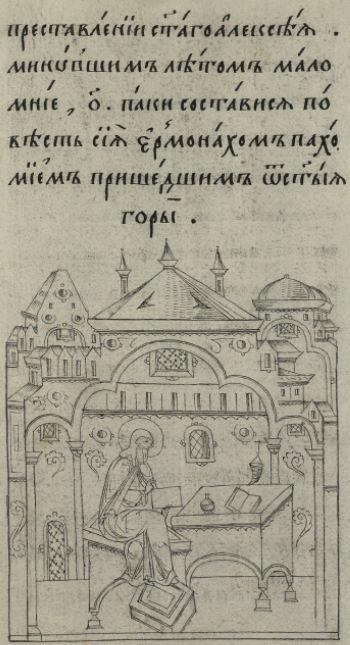
- Pachomius writes the Life of St. Alexius
- Born: Пахомије early 15th century
- Died: 1484
- Other names: Pachomius Logothetes
- Occupations: Hagiographer; hymnwriter; translator

Pachomius the Serb (Russian: Пахомий Серб; Serbian: Пахомије Србин), also known as Pachomius Logothetes (Russian: Пахомий Логофет; Greek: Παχώμιος Λογοθέτης), was a 15th-century Serbian hagiographer who, after taking monastic vows, was schooled on Mount Athos and mastered the ornate style of medieval Serbian literature. He is credited by the Russian Early Texts Society for the Serbian version of Barlaam and Josaphat from Old Greek.

In the 1450s and 1460s he resided at the Trinity Monastery of St. Sergius north of Moscow. One of his major undertakings was a Russian translation of the New Testament. In about 1470 Archbishop Jonah (Iona) asked him to settle in Novgorod where he prepared a set of the lives of local saints. It has been suggested that The Tale of the Princes of Vladimir was also authored by Pachomius.

== Life ==
He arrived in Novgorod at the end of the 1430s or beginning of the 1440s, during the archiepiscopate of Euthymius II of Novgorod (1429–1458) and, under Euthymius' aegis, he composed the Life of Barlaam of Khutyn, the founder of the Khutyn Monastery, as well as the "Tale of the Journey of John (Archbishop Elias of Novgorod in 1165-1186) on a Devil to Jerusalem." He then travelled to the Troitse-Sergiyeva Lavra north of Moscow, where he composed the Life of Sergius of Radonezh, the founder of that monastery. He returned to Novgorod under Archbishop Jonah (1458–1470) and composed the Lives of several Novgorodian bishop-saints, including those of Elias (John) and Euthymius II. He later composed the Life of Archbishop Moses of Novgorod sometime shortly after 1484. He died sometime thereafter.

== Works ==
Pachomius is believed to have written eleven saint's lives (zhitie), including those of Metropolitan Peter of Moscow, Stephen of Perm, Elias (John) of Novgorod, Moses of Novgorod, Euthymius II of Novgorod, Jonah of Novgorod, Prince Michael of Chernigov, Barlaam of Khutyn, Sergius of Radonezh, and others. He also wrote fourteen services, including those for Euthymius II, The Our Lady of the Sign in Novgorod, Metropolitan Alexius of Moscow, Anthony of Kiev, and Metropolitan Jonah of Moscow.

== Legacy ==
A Serbian Orthodox Church monastery is named after him in Greenfield, Missouri.

== See also ==
- Lazar of Hilandar (also known as Lazar the Serb)
- Teodosije the Hilandarian (1246–1328), one of the most important Serbian writers in the Middle Ages
- Elder Grigorije (fl. 1310–1355), builder of Saint Archangels Monastery
- Antonije Bagaš (fl. 1356–1366), bought and restored the Agiou Pavlou monastery
- Lazar the Hilandarian (fl. 1404), the first known Serbian and Russian watchmaker
- Elder Siluan
- Miroslav Gospel
- Gabriel the Hilandarian
- Constantine of Kostenets
- Cyprian, Metropolitan of Kiev and All Rus'
- Gregory Tsamblak
- Isaija the Monk
- Kir Stefan the Serb
- Grigorije of Gornjak
- Stanislav of Lesnovo
- Hieromonk Pahomije
- Atanasije (scribe)
- Rajčin Sudić
- Dimitar of Kratovo
