= Nicodemus of Tismana =

Orthodox Christian monk

Saint Nicodemus of Tismana
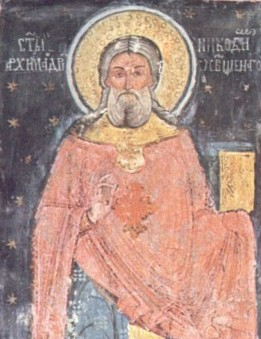

The Sanctified
- Born: c. 1320; Prilep
- Died: 26 December 1406; Tismana, Wallachia
- Venerated in: Eastern Orthodox Church
- Feast: 26 December
- Tradition or genre: Hesychasm

Nikodim Tismanski, also known as Nicodemus the Sanctified, Nikodim Osvećeni, Nikodim Vratnenski, Nikodim Grčić, and in Romanian, Nicodim de la Tismana, (Prilep, today in North Macedonia, then Byzantine Empire, c. 1320 – Tismana, Walachia, now Romania, 26 December 1406), was a Christian monk scribe and translator who was the founder of monasteries, one in Serbia and two in Romania. In Serbian medieval history he is remembered for conveying hesychastic monastic traditions and as a member of a diplomatic and ecclesiastical mission to Constantinople in 1375. He was one of the followers of St. Gregory of Sinai. Sanctified in 1767 by the Eastern Orthodox Church, he is commemorated on 26 December. Also, he was glorified by the Romanian Orthodox Church in 1955.

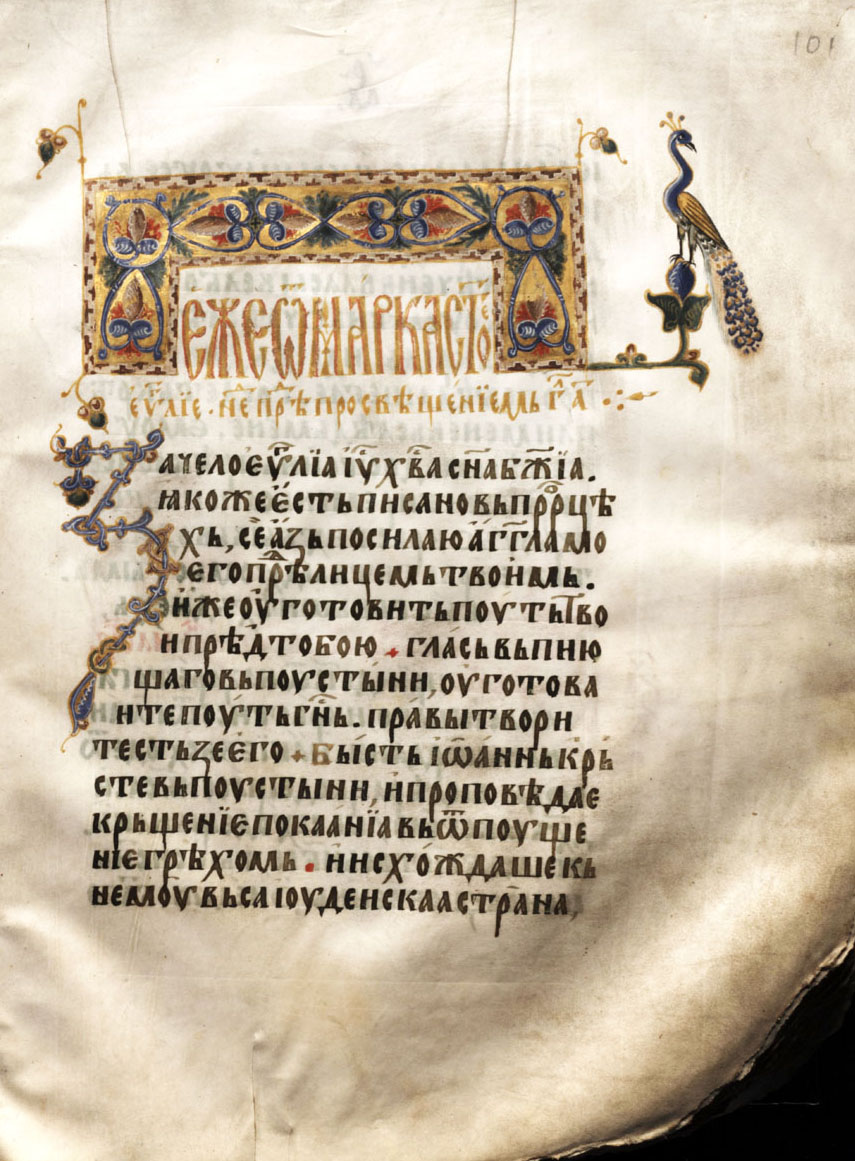
Page of the four gospels copied by Nicodemus of Tismana

== Origins ==
Nicodemus who was born most probably in Prilep, was of mixed Greek-Serbian origin to a Greek father from Kastoria and a Serbian mother. Other researchers point to an Aromanian father and a Bulgarian mother.

Serbian historian and academician Djordje Spase Radojičić (1905–1970), who wrote about Serbian medieval history, believes that Nikodim was born in Prilepac, near Novo Brdo, now in Kosovo, the birthplace of Prince Lazar of Serbia, to whom he was related. This fact explains that Prince Lazar chose Nikodim to participate in resolving the dispute between the Serbian Orthodox Church and the Patriarchate of Constantinople, as well as the fact that Lazar financed the construction of monasteries on both sides of the Danube.

The late Romanian Metropolitan Nestor Vornicescu writes that Nicodemus was a Serb, and that he was fluent in Serbian, Church Slavonic and Greek. Romanian historian Alexandru Piru states that Nikodim Tismanski's first written works were in Serbian, and that the manuscripts were reworked and translated into Romanian by Hieromonk Stefan de la Tismana in 1839. He also mentions that Nikodim's father was a Greek from the town of Kostur and that Nikodim was a relative of Prince Lazar.

Romanian historian Nicolae Iorga believes that Nikodim was an Aromanian originally, while in other papers he writes that Nikodim was a Serb and that he wrote in Serbian.

Nikodim copied the four gospels in 1405 in Church Slavonic at Prislop Monastery.

== Biography ==
Raised in piety and honesty, early in his youth he met some traveling monks in Serbia from the Hilandar monastery, and went with them to Mount Athos, where he studied and labored patiently with perseverance. After the death of the then-Abbot of Hilandar, the monks voted precocious Nikodim in his place. Nikodim was a friend of many famous people of that time, such as Prince Lazar of Serbia, Isaija the Monk, the Anonymous Athonite (biographer of the "Life of Isaiah", that is Isaija the Monk), Patriarch Euthymius of Tarnovo, Danilo II, Serbian Archbishop, and many others. There are sources that claim that he was related to Prince Lazar.

Prince Lazar wanted to appoint him to a high spiritual function, but he rejected it and settled in the eastern parts of the country, near the city of Kladovo on the Danube. After hearing about his virtuous life, a group of monks gathered around him, and in that place—Manastirica—they established a monastery and a church named "Holy Trinity". This monastery is known as the Monastery of the "Holy Trinity" or Manastir Manastirica. In the newly established monastery, he introduced the hesychasm lifestyle that he learned on the Holy Mountain.

The venerable Nikodim crossed the Danube River and settled in the northern Oltenia, where he erected the Vodice Monastery and dedicated it to Anthony the Great, the founder of Christian monasticism. When Prince Lazar sent a delegation to Constantinople to have a dialogue with Patriarch Philotheus I of Constantinople, he made sure that Nikodim went with Isaija the Monk who led the diplomatic mission. Upon returning from Constantinople, Nikodim erected the Tismana Monastery in Romania, dedicated to the Most Holy Virgin.

In the course of time, Tismana Monastery benefited from the help of ruling princes Stefan Lazarević, Radu I of Wallachia, Dan I of Wallachia, Mircea I of Wallachia and Sigismund, Holy Roman Emperor, to whom the pious Nicodemus was father confessor when he was king of Hungary (1385-1437).

During his lifetime, Nikodim reconstructed Visina Monastery as well as Prislop Monastery. Between 1399 and 1405 he retreated to Prislop Monastery in Transylvania and in 1406 he returned to Wallachia. Soon afterward, Saint Nicodemus met ruler prince Mircea the Old at Tismana, who called him “my prayerful father Nicodemus”, and in November he participated at Severin in the meeting with King Sigismund of Hungary (1385–1437), whom he impressed with his gift of working miracles.

Saint Nicodemus corresponded with Euthymius, Patriarch of Tarnovo (1375–1393), for defending the true faith against the Bogomil heresy.

Saint Nikodim reposed on 26 December 1406 and was buried in the narthex of the church of Tismana Monastery. His relics were kept there for a while, but later they were hidden in an unknown place because of the hostilities of the time. Only the forefinger of his right hand and his lead pectoral cross remained at Tismana.

== See also ==
- Saint Sava the founder of Serbian medieval literature
- Teodosije the Hilandarian (1246–1328), one of the most important Serbian writers in the Middle Ages
- Elder Grigorije (fl. 1310–1355), builder of Saint Archangels Monastery
- Antonije Bagaš (fl. 1356–1366), bought and restored the Agiou Pavlou monastery
- Lazar the Hilandarian (fl. 1404), the first known Serbian and Russian watchmaker
- Pachomius the Serb (fl. 1440s–1484), hagiographer of the Russian Church
- Miroslav Gospel
- Gabriel the Hilandarian
- Constantine of Kostenets
- Cyprian, Metropolitan of Kiev and All Rus'
