= Rajčin Sudić =

Medieval Serbian monk and scribe

Rajčin Sudić (c. 1335 – after 1360) was a Serbian monk-scribe who lived and worked during the time of Lord Vojihna, the father of Jefimija.

From the inscription Rajčin Sudić left in the margin of the Chronicles written in the 14th century, we know that he was a prisoner of some feudal ruler of that period. There is some evidence that this ruler was Vojihna because at the time he possessed many fiefs. It is possible that Sudić was a scapegoat of a vehement opponent of "clan government". That is usurpation of administrative posts by men of two, three and more fiefs, an abuse which threatened to follow the overthrow of Vojihna—he must have been accused by someone that Sudić allegedly conspired to assist Vojihna's enemies and was imprisoned for five months, along with another "accomplice" by the name of Kijevac. While in prison he wrote in "An Inscription":

God have mercy upon the sinful Rajčin Sudić and Kijevac (who are) unworthy to look at heaven, for our souls are extremely sorrowful even unto death: the Governor kept us five months in prison, though we were guilty of nothing. Lord Christ knows we place our hope in no one but God who created heaven and earth and sea and all that is therein. May that God leads us from the lowest pit, for the Holy Scriptures say, "Put not your trust in princes, in a son of man, in whom there is no help. When his breath departs, he returns to his earth; on that very day his plans perish. Blessed is the man who trusts the Lord God."

Woe, woe, how sad it is in this dungeon in this stench! O sorrow, my little sorrow, there is no one to whom I can talk to about you—only to you, Mother of God of Kosenica (monastery); lead me out of peril, for Christ knows that they falsely accused us (innocent ones); he (the Governor) did not let us have justice, a trial, or sentence, but he imprisoned us, the innocent, myself and Kijevac, and chained us into a tower; may God see it and no one else.

The probable date of the inscription is the year 1360. The manuscript in which that inscription was included was burnt in 1941 when the Serbian National Library in Belgrade, where the manuscript was housed, was hit by bombs from German planes.

== See also ==
- Teodosije the Hilandarian (1246–1328), one of the most important Serbian writers in the Middle Ages
- Elder Grigorije (fl. 1310–1355), builder of Saint Archangels Monastery
- Antonije Bagaš (fl. 1356–1366), bought and restored the Agiou Pavlou monastery
- Lazar the Hilandarian (fl. 1404), the first known Serbian and Russian watchmaker
- Pachomius the Serb (fl. 1440s–1484), hagiographer of the Russian Church
