= Isaija the Monk =

14th-century Serbian monk

Isaija the Monk (Serbian: Инок Исаија or in English: Inok Isaija; c. 1300 – c. after 1375), also known as Elder Isaija (Elder Isaiah) (Старац Исаија) and Isaija of Serres (Elder Isaiah of Serres) (Исаија Серски), was a 14th-century Serbian monk, one of many Serbian monk-scribes in the Middle Ages who translated ancient Greek manuscripts into the Serbian recension of Old Church Slavonic. His major work is the translation of the works of Pseudo-Dionysius the Areopagite from Byzantine Greek. Isaija's commentaries on political events occur in the context of the fall of the Serbian principality of Serres in 1371, which led the descendants of these local governors to accept Ottoman suzerainty.

== Biography ==
As a young boy, Isaija joined the monastic life of the Serbian Orthodox Church affiliated to St. Joachim of Osogovo Monastery on Osogovo Mountain in northern Macedonia, and then to Hilandar Monastery on Mount Athos in Greece, where he spent the rest of his life. In Hilandar, he worked as a translator and became very respected by Serbian rulers as attested to by the anonymous author of The Life of the Monk Isaija, probably written in the late 14th century.

Isaija was a very prominent individual during the reign of Stephen Dushan and Lazar of Serbia. He was a monk noted for his work as a writer and translator. Between 1353 and 1363, he travelled throughout Serbia; he later served as a Serbian diplomat and participated in the negotiations initiated by Prince Lazar to reconcile the Serbian and Greek Churches, resulting in agreement in 1375 after discussions with Patriarch Philotheus I of Constantinople.

Isaija's dragoman on the mission to Constantinople was Nicodemus of Tismana, Prince Lazar's relative.

At the end of his Pseudo-Dionysius the Areopagite translation, Isaija added an inscription and used a cryptogram to write his name.

Isaija had an anonymous disciple, known only as Isaija's Disciple, who wrote the biography of "Isaija the Monk". No biographical data of this author is extant. He is known in Serbian literature only as Nepoznati Svetogorac, the Anonymous Athonite.

== Work ==
The climate of despair which set in after the Battle of Maritsa in 1371 is expressed in a long personal comment, written by Isaija the Monk. This literary comment is appended to Isaija's translation of the works of Pseudo-Dionysius the Areopagite into Old Serbian which, he says, he had started "in happy times," but had finished it after the battle, "when Ishmelites spread over the entire land as birds in the air, slaying some of the Christians, sending others into slavery... And the land became deprived of all that is good, people, beast, the fruit of all kind. There was no prince, nor leader or teacher among people, nobody to save them... And truly was the living envying the dead."

== See also ==
- Saint Sava (1174–1236), a recognised Serbian writer
- Teodosije the Hilandarian (1246–1328), one of the most important Serbian writers in the Middle Ages
- Elder Grigorije (fl. 1310–1355), builder of Saint Archangels Monastery
- Antonije Bagaš (fl. 1356–1366), bought and restored the Agiou Pavlou monastery
- Lazar the Hilandarian (fl. 1404), the first known Serbian and Russian watchmaker
- Pachomius the Serb (fl. 1440s–1484), hagiographer of the Russian Church
