= Romylos of Vidin =

14th-century Bulgarian monk (1330–1385)

Saint Romylos of Vidin
- Native name: Rusko

Personal details
- Born: 1330 Vidin, Tsardom of Vidin
- Died: 1385 (aged 54–55) Ravanica monastery, Serbian Despotate
- Denomination: Bulgarian Orthodox

Romylos of Vidin, also known as Romylos of Ravanica or Romylus the Athonite (Romil Svetogorac, Romil Svetogorski; Bulgarian: Ромил Бдински; Serbian: Ромил Раванички), was a 14th-century Bulgarian monk, a disciple of Gregory of Sinai. He is also known as the teacher of Grigorije of Gornjak. He is regarded as part of both Bulgarian and Serbian literature.

== Biography ==
He was born in Vidin, Tsardom of Vidin c. 1330 and died in the Ravanica Monastery, Serbia c. 1385. Romylos was among the brightest followers of the Hesychast tradition in the Eastern Orthodox Church in the 14th century. In the wake of the Ottoman conquest of Bulgaria Romylos was among the many Bulgarian intellectuals who emigrated to neighbouring Orthodox countries and brought their talents and texts. His tomb is in the church narthex of the Monastery of Ravanica, Serbian Despotate.

== Life ==
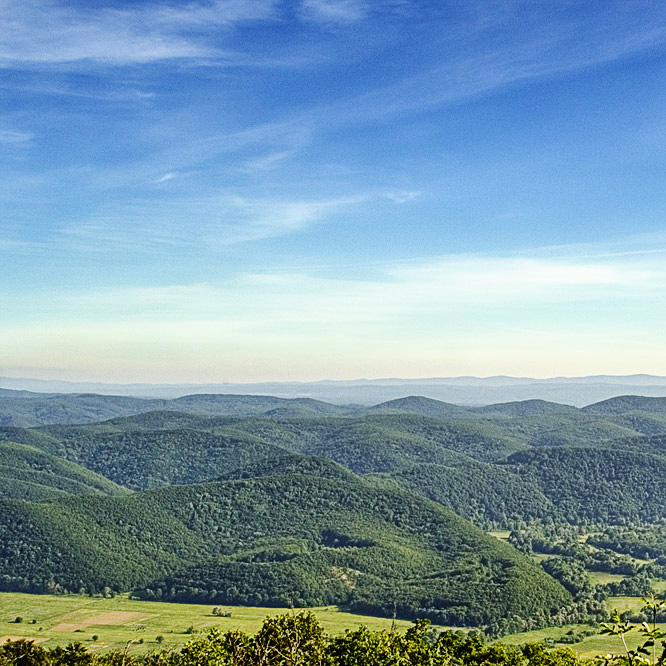
A view of Strandzha where Romylos spent much of his youth developing as a Hesychast

He was born in the first quarter of the fourteenth century in the "valiant and glorious city Vidin", northwestern Bulgaria, and given the Bulgarian name of Rusko or Rayko. He was born in a wealthy family to a Bulgarian mother and Greek father. He studied in a school and made impression with his talents. When he reached the age of 14-15 he left Vidin and headed for the capital Tarnovo to avoid his parents' plans to marry him. There he became a monk in one of the many monasteries around the capital and took the monastic name Romanos, later changed to Romylos.

The young monk became a follower of Hesychasm (from Greek "stillness, rest, quiet, silence") – an eremitic tradition of prayer in the Eastern Orthodox Church that flourished in the Balkans during the 14th century and was patronized by the Bulgarian emperor Ivan Alexander (r. 1331–1371). In 1335, Ivan Alexander gave refuge to the renowned hesychast Gregory of Sinai and provided funds for the construction of a monastery near Paroria in the Strandzha Mountains in the southeast of the country, which attracted monks from Bulgaria, Byzantium, and Serbia. Romylos moved to Paroria and became one of Gregory's disciples. There he was one of the most eminent and fervent supporters of the Hesychast theological doctrine, as it was developed in the middle of the 14th century. His stay at Paroria was in difficult times. He had to flee three times to seek safety in the vicinity of Tarnovo near Kilifarevo due to famine and Ottoman brigands.

The persistent Ottoman raids at Paroria eventually compelled Romylos to escape to Mount Athos in the early 1350s. On Mount Athos he lived an ascetic life in isolation near the Great Lavra. Following the Christian defeat at the hands of the Ottoman Turks in the Battle of Maritsa in 1371 Romylos fled to Valona on the Adriatic Sea in modern-day Albania. He could not find peace in Valona because the governors of the region were unjust and the priests were unworthy and eventually moved to the Serbian Despotate. There he settled in the Ravanica Monastery in the Kučaj mountains founded in 1377 and completed in 1381 by Prince Lazar of Serbia. The monastery was founded as a refuge for Hesychast monks. Romylos remained in Ravanica until his death a few years later, s. 1385. He died at Ravanica Monastery on 16 January. His remains are kept in the monastery and are venerated by both Orthodox and Catholics. His feast day is 16 January according to the Slavonic version of his vita; the Greek version has 1 November.

== Vita and cult ==
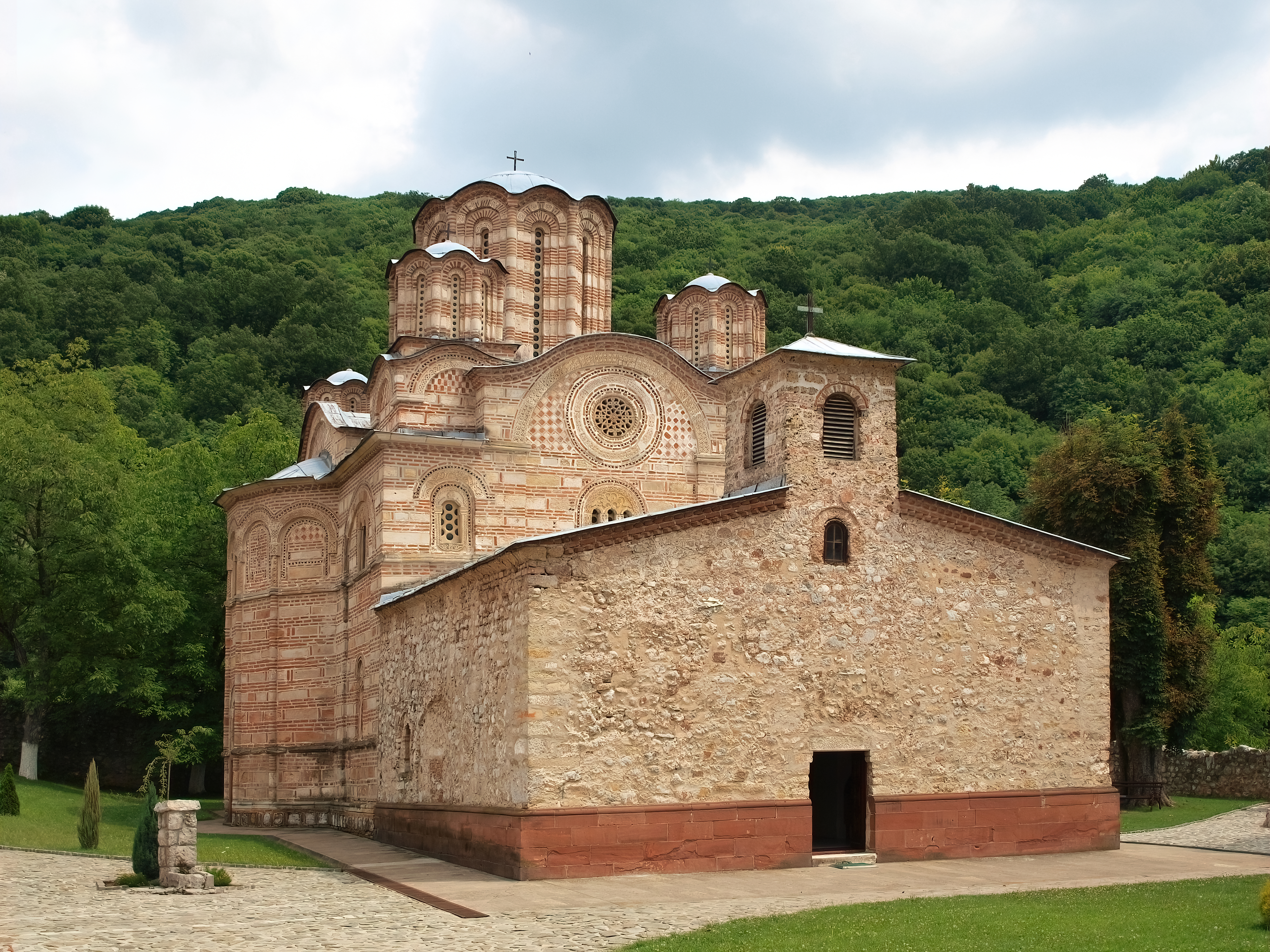
The relics of St. Romylos are kept in the Ravanica Monastery

The Vita of Romylos was written before 1391 by one of his disciples from Mount Athos called Gregory. Both the Greek and the Slavonic version of his Vita refer to the period he spent on Athos interlacing popular hagiographical clichés with patristic sermons on the eternal value of the monastic virtues, yielding no essential data about his participation in the cultural and philological life of the monastic peninsula. The commonly accepted opinion on the chronological sequence of the Slavic and Greek variant of his Life has been established only in the last two decades of the twentieth century. P. A. Syrku (1855-1905), the scholar who first discovered and published the Slavic text in 1900, based on a Serbian manuscript belonging to the Alexander Hilferding collection, was inclined to accept that it was not a translation but an original text composed directly in Slavic.

St. Romylos was definitely a specific, but neither very popular nor widely venerated saint. According to K. Ivanova, his cult is well attested only on Athos and in the region adjacent to the Monastery of Ravanica in Serbia, where he died.

== See also ==
- List of Serbian saints
- Saint Sava
- Gabriel the Hilandarian
- Constantine of Kostenets
- Cyprian, Metropolitan of Kiev and All Rus'
- Gregory Tsamblak
- Grigorije Vasilije
- Roman of Đunis
- Gregory of Sinai

== Sources ==
- Андреев (Andreev), Йордан (Jordan); Лалков (Lalkov), Милчо (Milcho) (1996). Българските ханове и царе (The Bulgarian Khans and Tsars) (in Bulgarian). Велико Търново (Veliko Tarnovo): Абагар (Abagar). ISBN 954-427-216-X.
- Андреев (Andreev), Йордан (Jordan); Лазаров (Lazarov), Иван (Ivan); Павлов (Pavlov), Пламен (Plamen) (2012). Кой кой е в средновековна България [Who is Who in Medieval Bulgaria] (in Bulgarian). Изток Запад (Iztok Zapad). ISBN 978-619-152-012-1.
- Bartusis, M., K. Ben Nasser, and A. Laiou (1982). "Days and deeds of a hesychast saint: A translation of the Greek life of Saint Romylos". Byzantine Studies 9(1): 24– 47.
- Божилов (Bozhilov), Иван (Ivan); Гюзелев (Gyuzelev), Васил (Vasil) (1999). История на средновековна България VII–XIV век (History of Medieval Bulgaria VII–XIV centuries) (in Bulgarian). София (Sofia): Анубис (Anubis). ISBN 954-426-204-0.
- Fine, J. (1987). The Late Medieval Balkans, A Critical Survey from the Late Twelfth Century to the Ottoman Conquest. University of Michigan Press. ISBN 0-472-10079-3.
- Halkin, François (1961). Un ermite des Balkans au XIV siècle: La Vie grecque inédite de Saint Romylos.
- Kazhdan, A. (1991). The Oxford Dictionary of Byzantium. New York, Oxford: Oxford University Press. ISBN 0-19-504652-8.
