= Dimitar of Kratovo =

15th-century Slavic writer

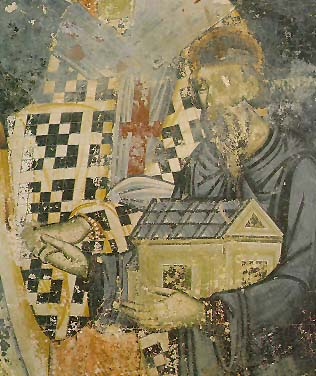
- Born: Димитар Кратовски
- Occupations: priest, writer
- Years active: 15th century

Dimitar of Kratovo (Bulgarian: Димитър Кратовски, Serbian: Димитар Кратовски) was a 15th-century Slavic writer and lexicographer, and one of the most important members of the Kratovo Literary School during the Ottoman Empire.

== Biography ==
Next to nothing is known about his life. In all probability he was a priest or, even more likely, a monk. Dimitar was active in mid-15th century at the time when his town, Kratovo, was in the hands of Ottomans for more than half a century. However, rich ore in the vicinity of the town and the wealth that stemmed from this source made it an important center for various arts, not least literature.

In 1466 the Archbishop of Ohrid, Dorotheus, was searching for a learned man to translate the Syntagma of Matthew Blastares from Greek into Serbian because his cathedral seat did not have that book in the language that would be understood by natives. When he visited Kratovo, he met Dimitar and appointed him to do this. When Dimitar started the translation, he said that he began to translate the "Law Book" for Archbishop Dorotheus of Ohrid "from the Greek language into Serbian" (v eže sastaviti mi pisaniem srbskoga jezika sočinenie, rekše knigu imenuemu zakonik) since the Cathedral Church in Ohrid did not have that book "in Serbian" (po jeziku srbskom) but only in Greek.

== Work ==
After translating the Syntagma, Dimitar continued and in its nine pages (out of ten that survived) he noted down a list of metropolitans and archbishops under the jurisdiction of the Patriarch of Constantinople. He continued with a brief Latin–Slavic dictionary of only sixty-seven words. This is followed by his “Epilogue” — an original literary text — in which Dimitar told the story of how the book came to be translated and gives us his thoughts on life, morals, religion, Church and society of his day and age. In the end the author left transcripts of two letters exchanged in 1456 between Archbishop Dorotheus and Moldavian duke Stephen the Great.
