= Grigorije of Prizren =

Elder Grigorije
- Born: c. 1310; Kingdom of Serbia
- Died: 1355 (aged c. 45)
- Occupations: clergyman, writer
- Writing career
- Language: Serbian Old Church Slavonic

Elder Grigorije (Serbian: Старац Григорије; fl. 1310–55) was a Serbian Orthodox clergyman and writer. Grigorije hailed from the Prizren region, and was a nobleman in the Serbian Empire until he took monastic vows and received the monastic title of elder (starac). Together with monk Jakov of Serres he led the building of the Monastery of the Holy Archangels in Prizren, the endowment of Emperor Stefan Dušan (r. 1331–55), and became the first hegumen. Grigorije and monk Teodosije of Hilandar together left Mount Athos for Serbia where they would write the Žitije svetog Petra Koriškog, as well as songs and services for the Saint. It is thought that he was one of the protégés of Gregory of Sinai, and there exists indications that he is the so-called "Danilo's pupil" (Danilov učenik), i.e. the main author of the great work Žitija kraljeva i arhiepiskopa srpskih, which was started by Archbishop Danilo II (s. 1324–37).

== See also ==
- Teodosije the Hilandarian (1246-1328), one of the most important Serbian writers in the Middle Ages
- Antonije Bagaš (fl. 1356-1366), bought and restored the Agiou Pavlou monastery
- Lazar the Hilandarian (fl. 1404), the first known Serbian and Russian watchmaker
- Pachomius the Serb (fl. 1440s-1484), hagiographer of the Russian Church
- Jakov of Serres
