= Agiou Pavlou Monastery =

Eastern Orthodox monastery, Mount Athos

Agiou Pavlou
- Αγίου Παύλου; Sfântul Pavel
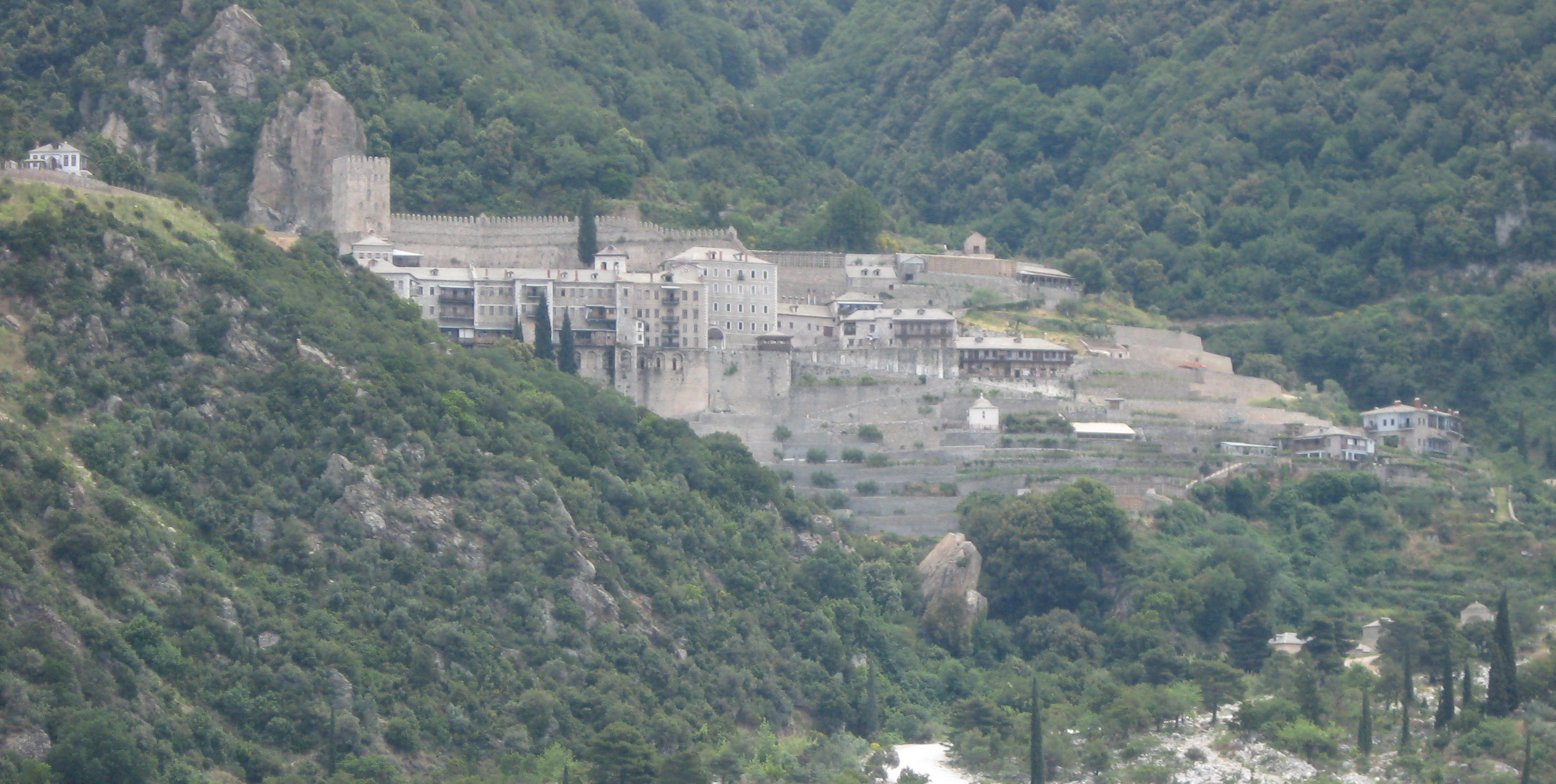
- External view of the monastery

- Location within Mount Athos

Monastery information
- Full name: Holy Monastery of Agiou Pavlou
- Order: Greek Orthodox
- Established: Before 1035
- Dedication: the Presentation of Jesus Christ at the Temple
- Celebration: 2 February

People
- Founder: Saint Paul of Xeropotamou
- Prior: Archimandrite Elder Parthenius (Mourelatos)
- Important associated figures: Archimandrite Averchie, Antonije Bagaš

Site
- Location: Mount Athos; Greece
- Coordinates: 40°09′40″N 24°17′25″E
- Public access: Men only

Agiou Pavlou Monastery (Greek: Μονή Αγίου Παύλου; Romanian: Mănăstirea Sfântul Pavel) is an Eastern Orthodox monastery in the monastic state of Mount Athos, located on the easternmost peninsula of Chalkidiki, Greece. The founder of monastery was Paul of Xeropotamou, after whom it is named.

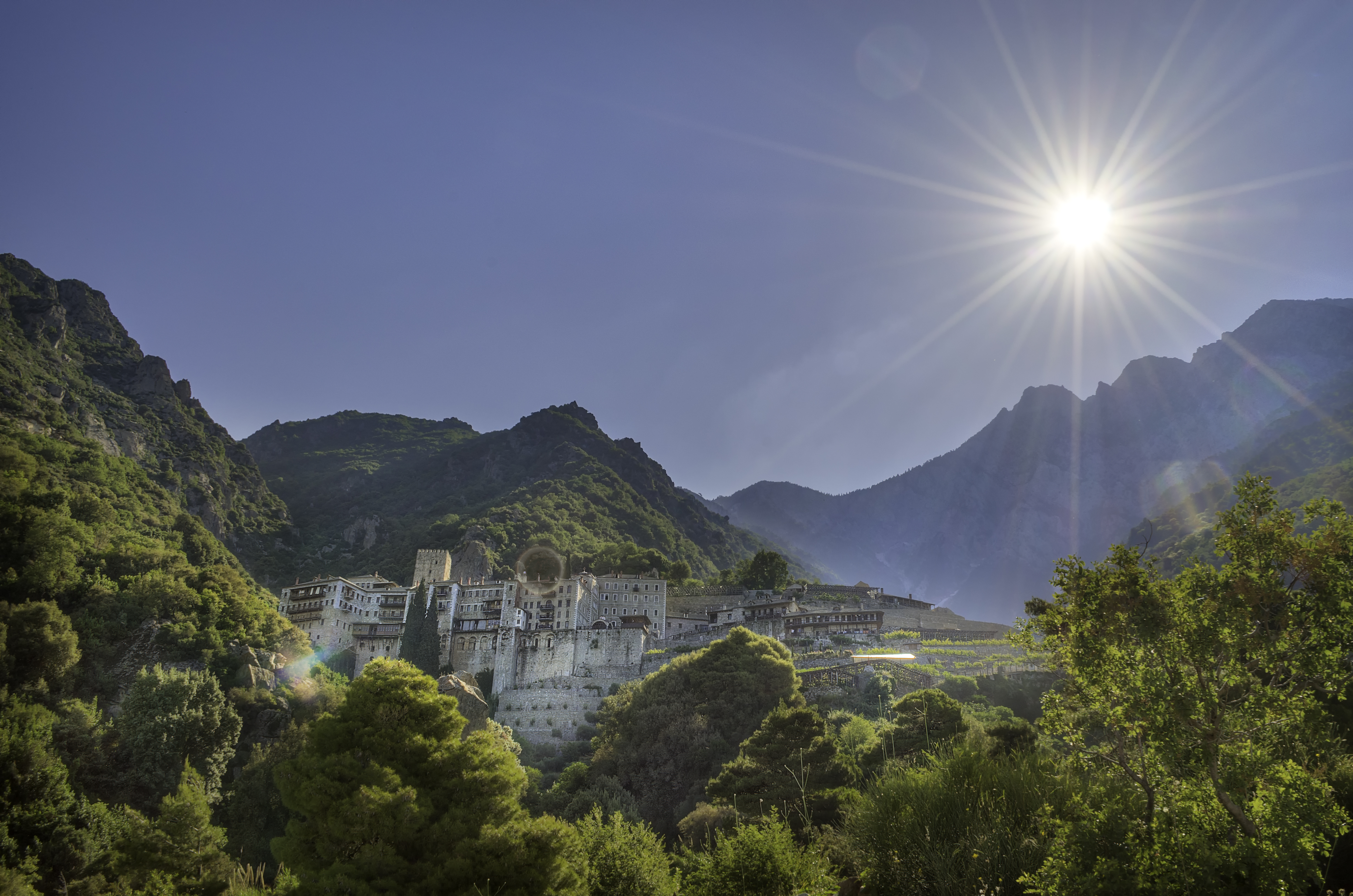
Agiou Pavlou Monastery

The monastery is in the western part of the Athos peninsula and its Katholikon (main church) is dedicated to the Presentation of Christ in the Temple. Its feast day is celebrated on 2 February. (Since the monastic community of Mount Athos observes the Julian Calendar, which is currently 13 days behind the civil calendar, 2 February on the Julian Calendar falls on 15 February of the modern Gregorian Calendar.)

== History ==
The monastery was founded in the late 10th to early 11th century by Saint Paul of Xeropotamou, also the founder of the Xeropotamou Monastery. Documents attest of its independence from Xeropotamou by 1035. The Monastery was initially dedicated to Saint George but early on took the name of its founder. Its dedication was later changed to the Presentation of Jesus Christ to the Temple.

Between 1355 and 1365, the Serbian nobleman Antonije Bagaš, together with Nikola Radonja, bought and restored the ruined monastery, becoming its abbott. The restoration of the monastery, supported by Radonja's brothers Vuk Branković and Grgur Branković, marked the beginning of the Serbian period of its history. On 14 October 1410, Serbian Despot Đurađ Branković donated Kuzmin to the monastery, as it was the wish of deceased Prince Lazar Hrebeljanović. Russian pilgrim Isaiah confirms that by the end of the 15th century the monastery was Serb.

In October 1845 Porphyrius Uspensky took 12 leaves of the Radoslav Gospel during his visit, which according to his opinion were the most valuable, and gave them to the Russian National Library in St. Petersburg. The rest of the leaves which remained in the monastery were lost.

The monastery ranks fourteenth in the hierarchy of the Athonite monasteries. Its library contains 494 manuscripts and over 12,000 printed books.

The monastery contains 31 working monks and has two idiorrhythmic sketes (smaller, dependent monastic houses): the Romanian Lakkoskiti and the Greek Nea Skiti (New Skete).
