= Miroslav Gospel =

Serbian Cyrillic illuminated manuscript Gospel Book

Miroslav's Gospel Мирослављево jеванђеље
- National Museum of Serbia, Belgrade, Serbia
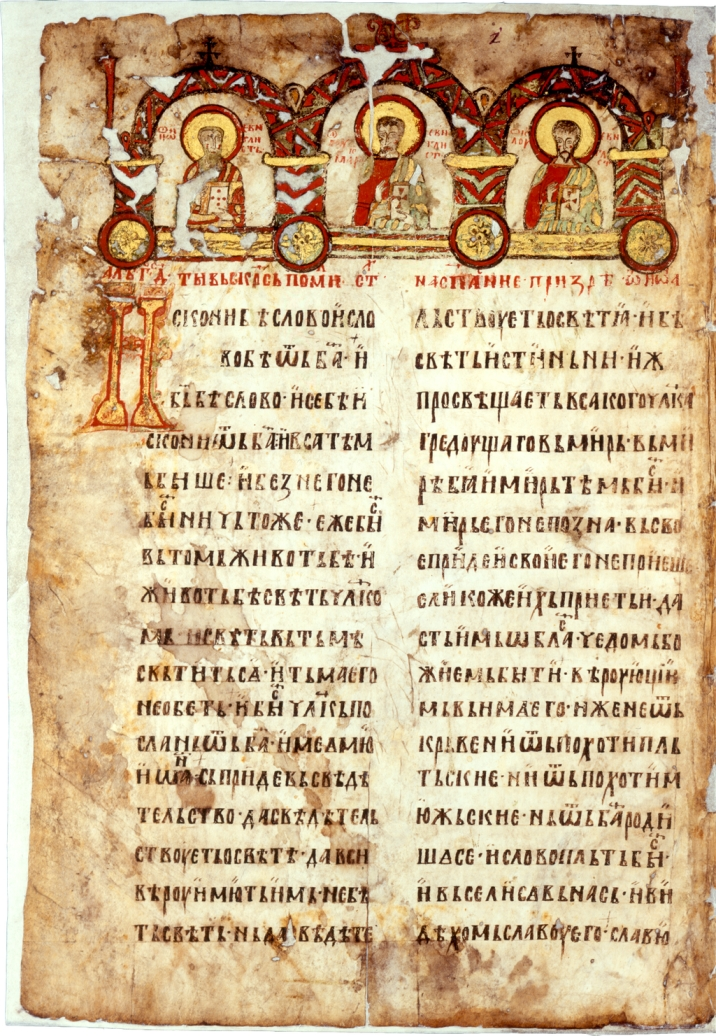
- First page of the Codex
- Date: 1180
- Place of origin: Grand Principality of Serbia
- Language: Serbian Church Slavic
- Script: Serbian Cyrillic
- Previously kept: Serbian Orthodox Hilandar monastery

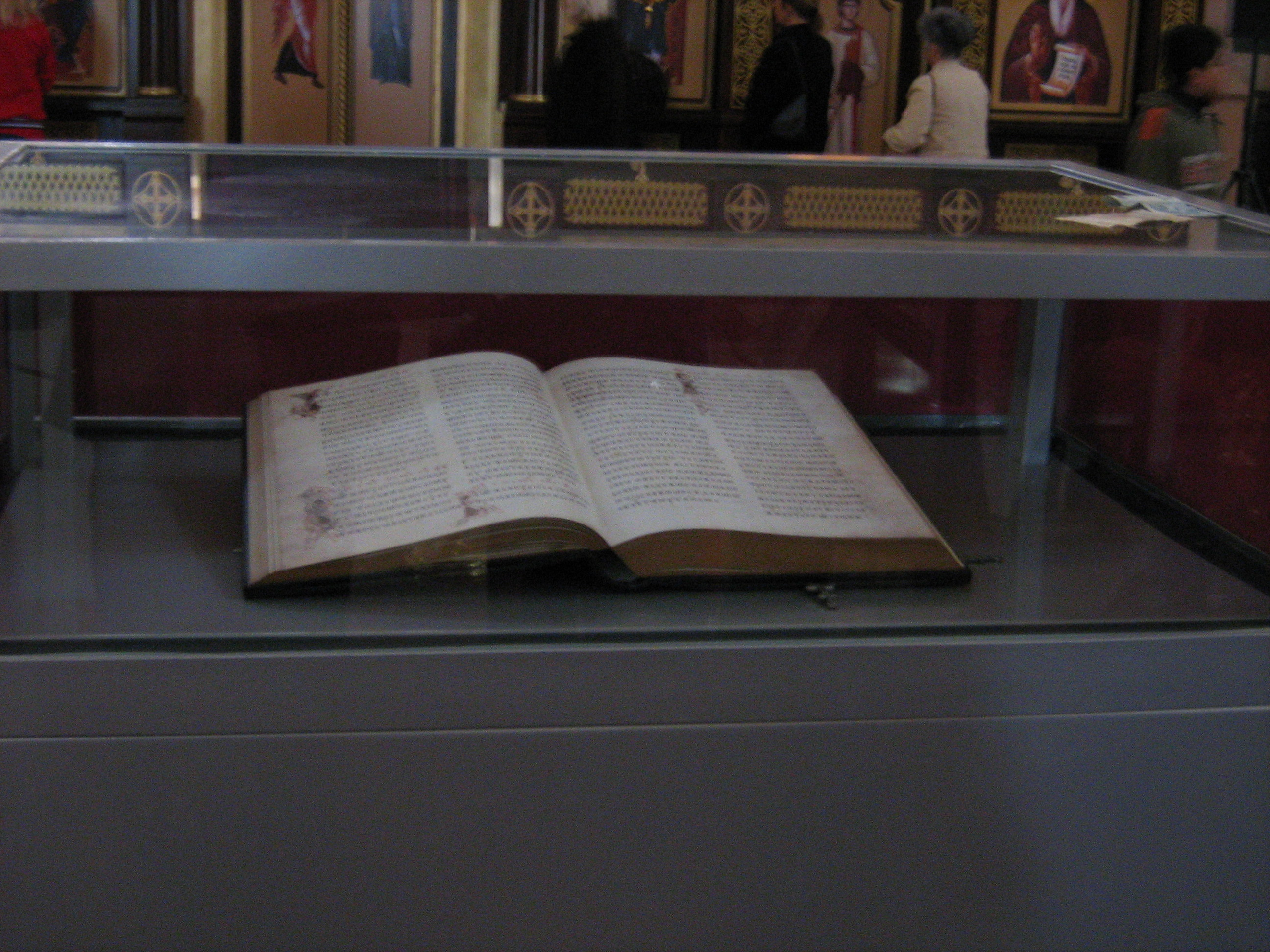
A copy of the Miroslav Gospel at the Church of Saint Sava

Miroslav Gospel (Serbian: Мирослављево jеванђеље / Miroslavljevo jevanđelje, pronounced [mǐrɔslaʋʎɛʋɔ jɛʋǎndʑɛːʎɛ]) is a 362-page Serbian Cyrillic illuminated manuscript Gospel Book on parchment with very rich decorations. It is one of the oldest surviving documents written in the Serbian recension of Church Slavonic. The gospel is considered a masterpiece of illustration and calligraphy.

During Saint Sava's time, a Serbian Prophliestologion (Cod. 313), a Novgorod Sticherarion (Cod. 301), and Kiev Irmologion (Cod. 308) with Old Church Slavonic musical neumatic notation were also found in the same place as Hilandar Fragments from the 10th and early 11th century (now in Odessa). It is presumed that both Miroslav Gospel and Vukan's Gospel reached Hilandar at the same.

== Origin and discovery ==
Miroslav's Gospel was commissioned in the 12th century (in the year 1180) by Serbian Prince Miroslav, the ruler (knez) of Hum and the brother of Stefan Nemanja, the Grand Prince of Serbia. The first to discover and study the manuscript were three Russian scholars: Vladimir Stasov, Fyodor Buslayev, and Nikodim Kondakov in 1874.

A leaf of the book which the Archbishop Porphyrius Uspensky had cut out of the book from the Hilandar Monastery library in 1845 was first publicly shown at an exhibition in Kiev in 1874. The earliest facsimile edition appeared in Vienna in 1897. The book was traditionally kept at the Hilandar Monastery on Mount Athos, before it was presented to King Alexander I of Serbia, on the occasion of his visit to the monastery in 1896. Today it is in the collection of the National Museum of Serbia in Belgrade.

The book was originally transcribed in Kotor in modern-day Montenegro between 1186 and 1190 from an earlier text. Most pages are by an unknown scribe from Zeta, with the last few pages written by the scribe Grigorije of Raška, also known as Grigorije the Scribe or Pupil. Although Miroslav's Gospel is one of the earliest Cyrillic-texted manuscripts, the document appeared later than other Serbian liturgical manuscripts written in Glagolitic. The language used is considered unique as it showed the transition between Old Church Slavonic and the first recognizably distinct Serbian language.

In 2005, the Miroslav Gospel was inscribed in UNESCO's Memory of the World international register of Serbia in recognition of its global importance.

== See also ==
- Medieval Serbian literature
- Serbian manuscripts
- John the Deacon
- Teodosije the Hilandarian (1246-1328), one of the most important Serbian writers in the Middle Ages
