= Gregory Tsamblak =

Bulgarian scholar (c.1365 – c.1420)

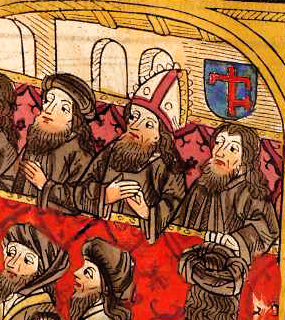
Gregory Tsamblak (left) at the Council of Constance

Gregory Tsamblak (Note: Bulgarian: Григорий Цамблак; Greek: Γρηγόριος Τζαμπλάκων; Romanian: Grigorie Țamblac; Serbian Cyrillic: Григорије Цамблак; Ukrainian: Григорій Цамблак.) (c. 1365 – c. 1420), member of the Tzamplakon family, was a Bulgarian writer and cleric active in Bulgaria, Moldavia, Serbia, Lithuania, and the Principality of Kiev.

== Biography ==
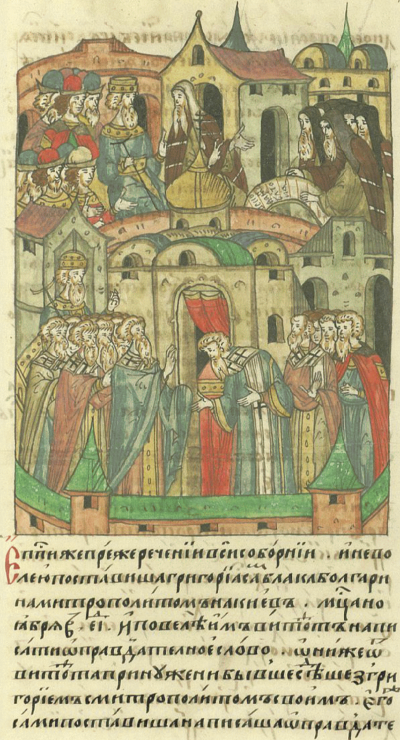
Consecration of Gregory as metropolitan, miniature from the Illustrated Chronicle of Ivan the Terrible, 16th century

=== Early life ===
He was born into the Tzamplakon family in the Bulgarian capital of Tarnovo around 1364–1365.

=== Serbia ===
During his sojourn in Serbia he wrote a biography of Stephen Uroš III, a hymn for the church service honoring Stefan of Dečani, and a report on the transfer of the remnants of Saint Paraskeva to Serbia, for which he also rewrote the service.

=== Grand Duchy of Lithuania ===
In 1414, Grand Duke Vytautas attempted to re-establish the Metropolis of Lithuania. He arranged for a synod of bishops to elect Gregory as the metropolitan of Lithuania. The consecration took place without the consent of Patriarch Euthymius II of Constantinople, who deposed and anathematized him and who confirmed the same in letters to Metropolitan Photius of Kiev, Emperor Manuel II Palaeologos, and Grand Prince Vasily I of Moscow. After Gregory's death in the winter of 1419–1420, Photius made peace with Vytautas. As a result, the entirety of the Metropolis of Kiev and all Rus', including Galicia, was unified under Photius until his death in 1431.

The rivalry between Vilnius and Moscow effectively ended in 1448, when Moscow began selecting the metropolitans independently without approval from the Ecumenical Patriarchate.

== See also ==
- Constantine of Kostenets
- Dimitar of Kratovo
- Nicodemus of Tismana
- Anonymous Athonite
- Patriarch Evtimiy

== Sources ==
- "Григорий Цамблак" . Brockhaus and Efron Encyclopedic Dictionary (in Russian). 1906.
- Rowell, Stephen Christopher (1994). Lithuania Ascending: A Pagan Empire Within East-Central Europe, 1295–1345. Cambridge: Cambridge University Press. ISBN 978-1-107-65876-9.

Preceded by Roman	Metropolitan of Lithuania (Not recognised by the Ecumenical Patriarchate); 1414–1420	Succeeded by Abolished (If it ever existed)
