= Lazar the Serb =

Serbian monk and inventor (fl. 1404)

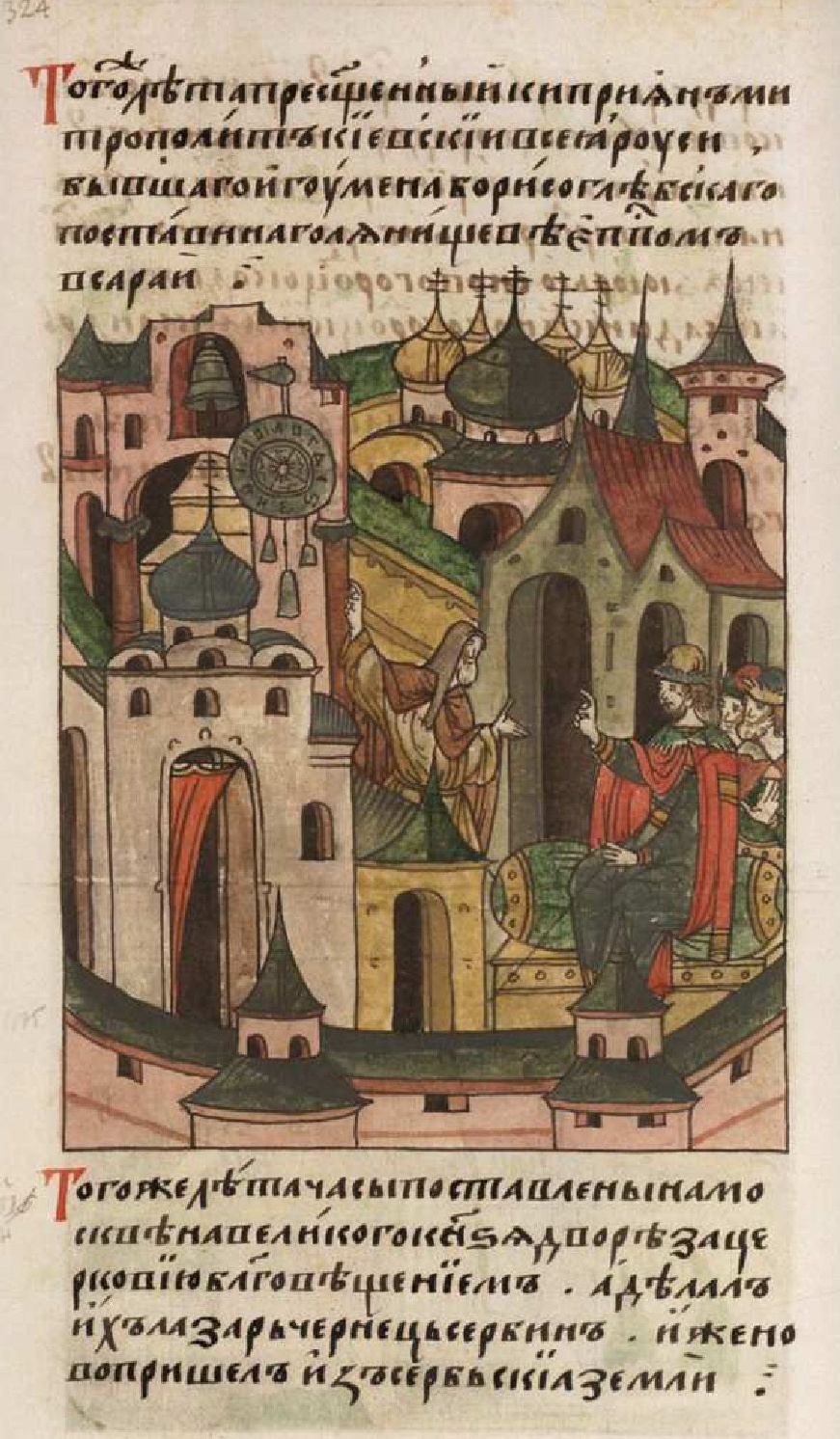
- Lazar the Serb showing his clock tower to Vasily I of Moscow, miniature from the Illustrated Chronicle of Ivan the Terrible
- Born: mid-14th century Prizren, Serbian Empire
- Died: after 1404
- Known for: Inventing the first mechanical clock in Russia, which was also the country's first public clock
- Scientific career
- Fields: Invention

Lazar (Serbian: Лазар; Russian: Лазарь), also known as Lazar the Serb or Lazar the Hilandarian (fl. 1404), was a Serbian Orthodox monk-scribe and horologist who invented and built the first known mechanical public clock in Russia in 1404. The clock, which also struck the hours, was built at the request of Grand Prince Vasily I of Moscow (r. 1389–1425). Prior to his arrival in Moscow, Lazar had served as a monk in the Serbian Hilandar monastery at Mount Athos. The clock tower was located in the palace behind the Cathedral of the Annunciation. However, the clock and the church in which it was located have not survived.

== Life ==
A Serb, Lazar was born in the town of Prizren, in the Serbian Empire. He was a monk with the rank of crnorizac (Serbian: црноризац; Russian: чернец, romanized: chernets) serving at the Serbian Orthodox Hilandar monastery, a centre of Serbian religious and secular culture and "the first Serbian university", located on Mount Athos. Lazar likely left Mount Athos as a result of the Rise of the Ottoman Empire. Russian chronicles speak of Lazar, newly arrived from Serbia, inventing and building a clock on a tower in the Grand Prince's palace in Moscow behind the Cathedral of the Annunciation at the request of Vasily I, the Grand Prince of Moscow (r. 1389–1425). It was the first ever spring-driven (mechanical) clock, or striking clock, in Russia, and also the country's first public clock. The clock numbers were written in Church Slavonic. It was among the first ten such advanced clocks in Europe, and was regarded a technical miracle at the time. Clocks in urban towers, or municipal hour signals, did exist earlier in Italy, though it is not known how they indicated the hours. In 1344, Paduan chronicles confirmed an entirely new technology – a clock in a tower at the Paduan palace which automatically struck the hours (24h).

This hour-marker is called an hour-measure; each hour a hammer strikes the bell, measuring and counting the hours of the night and of the day . . . No man strikes it, but it is somehow wondrous strangely fashioned to look like a man and sound and move of itself, by man's cunning, with great invention and cleverness.

— A description of Lazar's clock

The clock tower has not survived, and its exact location is undetermined, although it is believed to have been located at or near the Spasskaya Tower (formerly known as Frolovskaya). The clock was for a long time the only one in Moscow and Russia, and worked for more than two centuries without failure. It was then replaced by another clock which was destroyed in a fire. A miniature from the 16th-century Ostermanovskij manuscript (of the Litsevoy Collection of Chronicles, Ancient Chronicle, sheet 587, drawing 1175) exists which depicts the monk Lazar showing Vasily and two of his vassals the finished clock tower. Although the tower is gone, the illustration of the clock tower and monastery can be seen in the Polytechnical Museum in Moscow as of 2006. A 16th-century chronicle says that Lazar was paid 150 rubles for his work ("sta bole polutorasta rublev").

== Legacy ==
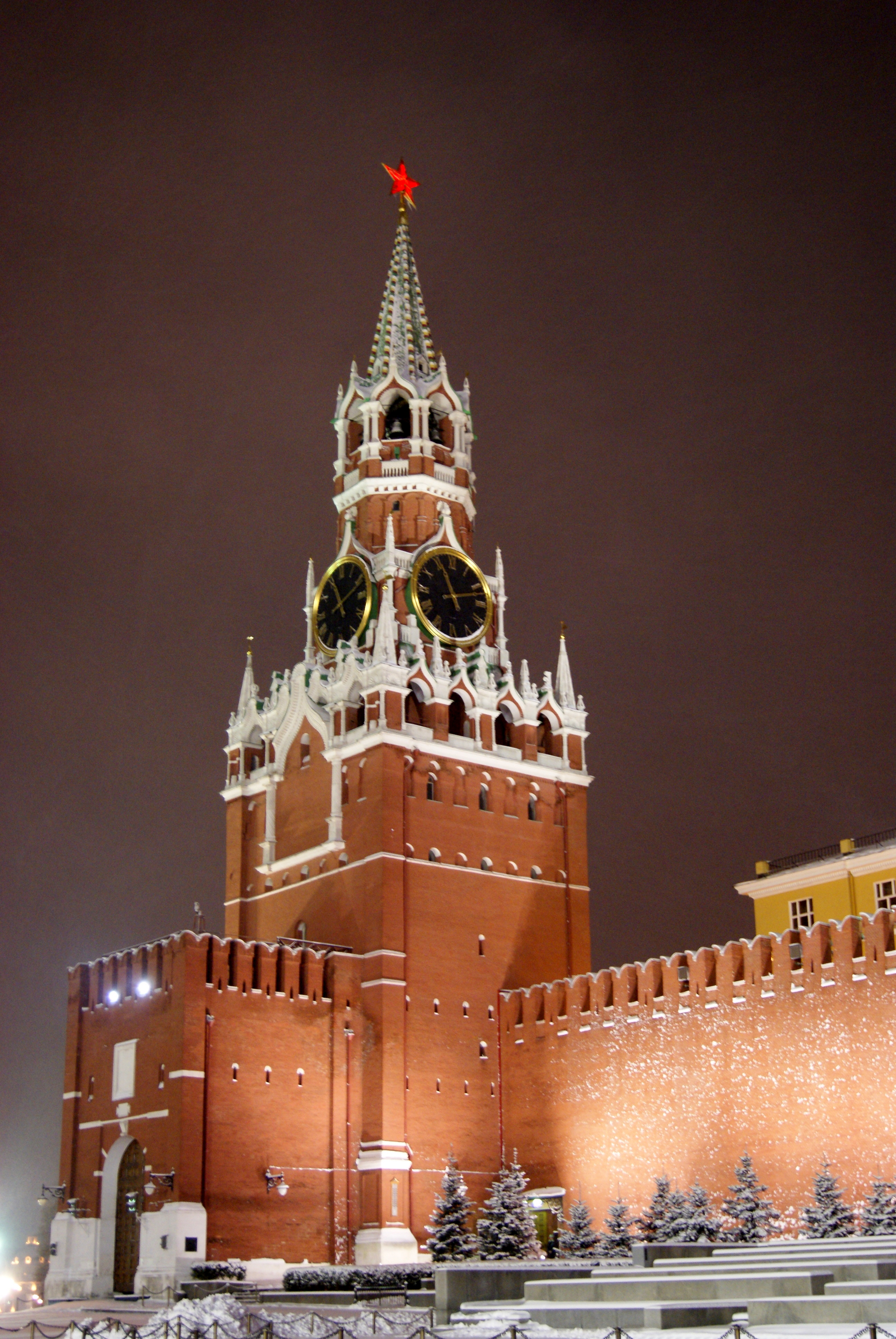
The Spasskaya Tower, which was possibly built on or near the location of the clock tower

The Serbian Orthodox Church decided to celebrate the 600th anniversary of the monk Lazar's invention and construction of the great clock tower in the Moscow Kremlin on the feast of the Presentation of Mary (Ваведење) on 4 December 2004. The liturgies of the churches in Belgrade and Moscow, the Hilandar (where the brotherhood had their krsna slava) and the Monastery of the Holy Archangels, mentioned Lazar. A memorial sundial was placed on the Academy of the Serbian Orthodox Church in Belgrade.

The Serbian mathematician Dr. Dragan Trifunović noted Lazar and his invention as part of Serbian mathematics of the Middle Ages, saying that "as a mathematician it was interesting how Lazar forged the clock. He had to have knowledge of Archimedes' division of circuit tracks and estimation of the extent to forge three types of gear wheels. I have proposed to the Kremlin to put up a plaque with an inscription where the clock tower once stood."

Along with Pachomius the Serb, Lazar is one of the notable Serbs in Russian medieval history.

== See also ==
- List of Moscow Kremlin towers
- Teodosije the Hilandarian (1246–1328), one of the most important Serbian writers in the Middle Ages
- Elder Grigorije (fl. 1310–1355), builder of Saint Archangels Monastery
- Antonije Bagaš (fl. 1356–1366), bought and restored the Agiou Pavlou monastery
- Pachomius the Serb (fl. 1440s–1484), hagiographer of the Russian Church

== Annotations ==
1. His name was Lazar (Russian and Serbian: Лазар). Russian documents call him Monk Lazar the Serb (чернец Лазарь Сербии, Србин Лазар черњец). Modern sources also specifically call him Lazar the Serb (Russian: Лазарь Сербии, Лазар Серб, Serbian: Србин Лазар), Lazar the Hilandarian (Russian: Лазар Хиландарец, Serbian: Лазар Хиландарац) and Monk Lazar (Serbian: Монах Лазар).
