= Constantine of Kostenets =

Bulgarian writer (c. 1380 – after 1431)

- Константин Костенечки
- Born: c. 1380 likely Kostenets
- Died: after 1431
- Occupation: Writer
- Writing career
- Notable work: Life of Despot Stefan Lazarević

Constantine of Kostenets (Bulgarian: Константин Костенечки, romanized: Konstantin Kostenechki; c. 1380 – after 1431), also known as Constantine the Philosopher (Serbian: Константин Филозоф / Konstantin Filozof), was a medieval Bulgarian writer and chronicler, who spent most of his life in the Serbian Despotate. He is best known for his biography of Serbian despot Stefan Lazarević, which George Ostrogorsky described as "the most important historical work of old Serbian literature", and for writing the first Serbian philological study, Skazanije o pismeneh (A History on the Letters). He followed the writing style of the Old Serbian "vita", first popularized in the Serbian scriptoria of the 12th century. When the Turks invaded Bulgaria, Serbia granted refuge to such men of letters as Kostonets, Grigorije Camblak, and Ioasaf of Vidin.

== Biography ==
Constantine was born in Bulgaria, probably in Kostenets. In his youth, he attended school in the capital Veliko Tarnovo, and was taught by Andronik, a pupil of Patriarch Evtimiy of Bulgaria. He continued his studies on Mount Athos and in Constantinople. The Ottoman conquest of Tarnovo in 1393 drove him away and he settled in Stefan Lazarević's Serbian Despotate, probably around 1402. He was warmly welcomed by the Despot, also a man of letters and a benefactor of education, and was given the position of educator at his palace in Belgrade. Constantine also frequented the Manasija monastery, where he helped establish the Serbian "Resava School" of literature. His high education, life experience and traveling earned him the nickname of "Filozof" (Philosopher), after Saint Cyril the Philosopher. On top of the travels in his youth, he traveled to the Holy Land and, judging by his description of three missions to the palaces of eastern rulers (Timur, Musa and Mehmed I), he may also have participated.

After the Despot's death in 1427, Constantine left Belgrade and entered into the service of kesar Uglješa Vlatković, in the area of Vranje, where he later died.

Constantine's work had a tremendous impact on medieval Serbian literature and education. He introduced many classical Greek elements of literature and philosophy. His frequent citing of ancient philosophers and comparisons of the Despot in the Biography caused many to consider him a precursor to the Renaissance, which, due to the Ottoman conquest, never occurred in Serbian culture.

== Biography of Despot Stefan Lazarević ==
After Despot Stefan died in 1427, Nikon I, Serbian Patriarch ordered Constantine to write the Despot's biography. That order was only fulfilled four years later, after Stefan himself allegedly appeared in Constantine's dream and restated Nikon's order. The biography is one of the most interesting in the old Serbian literature because it contains not only facts about the Despot's life, but also geographic information and thorough descriptions of numerous historical events. He was apparently inspired by the imperial chronicles of Byzantine historians. The Biography of Despot Stefan Lazarević (Serbian: Житије деспота Стефана Лазаревића / Žitije despota Stefana Lazarevića) begins with a geographic description of Serbia's natural beauties, going on to describe its residents, praising their character but also mourning their forthcoming fall to the Turks. An exhaustive story of court events and the Despot's life follows, with numerous Biblical and classical references and numerous historical data which have proven invaluable to later historians. On several occasions, Constantine used acrostics, with three masterpiece instances: in the introduction verses, in the titles of central chapters, and in the verses telling of his sorrow for the deceased Despot.

== Legacy ==
Constantine of Kostenets, Pachomius the Serb, Cyprian, Metropolitan of Kiev, and Gregory Tsamblak were able to continue their literary activities virtually unhampered by any linguistic barrier when moving from the Balkans to Imperial Russia, no different than the role of Latin literature in the Roman Catholic part of medieval Europe. Constantine spoke and wrote a language which could not be identified with either the Bulgarian or Serbian vernaculars. Therefore, it was only natural for medieval Serbian biographers to turn for models to the body of existing vitae written in either Slavonic-Serbian or Church Slavonic language.

== See also ==
- Gregory Tsamblak
- Nicodemus of Tismana

== Sources ==
- Birnbaum, Henrik (1972). "Byzantine Tradition Transformed: The Old Serbian Vita". Aspects of the Balkans: Continuity and Change. The Hague and Paris: Mouton. pp. 243–284.
- Ćirković, Sima (2004). The Serbs. Malden: Blackwell Publishing. ISBN 9781405142915.
- Fine, John Van Antwerp Jr. (1994) [1987]. The Late Medieval Balkans: A Critical Survey from the Late Twelfth Century to the Ottoman Conquest. Ann Arbor, Michigan: University of Michigan Press. ISBN 0472082604.
- Grickat-Radulović, Irena (1993). "Serbian Medieval Literary Language". Serbs in European Civilization. Belgrade: Nova, Serbian Academy of Sciences and Arts, Institute for Balkan Studies. pp. 146–150. ISBN 9788675830153.
- Radošević, Ninoslava (1986). "Laudes Serbiae: The Life of Despot Stephan Lazarević by Constantine the Philosopher". Зборник радова Византолошког института (in French). 24–25: 445–451.
