= Teodosije the Hilandarian =

Serbian Orthodox clergyman and writer

- Теодосије Хиландарац
- Born: 1246; Kingdom of Serbia
- Died: 1328 (aged c. 82); Hilandar
- Occupations: monk, scribe, hagiographer
- Writing career
- Language: Serbian Old Church Slavonic
- Years active: 1292–1310

Teodosije the Hilandarian or Theodosije of Hilandar (Serbian: Теодосије Хиландарац/Teodosije Hilandarac; 1246–1328) was a Serbian Orthodox clergyman and one of the most important Serbian writers in the Middle Ages; the Serbian Academy of Sciences and Arts named him one of the 100 most prominent Serbs.

== Biography ==
He was born in around 1246. He was a monk of Hilandar (hence his epithet), the Serbian monastery of Mount Athos, and a priest of King Stefan Uroš III Dečanski (r. 1322–31). He focused on expanding and strengthening the cult of St. Simeon the Myrrhflowing (Stefan Nemanja) (r. 1166–1196), and Saint Sava, who had created the main focus of the Serb ethnic and cultural identity. In the period between 1292 and 1310 he wrote a Common Canon to Christ, St. Simeon Nemanja and St. Sava, The Life of Saint Sava, Encomium to Ss. Simeon and Sava, Common Canon to Ss. Simeon and Sava, Canon to Ss. Simeon and Sava, The Life of St. Peter of Koriš, Office for St. Sava, and Office for St. Peter of Koriš.

Teodosije's biography The Life of St. Sava as compared to Domentijan's, is written in less ornamented style and relatively free from mystical and theological elements. He wrote several canons, liturgical, and other works dedicated to Saints Simeon and Sava, as well as Life of St. Peter of Korish, which is viewed as the artistically most successful art of old Serbian literature. In the work, as in the Life of St. Sava, despite the strict form of biographies, it was written with a fluent and vivid style of storytelling. The narrative is sometimes dramatic, and always from the character's point of view. Because of such tendencies, similar to Dostoevsky, who also drew literary skills from hagiographic literature, this work has been called a "novel", and Theodosius the first Serbian novelist.

Teodosije's Life of St. Sava, is viewed as one of the first complex parts in old Serbian literature. Teodosije was also an innovator, one who tells the many times told story, through new compositional structure of sentences and word processing, and refresh the story. In this way, the Serbian historical characters were taken from the literary monotony in which the writers of the past centuries had put them in, enlightening them from different angles. He is included in The 100 most prominent Serbs.

Teodosije is one of the few medieval writers whose works we can find explicit poetic views. They coincide with known Horace's thinking about the function of literature, but the ways in which these attitudes are brought into the Serbian medieval times are very specific. Their roots in ancient Greece (Aristotle), which is elaborated on by Hellenistic writers, and through late antique and early Byzantine, and later Athonite, enters the width of Teodosije.

== See also ==
- Saint Sava
- Jefimija
- Princess Milica of Serbia
- Domentijan
- Danilo II, Serbian Archbishop
- Stefan Dušan
