= List of people from Serbia =

List of people from Serbia is a list of notable people from Serbia. The list contains names of people who are associated with Serbia and its territory by their place of birth, and also by naturalization, domicile, citizenship or some other similar connection, modern or historical. List is territorially defined, and includes all people from Serbia, regardless of their ethnic, linguistic, religious or some other personal distinctions.

== Royalty and nobility ==
=== Serbian monarchs ===
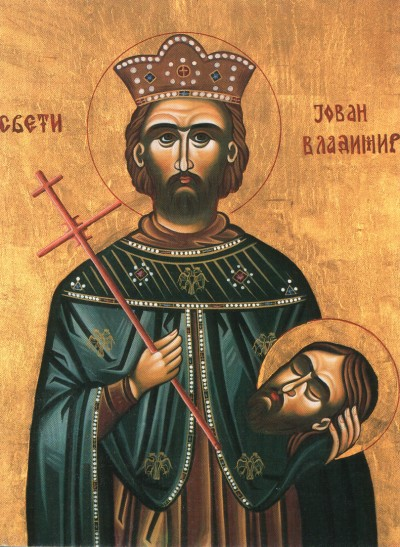
Jovan Vladimir

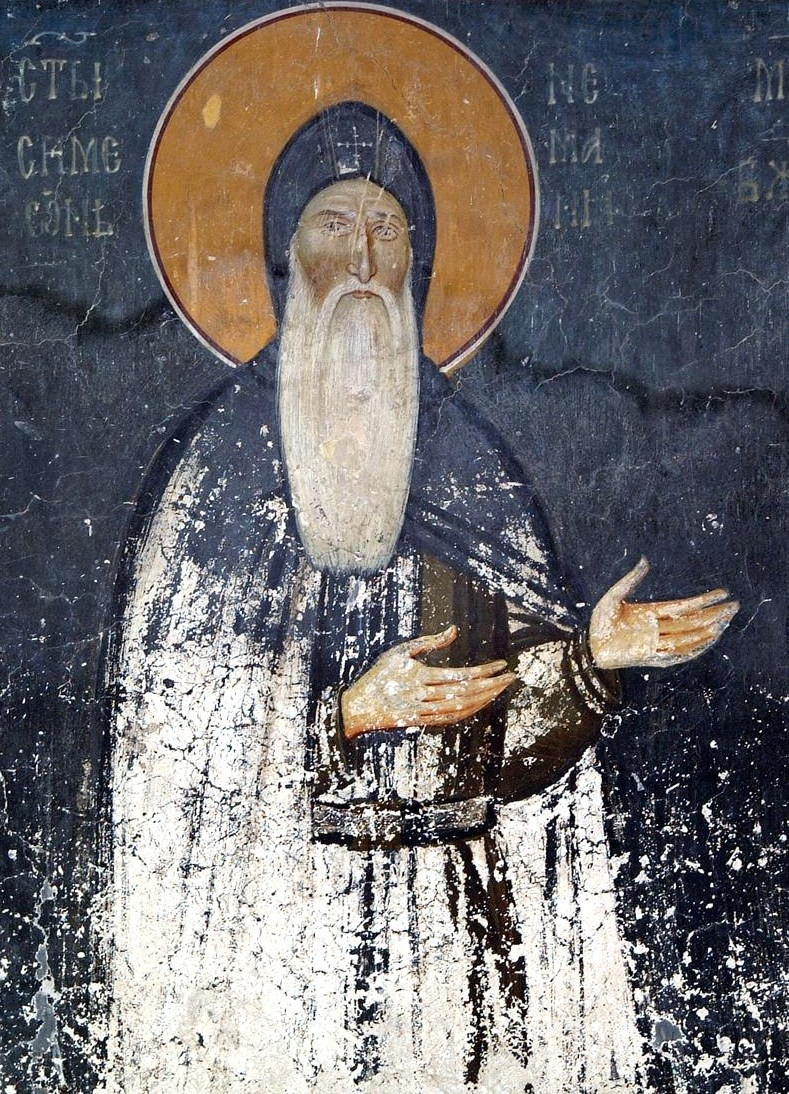
Saint Simeon (Stefan Nemanja)

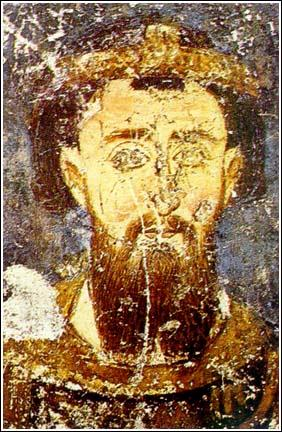
Stefan the First-Crowned

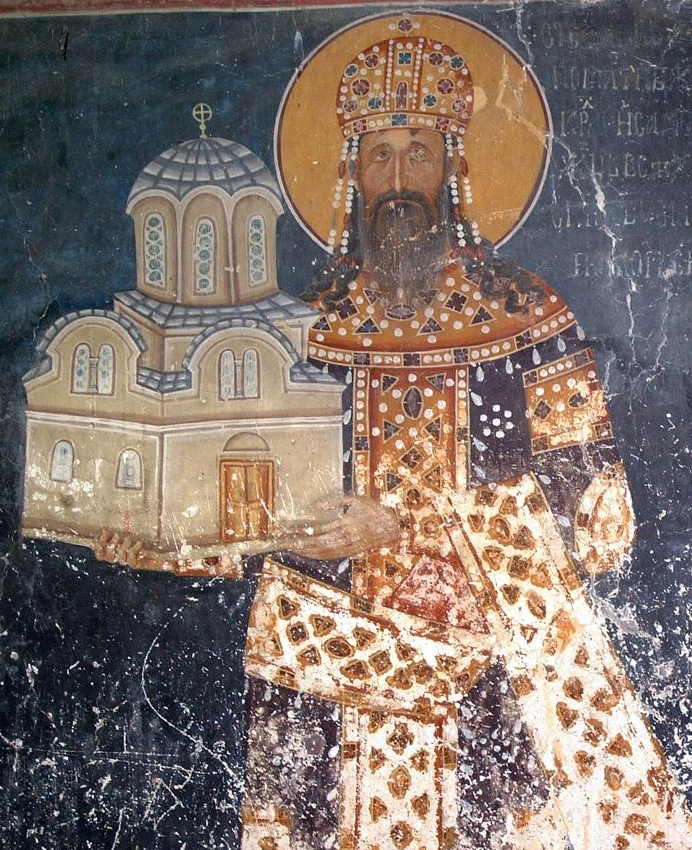
Stefan Milutin

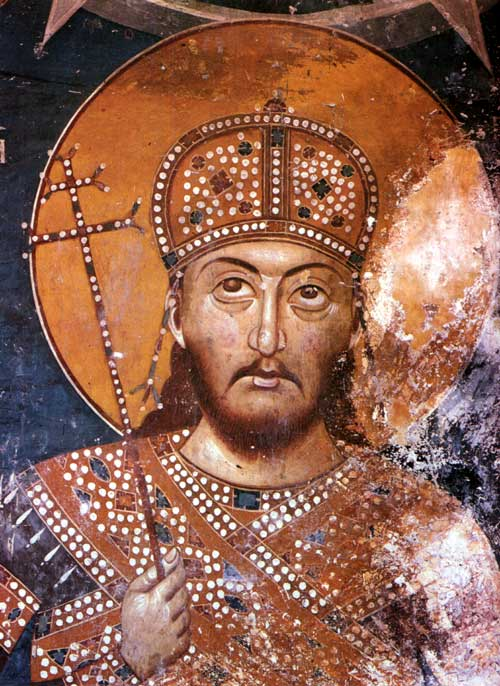
Stefan Dušan

- Unknown Archon
- Višeslav
- Radoslav
- Prosigoj
- Vlastimir
- Mutimir
- Pribislav
- Petar
- Pavle
- Zaharija
- Časlav
- Beloje
- Krajina Belojević
- Hvalimir Belojević
- Čučimir Belojević
- Petar of Duklja
- Jovan Vladimir
- Stefan Vojislav
- Mihailo Vojislavljević
- Constantine Bodin
- Vukan
- Uroš I
- Uroš II
- Beloš
- Desa
- Tihomir
- Stefan Nemanja
- Vukan Nemanjić
- Stefan the First-Crowned
- Stefan Radoslav
- Stefan Vladislav
- Stefan Uroš I
- Stefan Dragutin
- Stefan Milutin
- Vladislav, King of Syrmia
- Stefan Dečanski
- Stefan Dušan
- Stefan Uroš V
- Simeon Uroš
- Jovan Uroš

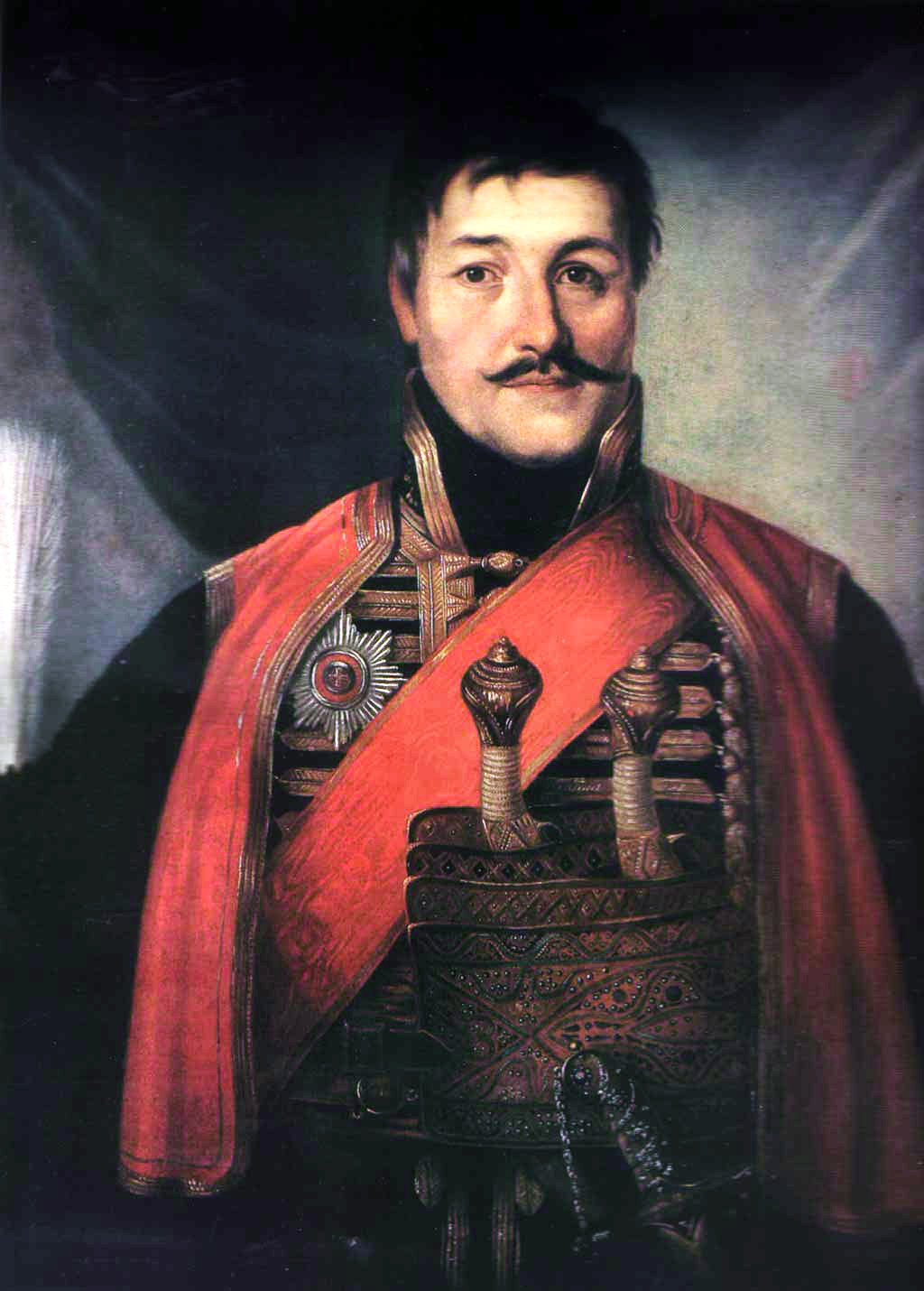
Karađorđe

Miloš Obrenović

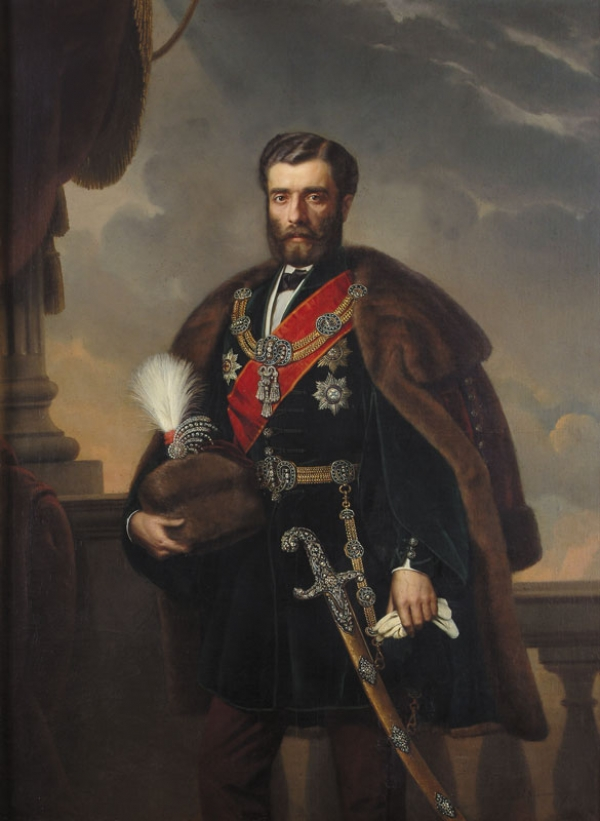
Mihailo Obrenović

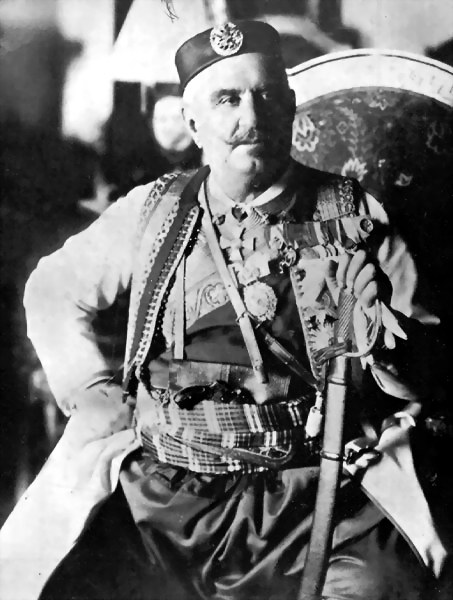
Nikola I Petrović-Njegoš

Petar I Karađorđević

- Vukašin of Serbia
- Prince Marko
- Lazar of Serbia
- Đurađ I Balšić
- Balša II
- Vuk Branković
- Đurađ II Balšić
- Nikola Altomanović
- Jovan Dragaš
- Konstantin Dejanović
- Stefan Lazarević
- Balša III
- Đurađ Branković
- Stefan Crnojević
- Lazar Branković
- Stefan Branković
- Ivan Crnojević
- Vuk Grgurević
- Đorđe Branković
- Đurađ Crnojević
- Jovan Branković
- Stefan II Crnojević
- Radič Božić
- Pavle Bakić
- Stefan Štiljanović
- Jovan Nenad
- Radoslav Čelnik
- Karađorđe
- Miloš Obrenović
- Milan Obrenović II
- Mihailo Obrenović
- Alexander Karađorđević
- Danilo I, Prince of Montenegro
- Nikola I Petrović-Njegoš
- Milan I of Serbia
- Alexander I of Serbia
- Peter I of Serbia
- Alexander I of Yugoslavia
- Prince Paul of Yugoslavia
- Peter II of Yugoslavia

=== Serbian princesses ===
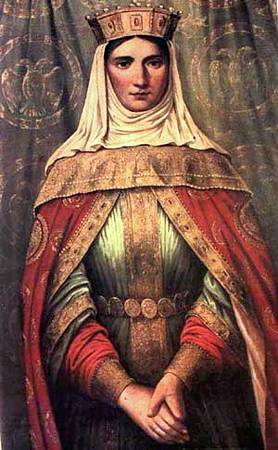
Princess Milica of Serbia

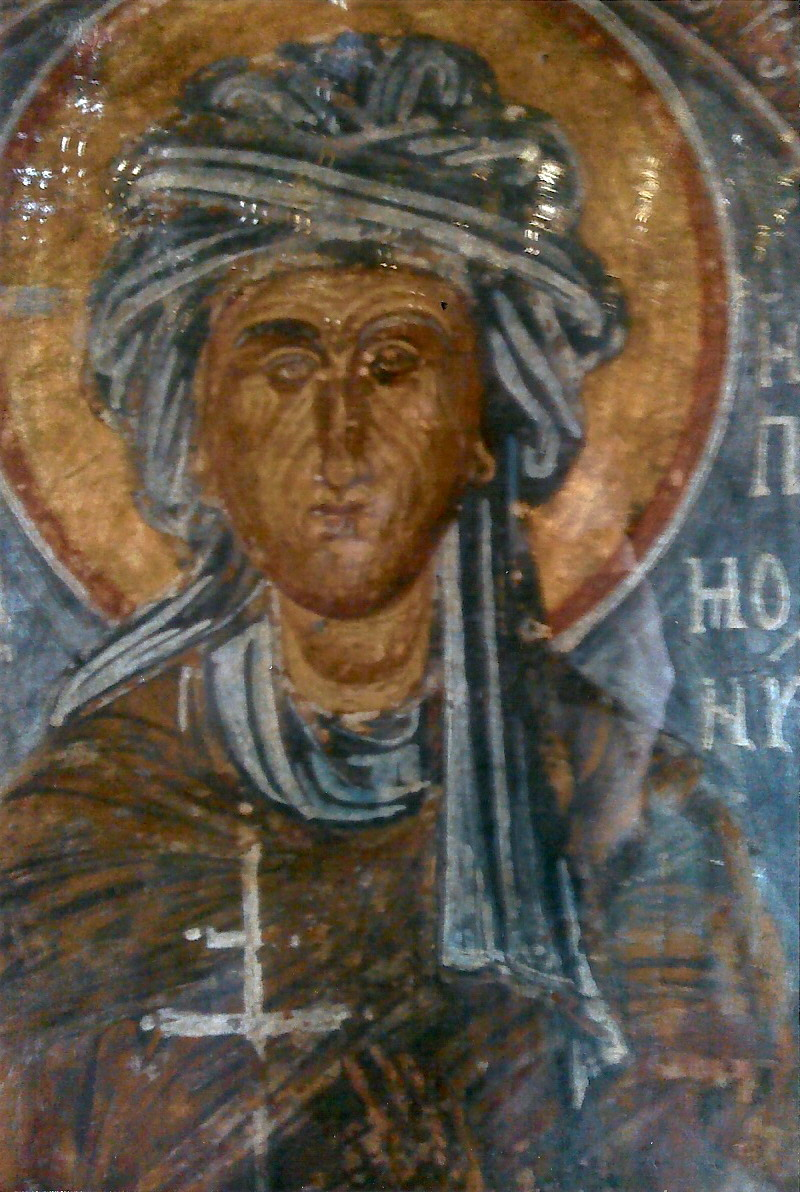
Helena Dragaš

- Jelena Vukanović, (b. after 1109 – after 1146), Queen of Hungary
- Jelisaveta Nemanjić, (fl. 1270 – died 1331), Baness of Bosnia
- Princess Milica of Serbia, (ca. 1335–1405)
- Jelena Balšić (1365/1366–1443), Lady of Zeta; Grand Duchess of Hum
- Ana-Neda, Empress of Bulgaria
- Dragana of Serbia, Empress of Bulgaria
- Helena Dragaš, (c. 1372 – 23 March 1450), Byzantine empress, mother of emperors John VIII Palaiologos and Constantine XI Palaiologos
- Olivera Lazarević, Ottoman consort
- Mara Branković, Ottoman consort
- Kantakuzina Katarina Branković (1418/19 – 1492), countess of County of Celje
- Mara Branković, last Queen of Bosnia and Despoina of Serbia
- Jelena Rareš, princess of Moldavia, regent in 1551–1553
- Milica Despina of Wallachia, (c. 1485–1554), Princess of Wallachia, regent in Wallachia in 1521–1522
- Ana Jakšić Glinska, mother of Elena Glinskaya and grandmother of Tsar Ivan the Terrible
- Jelena Jakšić, titular Despotissa of Serbia, wife of Despot Jovan Branković
- Şehsuvar Sultan, Ottoman consort
- Ljubica Vukomanović, (September 1788 – 26 May 1843), Princess of Serbia
- Persida Nenadović, (15 February 1813 – 29 March 1873), Princess of Serbia
- Draga Mašin, (11 September 1864 – 11 June 1903), Queen of Serbia

== Politicians and diplomats ==
=== 19th and the 20th century ===
- Petar Ičko (1775–1808), Karageorge's political envoy to Constantinople.
- Petar Nikolajević Moler
- Toma Vučić-Perišić
- Avram Petronijević
- Aleksa Simić
- Ljubomir Kaljević
- Milan Piroćanac
- Sava Grujić
- Jovan Avakumović
- Petar Velimirović
- Đorđe Simić
- Milutin Garašanin
- Stojan Novaković
- Jovan Ristić
- Svetozar Miletić
- Ilija Garašanin
- Milutin Garašanin
- Nikola Hristić
- Jovan Marinović
- Pavle Beljanski, diplomat and art connoisseur
- Milivoje Petrović Blaznavac
- Nikola Pašić (Radical/Prime Minister)
- Svetomir Nikolajević
- Jaša Prodanović
- Lazar Arsenijević Batalaka
- Nikola Uzunović
- Bogoljub Jevtić
- Puniša Račić
- Dr. Stevan Moljević
- Dr. Živko Topalović
- Dimitrije Ljotić (Nationalist/Collaborationist during World War II)
- Ljubomir Davidović (Democrat)
- Milan Grol
- Dušan Simović
- Slobodan Jovanović
- Milovan Milovanović, Serbian politician, diplomat and constitutional lawyer
- Momčilo Ninčić
- Dragoljub Mićunović
- Svetozar Pribićević (Democrat)
- Velimir Vukićević (Radical/Prime Minister)
- Milan Stojadinović (Radical/Prime Minister)
- Dragiša Cvetković (Radical)
- Dobrica Matković (Radical)
- Vladimir Dedijer (Communist)
- Svetozar Marković (Socialist)
- Svetozar Delić (Among the first Communists who became Mayor of Zagreb)
- Veljko Milatović (Communist; and alleged killer of Krsto Zrnov Popović)
- Miloš Minić (Communist)
- Latinka Perović (Communist)
- Milentije Popović (Communist)
- Aleksandar Ranković(Communist)
- Ivan Stambolić (Communist)
- Đorđe Vojnović
- Kosta Taušanović
- Dragiša Cvetković (pre-World War II prime minister)

=== Modern times ===
- Siniša Mali
- Tomislav Nikolić, former President of Serbia
- Boris Tadić, former President of Serbia
- Mirko Cvetković, former Prime Minister of Serbia
- Nenad Bogdanović
- Predrag Bubalo
- Dragan Čavić
- Nebojša Čović
- Ivica Dačić, minister of foreign affairs and former Prime Minister of Serbia
- Vojislav Koštunica, former Prime Minister of Serbia and former President of Yugoslavia
- Miroljub Labus
- Slobodan Lalović
- Zoran Lončar
- Predrag Marković
- Dejan Mihajlov
- Tomica Milosavljević
- Radomir Naumov
- Đurđe Ninković
- Milan Panić, former Prime Minister of Yugoslavia
- Borislav Paravac
- Milan Parivodić
- Mirko Šarović
- Goran Svilanović
- Veroljub Stevanović
- Vojislav Šešelj
- Aleksandar Vučić, current President of Serbia
- Slobodan Vuksanović
- Velimir Ilić
- Andrija Mandić, leader of Serbs in Montenegro
- Vuk Drašković
- Radoman Bozovic
- Borisav Jović, former president of Yugoslavia)
- Slobodan Milošević
- Peter, Hereditary Prince of Yugoslavia

== Military ==
=== Medieval and Early modern period ===
- Novak Grebostrek
- Miloš Obilić, knight and hero
- Ivan Kosančić, knight
- Milan Toplica, knight
- Stanislav Sočivica (1715–1777), Serbian rebel leader, active in Bosnia and Herzegovina and Montenegro.
- Koča Andjelković (1755–1788), Austrian volunteer and Serbian rebel leader.

=== Modern ===
19th-century revolutionaries

See: List of Serbian Revolutionaries

- Karađorđe (1762–1817), leader of the First Serbian Uprising (1804–13)
- Kara-Marko Vasić, Serbian revolutionary who participated in the First Serbian Uprising
- Hadži-Prodan Gligorijević (1760–1825), commander in the First Serbian Uprising and volunteer in the Greek War of Independence
- Mladen Milovanović, commander in the First Serbian Uprising
- Hajduk Veljko Petrović, commander in the First Serbian Uprising
- Čolak-Anta Simeonović, commander in the First Serbian Uprising
- Stanoje Stamatović Glavaš, commander in the First Serbian Uprising
- Stevan Sinđelić, commander in the First Serbian Uprising
- Petar Dobrnjac, commander in the First Serbian Uprising
- Sima Nenadović, commander in the First Serbian Uprising
- Matija Nenadović, commander in the First Serbian Uprising
- Jakov Nenadović, commander in the First Serbian Uprising
- Novica Cerović (1805–1895), noted for his successful assault against a local Muslim tyrant precipitating The Death of Smail-aga Čengić under the auspices of Petar II Petrović-Njegoš thereby freeing parts of Herzegovina from the Ottoman Empire and joining them to the Principality of Montenegro. His heroism and the death of Smail-aga Čengić was the theme of Ivan Mažuranić's epic poem celebrating the struggle for freedom.
- Marko Miljanov, Montenegrin commander
- Vasos Mavrovouniotis, volunteer in the Greek War of Independence
- Jovan Mišković, commander in the Serbian-Turkish Wars (1876–1878)
- Rista Cvetković-Božinče
- Aksentije Bacetić

Balkan Wars and World War I

- Ljubomir Kovačević
- Gavro Vuković
- General Petar Bojović
- General Božidar Janković
- General Živojin Mišić
- General Radomir Putnik
- General Stepa Stepanović
- General Jovan Atanacković
- General Vojin Popović, also known as Vojvoda Vuk.
- Major Dragutin Gavrilović
- Milunka Savić, war heroine of the 1913 Balkan War and World War I, wounded nine times.
- Sofija Jovanović, war heroine of the 1913 Balkan War and World War I
- Stanislav Sondermayer, Serbian World War I soldier, the youngest to be killed in action
- Tadija Sondermajer, Serbian aviator, aeronautical engineer, founder and director of Aeroput, Yugoslavia's first airline

World War II

- General Milan Nedić
- Dimitrije Ljotić
- Kosta Mušicki
- Milan Spasić, naval hero of World War II
- Nikola Kavaja
- General Draža Mihailović
- General Nikola Ljubičić
- General Kosta Nađ
- General Dušan Simović
- Jezdimir Dangić

Yugoslav wars

- General Blagoje Adžić
- General Dragoljub Ojdanić
- General Ljubiša Jokić
- General Vladimir Lazarević
- General Nebojša Pavković
- General Života Panić
- General Dragan Paskaš
- General Aleksandar Vasiljević
- Jovica Stanišić, intelligence officer and head of the State Security Service (SDB) (1992–1998)

=== Foreign service ===
Various states

- Evgenije Popović fought in a detachment commanded by Giuseppe Garibaldi, Italy.
- Mićo Ljubibratić also fought with Giuseppe Garibaldi.
- Ilija Monte Radlovic served in the British Army during World War II.
- Vito Marija Bettera-Vodopić (1771–1841) in the service of Imperial Russia, died as an Austrian prisoner in occupied-Ukraine.
- Janos Damjanich (1804–1849), Hungarian General
- Jakov Ignjatović, Hungary
- Sebo Vukovics, Hungary
- Dome Sztojay, Hungary
- Paul Davidovich, Austria-Hungary
- Adam Bajalics von Bajahaza, Austria-Hungary
- Petar Preradović, Austrian general
- Emil Vojnović, Austrian general and military historian
- Arsenije Sečujac, Austrian general
- Jeronim Ljubibratić, Austrian Field marshal
- Paul von Radivojevich, Austrian general
- Svetozar Boroević, Baron von Bojna, Austro-Hungarian and Croatian field marshal of Serbian origin
- Stevan Šupljikac Voivod (Duke) of Serbian Vojvodina (1848), Austria-Hungary
- Karl Paul von Quosdanovich, Austrian general
- Peter Vitus von Quosdanovich, Austrian Field marshal
- Emil Uzelac first joined the Austrian Air Force of Austro-Hungarian Empire.
- King Peter I of Serbia led his government, army, and civilian refugees through the Montenegrin and Albanian mountains to the Adriatic seacoast where they were eventually transported by Allied ships to Corfu, Vido and Thessaloniki in World War I Greece (Government-in-Exile).
- Stojan Janković led Serbs from Dalmatia and Montenegro in the Cretan War of 1645–1669 on the side of the Republic of Venice.
- Starina Novak, Hajduk and Moldavian ally
- Constantin Brancoveanu, Wallachia
- At the end of the 15th century, Raci warriors came to the Polish Kingdom and played an important role in forming the Polish hussars.
- Constantine Tikh of Bulgaria
- Jovan Monasterlija led Serbian Militia in the name of Leopold I, Holy Roman Emperor against the Turks.
- Ilija Perajica was a 17th-century freedom-fighter
- Vuk Isakovič (1696–1759) was Serb military commander in the Austrian-Ottoman Wars.
- Petar Marinovich, France

Russian Empire

- Petar Tekelija, General-in-Chief, achieved the highest rank among the Serbs who served in the Imperial Russian Army, In the service of Peter the Great and his daughter Elizabeth of Russia
- Semyon Zorich (1743–1799) distinguished himself in the Seven Years' War and the first Russo-Turkish War. He was the recipient of the Order of St. George on Pyotr Rumyantsev's recommendation. He was promoted to Lieutenant-General (1797). In the service of Catherine the Great
- Mikhail Andreyevich Miloradovich (1771–1825) In the service of Tsar Alexander I during the French invasion of Russia
- Georgi Emmanuel
- Nikolay Depreradovich
- Rajko Depreradović
- Andrei Miloradovich
- Ivan Adamovich
- Jovan Horvat
- Simeon Piščević
- Jovan Albanez
- Simeon Končarević
- Jovan Šević
- Ilya Duka
- Dmitry Horvat
- Dejan Subotić
- Ivan Lukačević
- Radola Gajda, in the service of Czar Nicholas II of Russia during the Great War and after
- John of Shanghai and San Francisco, In the service of Czar Nicholas II of Russia during the Great War and after
- John of Tobolsk, in the service of Czar Nicholas II of Russia during the Great War and after
- Nikolay Gerasimovich Kuznetsov, served during the Great Patriotic War
- Aleksej Jelačić, served during the Great Patriotic War
- Aleksa Dundić
- Nikolai Dimitrievich Dabić

Ottoman Empire

- Veli Mahmud Pasha, Ottoman Grand Vizier 1456–68 and 1472–74, Serbian-Byzantine from Novo Brdo.
- Zagan Pasha, Ottoman Grand Vizier from 1453 to 1456
- Deli Husrev Pasha, Ottoman statesman and second vizier
- Hadım Ali Pasha, Ottoman Grand Vizier from 1501 to 1503 and 1506 to 1511
- Lala Mustafa Pasha, Ottoman Grand Vizier in 1580
- Semiz Ali Pasha, Ottoman Grand Vizier from 1561 to 1565
- Sokolluzade Lala Mehmed Pasha, Ottoman Grand Vizier from 1604 to 1606
- Boşnak Derviş Mehmed Pasha, Ottoman Grand Vizier during 1606
- Nevesinli Salih Pasha, Ottoman Grand Vizier from 1645 to 1647
- Kara Musa Pasha, Ottoman Grand Vizier during 1647
- Sarı Süleyman Pasha, Ottoman Grand Vizier from 1685 to 1687
- Daltaban Mustafa Pasha, Ottoman Grand Vizier from 1702 to 1703
- Damat Melek Mehmed Pasha, Ottoman Grand Vizier from 1792 to 1794
- Ivaz Mehmed Pasha, Ottoman Grand Vizier from 1739 to 1740
- Yavuz Ali Pasha, Ottoman Governor of Egypt from 1601 to 1603
- George Berovich, Governor-General of Crete and Prince of Samos.
- Gedik Ahmed Pasha, Grand Vizier 1474–77. Serbian from Vranje.
- Omar Pasha (Serbian: Mihajlo Latas; 1806–1871), general, convert
- Mara Branković, wife of Murad II, very influential in imperial affairs, ambassador to Venice
- Aşub Sultan, originally Katarina, consort of Sultan Ibrahim I and mother of Sultan Suleiman II.
- Şehsuvar Sultan, originally Maria, consort of Sultan Mustafa II (r. 1695–1703) and mother of Sultan Osman III (r. 1754–1757).
- Olivera Despina, daughter of Prince Lazar, consort of Sultan Bayezid I.
- Osman Aga of Temesvar (1670–1725), Ottoman commander
- Meylişah Hatun, Consort to Sultan Osman II
- Skenderbeg Crnojević
- George Berovich
- Aganlija
- Kučuk-Alija
- Sali Aga

USA

For Serbian American military personnel, see this list

== Religion ==
Heads of the Serbian Orthodox Church

- Saint Sava
- Saint Arsenije I Sremac (1233–1263)
- Saint Sava II (1263–1271)
- Archbishop Danilo I (1271–1272)
- Joanikije I (1272–1276)
- Saint Jevstatije I (1279–1286)
- Saint Jakov (1286–1292)
- Saint Jevstatije II (1292–1309)
- Saint Sava III (1309–1316)
- Saint Nikodim I (1316–1324)
- Saint Danilo II (1324–1337)
- Saint Joanikije II (1338–1345) and as first Serbian patriarch (1346–1354)
- Patriarch Sava IV (1354–1375)
- Jefrem (1375–1380) and (1389–1390)
- Spiridon (1380–11 August 1389)
- Danilo III (1390–1396)
- Patriarch Arsenije III Crnojević (1672–1690)
- Patriarch Kalinik I (1691–1710)
- Patriarch Arsenije IV Jovanović Šakabenta (1726–1737)
- Serbian Patriarch Joanikije III (1739–1746)
- Patriarch Kalinik II (1765–1766)
- Serbian Patriarch Dimitrije (1920–1930)
- Serbian Patriarch Varnava (1930–1937)
- Serbian Patriarch Gavrilo V (1838–1950)
- Serbian Patriarch Vikentije II (1950–1958)
- Serbian Patriarch German (1958–1990)
- Serbian Patriarch Pavle (1990–2009)
- Serbian Patriarch Irinej (2010–20??)
- Saint Angelina (died 1520), despotess consort of Stephen Branković, wrote a hagiography
- Stefan Brankovic
- Lazar Brankovic
- Jovan Vladimir
- Lazar of Serbia
- Nikolaj Velimirović
- Slobodan Šiljak
- Stefan Stiljanovic
- Theodor Komogovinski
- Đorđe Bogić (1911–1941), parish priest of Našice, was tortured and slain by the Ustasha on the order of a Roman Catholic priest of the same village
- Mitrofan Ban, Exarch, receiver of the Obilić medal in the Montenegrin-Ottoman War 1876–1878
- Saint Platon of Banja Luka
- Dositej Vasić

Theologians

- Justin Popović
- Josif Rajačić
- Nikolaj Velimirović
- Nikodim Milaš
- Amfilohije Radović

== Artists ==
=== Visual artists ===
==== Architects ====
- Aleksandar Deroko, architect, artist, professor and author
- Aleksandar Đokić, architect known for Brutalist and postmodernist styles
- Bogdan Bogdanović, architect, urbanist and essayist, designed monumental concrete sculpture in Jasenovac
- Dragiša Brašovan, modernist architect, leading architect of the early 20th century in Yugoslavia
- Ivan Antić, architect and academic, considered one of the former Yugoslavia's best post-World War 2 architects
- Konstantin Jovanović, architect who designed National assemblies of Serbia and Bulgaria and National Bank of Serbia
- Jelisaveta Načić, pioneer in women's architecture in Serbia
- Mihailo Janković, architect who designed several important structures in Serbia
- Milan Zloković, architect, founder of the Group of Architects of Modern Expressions.
- Momčilo Tapavica, designer of Novi Sad's Matica Srpska building; also 1st Serb to win an Olympic medal at 1st modern Olympic Games (Athens, Greece, 1896)
- Svetozar Ivačković, post-Romantic architect
- Zoran Manević, prominent Serbian architecture historian
- Ilija Arnautović, Slovene architect (of Serb origin), known for his projects during the period of Slovenian socialism (1960–1980)
- Dimitrije T. Leko, Serbian architect and urbanist
- Dubravka Sekulić, architect and academic
- Zoran Bojović (architect) (born 1936), architect for Energoprojekt, worked in Africa
- Milica Šterić (born 1914), architect for Energoprojekt, built post-World War II power plants
- Ljiljana Bakić (born 1939), Serbian architect
- Ivanka Raspopović (born 1930), Serbian architect
- Maja Vidaković Lalić, architect
- Jovanka Bončić-Katerinić (born 1887), architect, 1st woman engineer in Germany
- Milan Minić (architect), architect
- Ksenija Bulatović, architect
- Svetlana Kana Radević, architect
- Alexis Josic (born 1921), French architect

==== Sculptors ====
- Petar Ubavkić (1852–1910), recognized as the first sculptor of modern Serbia
- Drinka Radovanović (born 1943), author of many monuments to national heroes
- Đorđe Jovanović (1861–1953), won prizes at the World Exhibitions in Paris 1889 and 1900 for the works "Gusle" and "Kosovo Monument"
- Jovan Soldatović (1920–2005), author of Monument of the 1942 raid victims near Žabalj
- Olga Jevrić (born 1922), awarded sculptor
- Matija Vuković (1925–1985), awarded sculptor
- Mirjana Isaković (born 1936), former professor at the Faculty of Applied Arts
- Vasilije Stojanović Vasa (born 1955), awarded sculptor and painter
- Bojan Mikulić (born 1980), recipient of the Medal of Merit to the People
- Vukosava Velimirović
- Miodrag Živković

==== Painters, cartoonists, illustrators ====
- Michael Astrapas and Eutychios (fl. 1294–1317), Greek painters from Thessaloniki. They were invited by Serbian ruler Stefan Milutin (c. 1253–1321) and commissioned to paint frescoes at the following locations: Church of Saint Clement at Ohrid (1294–1295); Church of Saint Niketas at Čucer Sandevo (before 1316); Church of Holy Virgin of Ljeviša in Prizren (1307); and Church of Saint George at Staro Nagoričane (1317)
- Đorđe Mitrofanović (ca. 1550–1630), Serbian fresco painter and muralist who travelled and worked throughout the Balkans and the Levant.
- Tripo Kokolja (1661–1713), Venetian painter, born in Perast, who is remembered for his still life and landscape painting.
- Hristofor Žefarović (1710–1753)
- Jovan Četirević Grabovan (1720–1781)
- Dimitrije Bačević (1735–1770)
- Teodor Kračun (1730–1781)
- Jakov Orfelin, Baroque painter
- Nikola Nešković (1740–1789)
- Teodor Ilić Češljar (1746–1793)
- Stefan Gavrilović (c. 1750–1823)
- Jovan Pačić (1771–1849)
- Pavel Đurković (1772–1830)
- Petar Nikolajević Moler (1775–1816), revolutionary and painter
- Georgije Bakalović (1786–1843), Serbian painter
- Olja Ivanjicki, contemporary artist in fields such as sculpture, poetry, costume design, architecture and writing, but was best known for her painting.
- Đorđe Andrejević Kun (1904–1964) Serbian and Yugoslavian painter, designer of the Belgrade Coat of Arms and reputedly designed the Coat of arms of the Socialist Federal Republic of Yugoslavia and Yugoslav orders and medals
- Sreten Stojanović (1898–1960), one of the most prominent Yugoslav sculptors of the 20th century
- Dimitrije Avramović (1815–1855), painter known best for his iconostasis and frescos
- Dragan Aleksić (1901–1958), Yugoslav dadaist painter, founder of Yugo-Dada
- Janko Brašić (1906–1994), one of the foremost contributors to the naive art genre
- Marko Čelebonović (1902–1986), artist
- Petar Dobrović (1890–1942), Austro-Hungarian politician and painter. President of the short-lived Serbo-Hungarian Baranya-Baja Republic.
- Mladen Srbinović
- Uroš Đurić
- Veljko Stanojević (1878–1977)
- Đura Jakšić
- Mladen Josić
- Paja Jovanović
- Stevan Knežević
- Stevan Aleksić
- Milan Konjović
- Uroš Knežević
- Todor Švrakić (1882–1931)
- Đorđe Krstić
- Milan Konjović
- Aleksandar Luković
- Mihael Milunović
- Milo Milunović
- Marko Murat
- Viktor Mitic
- Milena Pavlović-Barili
- Đorđe Petrović
- Mina Karadžić
- Ljuba Popović
- Ljubomir Popović
- Mića Popović
- Uroš Predić
- Miodrag B. Protić
- Djordje Prudnikov
- Zora Petrović (1894–1962)
- Novak Radonić
- Radomir Reljić
- Ljubica Sokić (1914–2009)
- Radomir Stević Ras (1931–1982), Serbian painter and designer
- Sava Stojkov
- Živko Stojsavljević (1900–1978)
- Sava Šumanović
- Ivan Tabaković
- Milovan Destil Marković
- Milica Tomić
- Vladimir Veličković
- Beta Vukanović
- Rista Vukanović
- Risto Stijović (1894–1974)
- Predrag Koraksić Corax (born 1933), political caricaturist
- Aleksandar Zograf (born 1963), cartoonist
- Zoran Janjetov (born 1961), comics artist
- Aleksa Gajić (born 1974), comics artist
- Branislav Kerac (born 1952), comics artist, created Cat Claw
- Gradimir Smudja (born 1956), cartoonist in France and Italy, published acclaimed "Le Cabaret des Muses"
- Jugoslav Vlahović (born 1949), illustrator, known for many Yugoslav album covers
- Ljubomir Pavićević Fis, graphic- and industrial designer, According to the Belgrade Museum of Applied Arts, "Serbia's oldest and most well-known designer".
- Marina Abramović (born 1946), performance artist
- Ana Prvacki (born 1976), performance and installation artist
- Sasa Markovic Mikrob
- Tanja Ostojić
- Ilija Bašičević
- Jovan Bijelić
- Kossa Bokchan
- Bratsa Bonifacho
- Zuzana Chalupová
- Radomir Damnjanović Damnjan
- Jasmina Đokić
- Uroš Đurić
- Dragan Malešević Tapi
- Draginja Vlasic (1928–2011), painter
- Pavel Đurković
- Ljubinka Jovanović
- Irena Kazazić, Slovenian painter of Serbian origin
- Bernat Klein, Serbian artist of Jewish antecedents
- Stevan Knežević
- Milan Konjović
- Vladislav Lalicki
- Petar Meseldžija
- Milorad Bata Mihailović
- Predrag Milosavljević
- Mihael Milunović
- Petar Omčikus
- Dušan Otašević
- Slobodan Peladić
- Relja Penezic
- Mića Popović
- Miodrag B. Protić
- Đorđe Prudnikov
- Radomir Stević Ras
- Radomir Reljić
- Gradimir Smudja
- Vladislav Titelbah
- Vladimir Veličković
- Ana Milenkovic, Belgrade painter living in London, England
- Dragutin Inkiostri Medenjak, painter and is also considered the first interior designer in Serbia.

==== Designers ====
- Roksanda Ilincic, Serbian-born British fashion designer
- Marijana Matthäus, Serbian fashion designer
- Bata Spasojević, Serbian fashion designer
- Bojana Sentaler, Serbian-born Canadian fashion designer
- Ana Kras, Serbian-born American fashion and furniture designer, photographer
- George Styler, Serbian-born American fashion designer
- Zoran Ladicorbic, Serbian-born American fashion designer
- Gorjana Reidel, Serbian-born American jewelry designer
- Jelena Behrend, Serbian-born American jewelry designer
- Rushka Bergman, Serbian-born American fashion stylist and editor
- Jovan Jelovac, founder and director of Belgrade Design Week
- Sacha Lakic, Serbian-born French automotive and furniture designer
- Marek Djordjevic, automobile designer
- Ivana Pilja, fashion designer
- Ana Ljubinković, fashion designer
- Nevena Ivanović, fashion designer
- Ana Rajcevic, fashion artist
- Melina Džinović, fashion designer
- Aleksandar Protić, fashion designer
- Ana Šekularac, British fashion designer of Serbian descent
- Aleksandra Lalić, fashion designer
- Verica Rakocević, fashion designer
- Ivana Sert, swimsuit designer, television presenter, model
- Evica Milovanov-Penezic, glove designer
- Boris Nikolić, fashion designer
- Elena Karaman Karić, interior designer, furniture designer
- Ines Janković, fashion designer
- Sonja Jocić, fashion designer
- Mihailo Anušić, fashion designer
- Zvonko Marković, fashion designer

==== Photographers ====
- Anastas Jovanović (1817–1899), first professional photographer in Serbia
- Branibor Debeljković) (1916–2003), first photographer member of ULUS (Serbian Association of Artists)
- Srdjan Ilic, award-winning press photographer
- Boogie (Vladimir Milivojevich), Serbian-born American documentary photographer
- Dragan Tanasijević, portrait photographer
- Stevan Kragujević, photojournalist and art photographer
- Goran Tomasevic, award-winning press photographer for Reuters
- Željko Jovanović, press photographer
- Milena Rakocević, fashion photographer

=== Literature ===
==== Medieval ====
- Buća, noble family, originating in Kotor during the Middle Ages. Some of their antecedents were writers and poets.
- Miroslav of Hum, 12th-century Great Prince (Велики Жупан) of Zachlumia from 1162 to 1190, an administrative division (appanage) of the medieval Serbian Principality (Rascia) covering Herzegovina and southern Dalmatia.
- Anonymous author of the Chronicle of the Priest of Duklja, a 12th-century literary work, preserved in its Latin version only, has all the indication that it was written in Old Slavic, or, at least, that a portion of the material included in it existed previously in the Slavic language.
- Stefan Nemanja (1113–1199), issued an edict called the "Hilandar Charter" for the newly established Serbian monastery at Mount Athos.
- Stefan the First-Crowned (1165–1228), wrote "The Life of Stefan Nemanja", a biography of his father.
- Saint Sava (1174–1236), Serbian royalty and Archbishop, author of oldest known Serbian constitution – the Zakonopravilo. Also, he authored Karyes Typikon in 1199 and Studenica Typikon in 1208.
- Monk Simeon (c. 1170–1230), wrote Vukan's Gospel.
- Atanasije (scribe) (c. 1200–1265), a disciple of Saint Sava, was a Serbian monk-scribe who wrote a "Hymn to Saint Sava" and a "Eulogy to Saint Sava".
- Grigorije the Pupil, author of Miroslav Gospel and Miroslav of Hum commissioned it.
- Domentijan (c. 1210–died after 1264), Serbian scholar and writer. For most of his life, he was a monk dedicated to writing biographies of clerics, including "Life of St. Sava."
- Bratko Menaion, represents the oldest Serbian transcription of this liturgical book, discovered in the village of Banvani, and written by presbyter Bratko during the reign of king Stefan Vladislav I of Serbia in 1234.
- Stefan Uroš I of Serbia (1223–1277), author of the Ston Charter (1253).
- Dragolj Code, written in 1259 by Serbian monk Dragolj.
- Theodosius the Hilandarian (1246–1328), technically the first Serbian novelist, wrote biographies of Saint Sava and St. Simeon
- Nikodim I (c. 1250–1325), Abbot of Hilandar (later Serbian Archbishop), issued an edict (gramma) wherein he grants to the monks of the Kelion of St. Sava in Karyes a piece of land and an abandoned monastery. He translated numerous ancient texts and wrote some poetry. Also, he wrote Rodoslov (The Lives of Serbian Kings and Bishops).
- Jakov of Serres (1300–1365), author of Triodion.
- Elder Grigorije (fl. 1310–1355), Serbian nobleman and monk, possibly "Danilo's pupil" (Danilov učenik), i.e. the main author of "Žitija kraljeva i arhiepiskopa srpskih".
- Isaija the Monk (14th century), translated the works of Pseudo-Dionysius the Areopagite.
- Anonymous Athonite (also known in Serbia as Nepoznati Svetogorac; late 14th to mid-15th century) was Isaija the Monk's biographer and one of the many unidentified authors of Medieval works.
- Elder Siluan (14th century), author of a hymn to Saint Sava. Hesychasm left a strong imprint in Serbian medieval literature and art, which is evident in works by Domentijan and Teodosije the Hilandarian, but most prominently in the writings of Danilo of Peć, Isaija the Monk and Elder Siluan.
- Stefan Dušan (1308–1355), author of Dušan's Code, the second oldest preserved constitution of Serbia.
- Stanislav of Lesnovo (c. 1280–1350), wrote "Oliver's Menologion" in Serbia in 1342.
- Jefrem (patriarch) (c. 1312–1400), born in a priestly family, of Bulgarian origin, was the Patriarch of the Serbian Orthodox Church, from 1375 to 1379 and from 1389 to 1392. He was also a poet who left a large body of work, preserved in a 14th-century manuscript from Hilandar Monastery.
- Dorotej of Hilandar, wrote a charter for the monastery of Drenča in 1382.
- Cyprian, Metropolitan of Moscow (1336–1406), Bulgarian-born, Serbian clergyman who as the Metropolitan of Moscow wrote The Book of Degrees (Stepénnaya kniga), which grouped Russian monarchs in the order of their generations. The book was published in 1563.
- Rajčin Sudić (1335–after 1360), Serbian monk-scribe who lived during the time of Lord Vojihna, the father of Jefimija.
- Jefimija (1310–1405), daughter of Caesar Vojihna and widow of Jovan Uglješa Mrnjavčević, took monastic vows and is the author of three found works, including "Praise to Prince Lazar". One of the earliest European female writers.
- Saint Danilo II, wrote biographies of Serbian medieval rulers, including the biography of Jelena, the wife of King Stefan Dragutin.
- Antonije Bagaš, translated works from Greek into Serbian.
- Euthymius of Tarnovo, founder of the Tarnovo Literary School that standardized the literary texts of all Orthodox Slavs, including those in Serbia and in Kievan Rus (Ukraine, Belarus, and Russia).
- Nikola Radonja (c. 1330–1399), as monk Gerasim, served and helped with great merit Hilandar and other monasteries at Mount Athos, and authored "Gerasim Chronicle" (Gerasimov letopis).
- Princess Milica (1335–1405), consort of Prince Lazar. One of the earliest European female writers.
- Psalter of Branko Mladenović, dated 1346.
- Vrhobreznica Chronicle, also written between 1350 and 1400 by an anonymous monk-scribe.
- Jefrem (patriarch), twice Serbian patriarch, though Bulgarian born. He was also a poet.
- Maria Angelina Doukaina Palaiologina (1350–1394), Serbian writer.
- Kalist Rasoder
- Gregory Tsamblak (fl. 1409–1420), Bulgarian writer and cleric, abbot of Serbia's Visoki Dečani, wrote A Biography of and Service to St. Stephen Uroš III Dečanski of Serbia, and On the Transfer of Relics of Saint Paraskeva to Serbia.
- Danilo III, Patriarch of the Serbs (c. 1350–1400), Serbian patriarch and writer. He wrote Slovo o knezu Lazaru (Narrative About Prince Lazar).
- Nikola Stanjević (fl. 1355), commissioned monk Feoktist to write Tetravangelion at the Hilandar monastery, now on exhibit at the British Museum in London, collection No. 154.
- Jelena Balšić (1366–1443), educated Serbian noblewoman, who wrote the Gorički zbornik, correspondence between her and Nikon of Jerusalem, a monk in Gorica monastery (Jelena's monastic foundation) on Beška (Island) in Zeta under the Balšići. She is now regarded as a representative of Montenegro because she was married on what eventually became Montenegrin territory, though Montenegro did not exist in her day.
- Stefan Lazarević (1374–1427), Knez/Despot of Serbia (1389–1427), wrote biographies and poetry, one of the most important Serbian medieval writers. He founded the Resava School at Manasija monastery.
- Kir Joakim, late 14th century musical writer.
- Dečani Chronicle, written by an anonymous monk, also from the Resava School made famous by Manasija monastery. Rewritten and published in 1864 by Archimandrite Serafim Ristić of the Dečani Monastery
- Oxford Serbian Psalter, written by an anonymous monk-scribe.
- Munich Serbian Psalter, written by an anonymous monk-scribe.
- Tomić Psalter, named after Simon Tomić, a Serbian art collector, found the 14th century illuminated manuscript in Old Serbia in 1901.
- Đurađ Branković (1377–1456), author psalter Oktoih, published posthumously in 1494 by Hieromonk Makarije, the founder of Serbian and Romanian printing.
- Romylos of Vidin, also known as Romylos of Ravanica where he died in the late 1300s.
- Kir Stefan the Serb (late 14th and early 15th century), Serbian monk-scribe and composer.
- Nikola the Serb (late 14th and early 15th century), Serbian monk-scribe and composer.
- Isaiah the Serb, monk-scribe and composer of chants in the 15th century. He finished the translation from Greek to Serbian of the Corpus Areopagiticum, the works of Pseudo-Dionysius the Areopagite, in 1371, and transcribed the manuscripts of Joachim, Domestikos of Serbia.
- Danilo III (patriarch), writer and poet.
- Constantine of Kostenets (fl. 1380–1431), Bulgarian writer and chronicler who lived in Serbia, author of the biography of Despot Stefan Lazarević and of the first Serbian philological study, Skazanije o pismenah (A History on the Letters).
- Kantakuzina Katarina Branković (1418/19–1492), remembered for commissioning the Varaždin Apostol in 1454.
- Radoslav Gospels, work of both Celibate Priest Feodor, also known as "Inok from Dalsa" (fl. 1428–1429), who is credited for transcribing the Radoslav Gospel (Tetraevangelion) in the Serbian recension, now in the National Library of Russia in St. Petersburg. Radoslav is the famed miniaturist who illuminated the pages.
- Jelena Balšić's correspondence with monk Nikon of Jerusalem between 1441 and 1442 is found in Gorički zbornik, named after the island of Gorica in Lake Skadar where Jelena built a church.
- Dimitrije Kantakuzin, while residing in the Rila monastery in 1469 Kantakuzin wrote a biography of Saint John of Rila and a touching "Prayer to the Holy Virgin" imploring her aid in combating sin.
- Konstantin Mihailović (c. 1430–1501), the last years of his life were spent in Poland where he wrote his Turkish Chronicle, an interesting document with a detailed description of the historical events of that period as well as various customs of the Turks and Christians.
- Pachomius the Serb (Paxomij Logofet), prolific hagiographer who came from Mount Athos to work in Russia between 1429 and 1484. He wrote eleven saint's lives (zhitie) while employed by the Russian Orthodox Church in Novgorod. He was one of the representatives of the ornamental style known as pletenje slova (word-braiding).
- Dimitar of Kratovo, 15th-century Serb writer and lexicographer of the Kratovo Literary School.
- Ninac Vukoslavić (fl. 1450–1459), chancellor and scribe at the court of Scanderbeg, and author of his letters.
- Deacon Damian who wrote "Koporin Chronicle" in 1453.
- Vladislav the Grammarian (fl. 1456–1483), Serbian monk, writer, historian and theologian.
- Đurađ Crnojević (fl. 1490–1496), first printed the Oktoih at Cetinje in 1495.
- Božidar Vuković (ca. 1465–1540), one of the writers and early printers of Serb books.
- Andrija Paltašić, early printer and publisher of Serb books.
- Dimitar of Kratovo, 15th-century Serb writer and lexicographer, one of the most important members of the Kratovo literary school.
- Martin Segon, Serbian writer, Catholic Bishop of Ulcinj and a 15th-century humanist.
- Lazar of Hilandar After Pachomius the Serb, the most significant Serbian monk in Imperial Russia.
- Hieromonk Makarije (1465–c. 1530) is the founder of Serbian and Romanian printing, having printed the first book in the Serbian language in Obod (Crnagora) in 1493, and the first book in Wallachia. He also wrote extensively.

==== Baroque ====
- Hieromonk Pahomije (c. 1480–1544) learned the skills of the printing trade from Hieromonk Makarije at the Crnojević printing house.
- Paskoje Primojević (fl. 1482–1527) was a poet and Serbian scribe in the Serbian Chancellery in Dubrovnik during the time of the Republic of Ragusa.
- Božidar Goraždanin founded the Goražde printing house in the 1520s.
- Benedikt Kuripečič (1491–1531) was the first to record part of the folk songs of the Battle of Kosovo dealing with Miloš Obilić's exploits.
- Stefan Paštrović (fl. 1560–1599), author of two books, engaged a certain hieromonk Sava of Visoki Dečani to print them in Venice at the Francesco Rampazetto and Heirs publishing house in 1597.
- Hegumen Mardarije (fl. 1543–45) was a Serbian Orthodox abbott and one of the first printers.
- Hieromonk Mardarije (fl. 1550–1568) used to print his books at Mrkšina crkva printing house before the Ottomans destroyed it.
- Bonino De Boninis, early printer and publisher in Dubrovnik.
- Trojan Gundulić is remembered for printing the first book in Belgrade in 1552, "The Four Gospels".
- Vićenco Vuković was one of the major printers of 16th century Serbia, like his father before him.
- Jerolim Zagurović was a Catholic-Serb printer from Kotor.
- Stefan Marinović was a Serb printer from Scutari during the time of Vićenco Vuković, Jerolim Zagurović, Jakov of Kamena Reka and others. The longest-lived printing in the Balkans was done at Scutari, where Stefan Skadranin worked between 1563 and 1580. When his press stopped, because of continued Turkish authority over the region, Serbian printing left the Balkans. Later, Serbian books were printed in Venice, Leipzig, Vienna, and Trieste.
- Jakov of Kamena Reka worked in the Vuković printing house in Venice with Vićenco Vuković, son of Božidar.
- Radiša Dimitrović owned the Belgrade printing house where many medieval works were published.
- Mojsije Dečanac (fl. 1536–40) is remembered for printing Praznićni minej (Holiday Menaion) of Božidar Vuković in Venice in 1538.
- Hieromonk Genadije was another printer who worked alongside hieromonk Teodosije at Mileševa monastery and later in Venice with hierodeacon Mojsije and hieromonk Teodosije.
- Dimitrije Karaman, born in Lipova, Arad in the early 1500s, was an early Serbian poet and bard.
- Peja (priest) wrote a poem In the Court and in the Dungeon, from The Service of Saint George of Kratovo, and a biography of the same saint between 1515 and 1523.
- Teodor Ljubavić wrote the Goražde Psalter in 1521.
- Tronoša Chronicle was written in 1526 and transcribed by hieromonk Josif Tronoša in the eighteenth century.
- Jovan Maleševac was a Serbian Orthodox monk and scribe who collaborated in 1561 with the Slovene Protestant reformer Primož Trubar to print religious books in Cyrillic.
- Matija Popović was a 16th-century Serbian Orthodox cleric from Ottoman Bosnia who also supported the Reformation movement.
- Peter Petrovics was a 16th-century Serbian magnate and one of Hungary's most influential and fervent supporters of the Reformation.
- Luka Radovanović was a 15th-century Serb Catholic priest from Ragusa who owned a small printing press, one of the earliest at the time.
- Luka Primojević is another early printer of the 16th century from Ragusa to use Church Slavonic, Cyrillic type.
- Dimitrije Ljubavić (1519–1563) was a Serbian Orthodox deacon, humanist, writer, and printer who sought to bring a rapprochement between the Lutherans and the Eastern Orthodox Church.
- Pajsije I Janjevac (1542–1649) was a Serbian Patriarch and an author whose works showed an admixture of popular elements.
- Jovan the Serb of Kratovo (1526–1583) was a Serbian writer and monk whose name is preserved as the author of six books, now part of the Museum Collection of the Serbian Orthodox Church.
- Teodor Račanin (Bajina Bašta, c. 1500–Bajina Bašta, past-1560) was the first Serbian writer and monk of the Rachan Scriptorium School mentioned in Ottoman and Serbian sources.
- Inok Sava (c. 1530–after 1597) was the first to write and publish a Serbian Primer (syllabary) at the printing press of Giovanni Antonio Rampazetto in Venice in two editions, first on 20 May and the second on 25 May 1597, after which the book somehow fell into neglect only to be rediscovered recently.
- Georgije Mitrofanović (c.1550–1630) was a Serbian Orthodox monk and painter whose work can be seen in the church at the Morača monastery.
- Vićenco Vuković was one of the major printers of 16th century Serbia, like his father before him.
- Mavro Orbin (1563–1614) was the author of the "Realm of the Slavs" (1601) which made a significant impact on Serbian historiography, influencing future historians, particularly Đorđe Branković (count).
- Zograf Longin was an icon painter and writer.
- Jerolim Zagurović was a Catholic-Serb printer from Kotor.
- Stefan Marinović was a Serb printer from Scutari during the time of Vićenco Vuković, Jerolim Zagurović, Jakov of Kamena Reka and others.
- Jakov of Kamena Reka worked in the Vuković printing house in Venice with Vićenco Vuković.
- Mariano Bolizza (fl. 1614) was a prominent Serbian writer who also wrote in Italian.
- Gavril Stefanović Venclović (fl. Bajina Bašta, 1670–Szentendre, 1749), one of the first and most notable representatives of Serbian Baroque and Enlightenment literature, wrote in the vernacular. Milorad Pavić saw Venclović as a living link between the Byzantine literary tradition and the emerging new views on modern literature. He was the precursor of enlightenment aiming, most of all, to educate the common folk.
- Zaharije Orfelin (1726–1785), one of the most notable representatives of the Serbian Baroque in art and literature

==== Enlightenment ====
- John of Tobolsk (1651–1715) was a Serbian cleric born in Nizhyn, in the Czernihow Voivodeship of the Polish–Lithuanian Commonwealth of the time, now revered as a saint.
- Radul of Riđani (fl. 1650–1666) was a Serbian Orthodox priest and chieftain of Riđani, and a prolific letter writer who kept the authorities of Perast informed about Ottoman preparations for the Battle of Perast. A collection of his letters are kept in a museum.
- Kiprijan Račanin (c. 1650–1730) was a Serbian writer and monk who founded a copyist school in Szentendre in Hungary, like the one he left behind at the Rača monastery in Serbia at the beginning of the Great Turkish War in 1689.
- Jerotej Račanin (c. 1650–after 1727) was a Serbian writer and copyist of church manuscripts and books. After visiting Jerusalem in 1704 he wrote a book about his travel experiences from Hungary to the Holy Land and back.
- Čirjak Račanin (Bajina Bašta, c. 1660–Szentendre, 1731) was a Serbian writer and monk, a member of the famed "School of Rača".
- Đorđe Branković, Count of Podgorica (1645–1711) who wrote the first history of Serbia in five volumes.
- Tripo Kokolja (1661–1713) was a well-known Serbian-Venetian painter.
- Sava Vladislavich (1669–1738), framed Peter the Great's proclamation of 1711, translated Mavro Orbin's Il regno de gli Slavi (1601); The Realm of the Slavs) from Italian into Russian, and composed the Treaty of Kiakhta and many others
- Julije Balović (1672–1727) wrote in Italian and Serbian. He is the author of Practichae Schrivaneschae, a manual for a ship's scribe, and Perast Chronicles, a collection of epic poetry.
- Ivan Krušala (1675–1735) is best known for writing a poem about the Battle of Perast in 1654, among others. He worked in a Russian embassy in China at the time when Sava Vladislavich was the ambassador.
- Hristofor Žefarović was a 17th- and 18th- century Serbian poet who died in Imperial Russia spreading the Pan-Slav culture.
- Simeon Končarević (c. 1690–1769), a Serbian writer and Bishop of Dalmatia who, exiled twice from his homeland, settled in Russia where he wrote his chronicles.
- Parteniy Pavlovich (c. 1695–1760) was a Serbian Orthodox Church cleric who championed South Slavic revival.
- Danilo I, Metropolitan of Cetinje (1697–1735) was a writer and founder of the Petrović Njegoš dynasty.
- Sava Petrović (1702–1782) wrote numerous letters to the Moscow metropolitan and the Empress Elizabeth of Russia about the deploring conditions of the Serb Nation under occupation by the Turks, Republic of Venice and the Habsburg Empire.
- Pavle Nenadović (1703–1768) was commissioned by Serbian Orthodox Metropolitan of Karlovci, Arsenije IV Jovanović Šakabenta to compose a heraldic book, Stemmatographia.
- Vasilije III Petrović-Njegoš (1709–1766), Serbian Orthodox Metropolitan of Montenegro, wrote patriotic poetry and the first history of Montenegro, published in Moscow in 1754
- Pavle Julinac (1730–1785) was a Serbian writer, historian, traveler, soldier, and diplomat
- Jovan Rajić (1726–1801), writer, historian, traveler, and pedagogue, who wrote the first systematic work on the history of Croats and Serbs
- Mojsije Putnik (1728–1790), Metropolitan, educator, writer, and founder of secondary schools and institutions of higher learning.
- Nikola Nešković (1740–1789) was a most prolific Serbian icon, fresco and portrait painter in the Baroque style.
- Teodor Ilić Češljar (1746–1793) was one of the best late Baroque Serbian painters from the region of Vojvodina.
- Pavel Đurković (1772–1830) was one of the most important Serbian Baroque artists (writers, icon painters, goldsmiths, woodcarvers) along with Jakov Orfelin (1750–1803), Stefan Gavrilović, Georgije Bakalović, and others.
- Jovan Četirević Grabovan (1720–1781) was a Serbian icon painter. He painted the Lepavina and Orahovica monasteries, among others.
- Kiril Zhivkovich (1730–1807) was a Serbian and Bulgarian writer.
- Petar I Petrović Njegoš (1748–1830) was a writer and poet besides being a spiritual and temporal ruler of the "Serb land of Montenegro" as he called it.
- Sofronije Jugović-Marković (fl. 1789) was a Serbian writer and activist in Russian service. He wrote "Serbian Empire and State" in 1792 in order to raise the patriotic spirit of the Serbs in both the Habsburg and Ottoman empires.
- Tomo Medin (1725–1788) was a Montenegrin Serb writer and adventurer. He and Casanova had two duels together.
- Stefano Zannowich (1751–1786) was a Montenegrin Serb writer and adventurer. From his early youth, he was prone to challenges and adventures, unruly and dissipated life. He wrote in Italian and French, besides Serbian. He is known for his "Turkish Letters" that fascinated his contemporaries. His works belong to the genre of epistolary novel.
- Tripo Smeća (1755–1812) was a Venetian historian and writer who wrote in Italian and in Serbian.
- Hadži-Ruvim (1752–1804) was a Serbian Orthodox archimandrite who documented events and wars in his time, established a private library, wrote library bibliographies, collected books in which he drew ornaments and miniatures. He did wood carving and woodcutting.

==== Rationalism ====
- Simeon Piščević (1731–1797), was a Serbian writer and high-ranking officer in the service of both Austria and Imperial Russia.
- Dositej Obradović (1739–1811), the influential protagonist of the Serbian national and cultural renaissance, founder of modern Serbian literature
- Teodor Janković-Mirijevski (1740–1814), the most influential educational reformer in the Habsburg Empire and Imperial Russia
- Avram Miletić (1755–after 1826) was a merchant and writer of epic folk songs.
- Avram Mrazović (1756–1826) was a Serbian writer, translator, and pedagogue.
- Jovan Muškatirović (1743–1809) was one of the early disciples of Dositej Obradović.
- Aleksije Vezilić (1753–1792) was a Serbian lyric poet who introduced the Teutonic vision of the Enlightenment to the Serbs.
- Emanuilo Janković (1758–1792) was a Serbian man of letters and of science.
- Stefan von Novaković (1740–1826) was a Serbian writer, publisher, and patron of Serbian literature.
- Pavle Solarić (1779–1821) was Obradović's disciple who wrote poetry and the first book on geography in the vernacular.
- Gerasim Zelić (1752–1828), Serbian Orthodox Church archimandrite, traveler and writer (compatriot of Dositej). His chief work was the travel memoirs Žitije (Lives), which also served as a sociological work.
- Sava Tekelija (1761–1842) was the patron of Matica Srpska, a literary and cultural society
- Gligorije Trlajić (1766–1811), writer, poet, polyglot and professor of law at the universities of St. Petersburg and Kharkiv (Harkov), author of a textbook on Civil Law which according to some laid the foundations of Russian civil law doctrine
- Atanasije Stojković (1773–1832) was a Serbian writer, pedagogue, physicist, mathematician and astronomer in the service of Imperial Russia. He also taught mathematics at the university of Kharkiv.
- Vićentije Rakić (1750–1818) was a Serbian writer and poet. He founded the School of Theology (now part of the University of Belgrade) when in 1810 he headed a newly established theological college and in 1812 the first students graduated from it. He was a disciple of Dositej Obradović.
- Jovan Pačić (1771–1848) was a Serbian poet, writer, translator, painter, and soldier. He translated Goethe
- Teodor Filipović (1778–1807), writer, jurist, and educator, wrote the Decree of the Governing Council of Revolutionary Serbia. He taught at the newly founded National University of Kharkiv, with his compatriots, Gligorije Trlajić and Atanasije Stojković.
- Jovan Došenović (1781–1813) was a Serbian philosopher, poet, and translator.
- Jovan Avakumović (1748–1810), known as a representative of the Serbian folk poetry of the 18th century, though he only wrote a few poems which were part of handwritten poem books

==== Rationalism to Romanticism ====
- Lukijan Mušicki (1777–1837), Serbian Orthodox Abbott, poet, prose writer, and polyglot.
- Georgije Magarašević (1793–1830), eminent writer, historian, dramatist, publisher, and founder and first editor of Serbski Letopis.
- Joakim Vujić (1772–1847), writer, dramatist, actor, traveller and polyglot. He is known as the Father of Serbian Theatre.
- Matija Nenadović (1777–1854) author of Memoirs, an eyewitness account of the First Serbian Uprising in 1804 and the Second Serbian Uprising in 1815.
- Stevan Živković-Telemak (1780–1831) is the author of Obnovljene Srbije, 1780–1831 (Serbie nouvelle, 1780–1731) [1] and Serbian translator of François Fénelon's Les Aventures de Télémaque.
- Dimitrije Davidović (1789–1838), Minister of Education of the Principality of Serbia, writer, journalist, publisher, historian, diplomatist, and founder of modern Serbian journalism and publishing.
- Luka Milovanov Georgijević (1784–1828) is considered the first children's poet of new Serbian literature. He collaborated with Vuk Karadžić on the production of grammars and the dictionary.
- Stefan Stefanović (1807–1828) is a Serbian writer who lived and worked in Novi Sad and Budapest
- Tomo Milinović (1770–1846) is a Serbian writer and freedom-fighter. He authored two books, Umotvorina (published posthumously 1847) and Istorija Slavenskog Primorija (lost and never published).
- Dimitrije Vladisavljević (1788–1858) is a Serbian grammarian, translator and writer.
- Jovan Hadžić (1799–1869) was a Serbian writer and legislator
- Jovan Stejić (1803–1853) was a Serbian physician writer, philosopher, translator, and a critic of Vuk Karadžić's language reform.
- Jovan Sterija Popović (1806–1856), playwright, poet and pedagogue who taught at the Velika škola in Belgrade.
- Nikanor Grujić (1810–1887), Rationalism to Romanticism
- Jovan Đorđević (1826–1900), Serbian man of letters, writer of lyrics to the Serbian National anthem
- Vasa Živković, Rationalism to Romanticism
- Svetozar Miletić, writer and editor of a magazine called Slavjanka, in which Serbian students living under Habsburg occupation championed their ideas of national freedom
- Ljubomir Nenadović, writer
- Milica Stojadinović-Srpkinja (1828–1878), poet

==== Romanticism ====
- Petar II Petrović-Njegoš, Romanticism
- Vuk Stefanović Karadžić, Romanticism
- Avram Miletić was merchant and writer of epic songs who wrote the earliest collection of urban lyric poetry.
- Old Rashko, Romanticism
- Živana Antonijević, Romanticism
- Tešan Podrugović, Romanticism
- Filip Višnjić, Romanticism
- Sava Mrkalj, Romanticism
- Đuro Daničić, collaborated with Vuk Karadžić in reforming and standardizing the Serbian language, and translating the Bible from old Serbo-Slavonic into modern-day Serbian
- Vuk Vrčević, collaborated with Vuk Karadžić collecting Serbian tales and songs in Montenegro, Bosnia and Herzegovina and Dalmatia along with Vuk Popović
- Ivan Stojanović, Romanticism
- Branko Radičević, Romanticism
- Jovan Sundečić, Romanticism
- Jovan Jovanović Zmaj, Romanticism
- Đura Jakšić, Romanticism
- Novak Radonić (1826–1890), Romanticism
- Đorđe Marković Koder, Romanticism
- Milica Stojadinović Srpkinja, Romanticism
- Staka Skenderova, Romanticism, a Bosnian Serb writer, teacher and social worker.
- Vaso Pelagić, Romanticism
- Laza Kostić, Romanticism
- Stjepan Mitrov Ljubiša, Romanticism
- Pavle Stamatović
- Visarion Ljubiša, Romanticism
- Čedomilj Mijatović, Romanticism
- Kosta Trifković, Romanticism
- Ilarion Ruvarac, Romanticism
- Mato Vodopić (1816–1893) was a Serb-Catholic Bishop of Dubrovnik and poet, Romanticism
- Marko Miljanov, Romanticism
- Pavle Stamatović, Romanticism
- Nikša Gradi, Romanticism
- Pero Budmani, Romanticism
- Ivan Stojanović, Romanticism
- Mirko Petrović-Njegoš, Romanticism

==== Realism ====
- Jakov Ignjatović, Realism
- Dimitrije Ruvarac, Realism
- Kosta Ruvarac, Realism
- Milovan Glišić, Realism
- Stojan Novaković
- Jaša Tomić, Realism
- Gavrilo Vitković, Realism
- Ljubomir Nenadović, Realism
- Milan Đ. Milićević, Realism
- Laza Lazarević, Realism
- Stefan Stefanović
- Janko Veselinović (writer), Realism
- Simo Matavulj, Realism
- Pavle Stamatović
- Dimitrije Matić
- Dragomir Brzak
- Božidar Petranović, Realism
- Svetolik Ranković, Realism
- Stevan Sremac, Realism
- Radoje Domanović, Realism
- Vojislav Ilić, Realism
- Svetozar Marković, Realism
- Vladimir Jovanović, Realism
- Borisav Stanković, Realism
- Ljubomir Nedić, Realism
- Sava Bjelanović, Realism
- Marko Car, Realism
- Paja Jovanović, Realism
- Uroš Predić, Realism
- Marko Murat, Realism
- Svetomir Nikolajević, Realism
- Nikola Musulin, Realism
- Vladan Đorđević, Realism
- Nikodim Milaš, Realism
- Risto Kovačić, Realism
- Ivo Vojnović, Realism
- Ivan Ivanić, Realism; a diplomat and an author
- Antun Fabris (1864–1904), Realism
- Milan Rešetar, Realism
- Medo Pucić, Realism
- Niko Pucić, Realism
- Okica Gluščević, Realism
- Milorad Pavlović-Krpa

==== Moderna ====
- Petar Kočić, Realism to Moderna
- Svetozar Ćorović, Realism to Moderna
- Branislav Nušić, Realism to Moderna
- Mileta Jakšić. Realism to Moderna
- Aleksa Šantić, Realism to Moderna
- Veljko Petrović (poet), Moderna
- Sima Pandurović, Moderna
- Jevto Dedijer, Moderna
- Milan Rakić, Moderna
- Vladislav Petković Dis, Moderna
- Jovan Dučić, Moderna
- Isidora Sekulic
- Branko Miljković
- Dimitrije Mitrinović
- Bogdan Popović
- Stijepo Kobasica
- Kosta Abrašević, Moderna
- Prince Bojidar Karageorgevitch
- Jela Spiridonović-Savić
- Veljko Petrović
- Dušan Vasiljev
- Momčilo Nastasijević, poet
- Vojislav Jovanović Marambo
- Prince Bojidar Karageorgevitch
- Jovan Popović

==== Avant-Garde ====
- Momčilo Nastasijević
- Vojislav Jovanović Marambo, naturalism, kitchen sink drama
- Jelena Dimitrijević
- Miloš Crnjanski for a time led a movement called Sumatraism.
- Stanislav Vinaver (1891–1965)
- Vladimir Velmar-Janković (1895–1976)
- Oskar Davičo (1909–1989), Surrealist
- Desanka Maksimović (1898–1993)
- Dušan Vasiljev (1900–1924)
- Vladan Desnica (1905–1967)
- Meša Selimović
- Dušan Matić
- Milena Pavlović-Barili
- Vasko Popa

==== Contemporary ====
- B. Wongar Serbian-Australian novelist, short story writer, poet, anthropologist, humanist, and campaigner for the rights of Australian Aborigines
- Nenad Prokić
- Ivan V. Lalić
- Miodrag Pavlović
- Branko Ćopić
- Charles Simic
- Milo Dor
- Milovan Danojlić
- Vojin Jelić
- Stojan Cerović (1949–2005) writer for the magazine Vreme
- Slobodan Savić
- Danilo Kiš
- Dejan Stojanović
- Matija Bećković
- Dobrica Ćosić
- Milorad Pavić
- Borislav Pekić
- Aleksandar Novaković
- John Simon (critic), Serbian-American author and theatre critic living and working in New York City.
- Svetlana Velmar-Janković
- Biljana Srbljanović
- Jasmina Tešanović
- Prvoslav Vujčić
- Mateja Matejić (priest)
- Živojin Pavlović
- Vidosav Stevanović
- Sava Babić
- Ljubivoje Ršumović
- Milan Milišić
- Špiro Kulišić
- Mirko Kovač (writer)
- Vladimir Voinovich
- Zoran Spasojević
- Vida Ognjenović
- Dragomir Dujmov
- Mihailo Lalić
- Aleksandar Tišma
- Rade Jovanović
- Dragomir Brajković
- Vladimir Voinovich
- Miodrag Bulatović
- Novica Tadić
- Raša Papeš
- Nenad Petrović
- Evgenije Popović
- Zoran Živković
- Jovan Ćirilov
- Svetislav Basara
- Duško Trifunović
- Duško Radović
- Draginja Adamović
- Ljubomir Simović
- Vladan Matijević
- Dragoslav Mihailović
- Grozdana Olujić
- Dobrica Erić
- Filip David
- Dragan Lukić
- Dragomir Brajković
- Mika Antić
- Siniša Kovačević
- David Albahari
- Aleksandar Gatalica
- Radoslav Pavlović
- Dušan Kovačević
- Vladislav Bajac
- Goran Petrović
- Bogdan Bogdanović, essayist.
- Radovan Zogović (1907–1986), leading Serb poet and literary critic from Montenegro.
- Milovan Vitezović
- Jelena Dimitrijević
- Mir-Jam
- Radomir Belaćević
- Ovidiu Pecican, Romanian writer of Serbian origin.
- Vesna Goldsworthy, writer who now lives and works in England.
- Radosav Stojanović (born 1950)
- Olivia Sudjic, British fiction writer
- Aleksandra Čvorović (born 1972), Serbian writer from Banja Luka
- Jovan Zivlak
- Miroljub Todorović (1940)
- Slaven Radovanović (1947)
- Slobodan Škerović (1954)
- Ilija Bakić (1960)
- Zoran Stefanović (1969)
- Branislava Ilić (1970)
- Jelena Ćirić (born 1973), Serbian writer from Prague
- Biljana Jovanović
- Uroš Petrović
- Srđan Srdić

=== Performing artists ===
==== Actors ====
- Nevenka Urbanova (1909–2007), actress
- Beba Lončar, Serbian-Italian film actress
- Sloboda Mićalović
- Dragan Mićanović
- Miki Manojlović (born 1950), Yugoslav and Serbian actor, star of some of the most important films in Yugoslav cinema, president of the Serbian Film Center since 2009
- Marija Karan (born 1982)
- Danica Curcic Danish actress, Serbian parentage
- Dragomir Gidra Bojanić
- Anica Dobra (born 1963), Serbian actress, who won Bavarian Film Awards "Best Young Actress" for Rosamunde, cast in German Love Scenes from Planet Earth
- Mel Novak
- Ben Mulroney
- Branka Katić, Serbian actress
- Branko Tomović
- Danilo Stojković
- Predrag Bjelac
- Dragan Bjelogrlić (born 1963), Serbian actor
- Miloš Biković
- Dragan Nikolić
- Gala Videnović
- Gojko Mitić
- Iván Petrovich (1894–1962) German actor of Serbian origin, silent screen star
- Ivan Rassimov brother of actress Rada Rassimov (born Djerasimović)
- Lazar Ristovski, actor and director
- Ljuba Tadić
- Ljubiša Samardžić
- Nenad Jezdić
- Đoko Rosić
- Mija Aleksić
- Milena Dravić
- Radmila Savićević
- Ružica Sokić
- Svetlana Bojković
- Rahela Ferari
- Radmila Živković
- Eva Ras
- Renata Ulmanski
- Vesna Čipčić
- Gorica Popović
- Ljiljana Blagojević
- Jelica Sretenović
- Anita Mančić
- Nataša Ninković
- Katarina Žutić
- Zlata Petković
- Branka Katić
- Vera Čukić
- Dubravka Mijatović
- Olivera Katarina
- Olga Odanović
- Neda Arnerić
- Miodrag Petrović Čkalja
- Mira Banjac
- Mira Stupica
- Nataša Šolak
- Nikola Đuričko
- Nikola Kojo
- Pavle Vujisić
- Petar Božović
- Predrag Miletić
- Miloš Samolov
- Gordan Kičić
- Seka Sablić, actress
- Slobodan Aligrudić
- Sonja Kolačarić, Serbian actress
- Stevan Šalajić (1929–2002)
- Sonja Savić, Serbian actress
- Srđan Žika Todorović
- Stevo Žigon
- Velimir Bata Živojinović
- Vesna Trivalić
- Vojin Ćetković
- Vojislav Brajović
- Zoran Bečić
- Zoran Cvijanović
- Zoran Radmilović
- Radoš Bajić
- Branimir Brstina
- Žarko Laušević
- Jovan Janićijević Burduš
- Slavko Štimac
- Milan Gutović
- Nikola Simić
- Branko Pleša
- Vlastimir Đuza Stojiljković
- Bekim Fehmiu
- Rade Marković
- Mihajlo Bata Paskaljević
- Josif Tatić
- Živojin Milenković
- Marko Nikolić
- Milorad Mandić
- Milenko Zablaćanski
- Predrag Ejdus
- Branko Cvejić
- Aljoša Vučković
- Dejan Čukić
- Bora Todorović
- Mirjana Karanović
- Aleksandar Berček
- Branislav Lečić
- Slavko Labović
- Pavle Vujisić
- Taško Načić, Yugoslav actor
- Jelena Tinska, actress and ballerina
- Vesna Trivalić, actress
- Olivera Vuco, actress
- Olivera Marković, actress
- Petar Benčina, actor
- Mihailo Markovic, stage actor of the early 20th century, renowned for his performances in Nikolai Gogol's "Inspector"
- Nina Senicar, American film actress
- Aleksandar Gligoric, actor
- Jelisaveta Orašanin, actress
- Dragana Atlija, model and actress
- Dijana Dejanovic, model and Bollywood actress
- Tamara Dragičević, model and actress
- Bojana Ordinačev, actress
- Zlata Petković, actress
- Mirka Vasiljević, actress
- Danica Curcic
- Branko Tomović

==== Film/TV directors and screenwriters ====
- Predrag Bambić (born 1958), film and television cinematographer and producer
- Dušan Makavejev, film director and screenwriter.
- Aleksandar Petrović, Yugoslavian film director
- Dušan Kovačević, director and writer
- Srdan Golubović, director
- Stefan Arsenijević, director, Golden Bear winner at the Berlin International Film Festival
- Želimir Žilnik, director, Golden Bear winner at the Berlin International Film Festival
- Gojko Mitić, director
- Goran Gajić, director
- Goran Paskaljević, director
- Slavko Vorkapić, director and editor
- Slobodan Šijan, director
- Boro Drašković, director
- Srđan Dragojević, director
- Boris Malagurski, documentary filmmaker

==== Models ====
- Aleksandra Melnichenko (born 1977), Serbian model and pop group member, wife of Andrey Melnichenko
- Nataša Vojnović (born 1979), Serbian fashion model
- Maja Latinović (born 1980), Serbian fashion model
- Sanja Papić (born 1984), Miss Serbia and Montenegro at the Miss Universe 2002
- Danijela Dimitrovska (born 1987), Serbian fashion model
- Georgina Stojiljković (born 1988), Serbian fashion model
- Sara Brajovic, French fashion model
- Aleksandra Nikolić (born 1990), Serbian fashion model
- Olya Ivanisevic, Serbian fashion model
- Mila Miletic, Serbian fashion model
- Sofija Milošević, Serbian fashion model
- Sara Mitić, model and beauty pageant winner
- Vedrana Grbović, model and beauty pageant winner
- Sanja Papić, Serbian fashion model and beauty pageant winner
- Anđelka Tomašević (born 1993), model and beauty pageant winner

=== Musicians ===
==== Singers and rappers ====
- Aca Lukas (born 1968), pop-folk musician
- Aleksandra Kovač (born 1972), pop and R&B singer-songwriter, member of K2
- Aleksandra Radović (born 1974), pop and R&B singer
- Ana Rich (born 1983), pop and pop-folk singer
- Bebi Dol (born 1962), pop, rock and jazz singer-songwriter
- Bora Đorđević (born 1953), rock musician, member of Riblja Čorba
- Ceca (born 1973), pop-folk singer
- Dalibor Andonov Gru (1973–2019), rapper
- Leontina Vukomanović (1974), pop singer-songwriter
- Dragana Mirković (born 1968), pop-folk singer
- Đorđe Balašević (1953–2021), pop-rock musician
- Goca Tržan (born 1974), Europop singer, member of Tap 011
- Emina Jahović (born 1982), pop singer-songwriter
- Jelena Karleuša (born 1978), pop singer
- Kristina Kovač (born 1974), pop and R&B singer-songwriter, member of K2
- Lepa Lukić (born 1940), folk singer
- Lola Novaković (1935–2016), pop singer
- Milan Stanković (born 1987), pop singer
- Miroslav Ilić (born 1950), folk singer
- Momčilo Bajagić "Bajaga" (born 1960), rock musician, member of Bajaga i Instruktori
- Nada Mamula (1927–2001), traditional folk singer
- Nataša Bekvalac (born 1980), pop singer
- Nele Karajlić (born 1962), rock musician, member of Zabranjeno Pušenje
- Sara Jo (born 1993), pop and R&B singer
- Saša Matić (born 1978), pop-folk musician
- Slađana Milošević (born 1955), rock musician
- Stefan Đurić Rasta (born 1989), rapper
- Svetlana Spajić (born 1971), world music singer-songwriter
- Šaban Šaulić (1951–2019), folk singer-songwriter
- Vlado Georgiev (born 1976), pop-rock musician
- Vesna Zmijanac (born 1957), pop-folk singer
- Zorica Brunclik (born 1955), folk singer
- Zvonko Bogdan (born 1942), traditional folk singer
- Željko Joksimović (born 1972), pop singer, 2nd place at Eurovision 2004, and 3rd place at Eurovision 2012

==== Music performers ====
- Maja Bogdanović, cellist
- Milan
- Uroš Dojčinović (guitarist)
- Raša Đelmaš {rock drummer}
- Denise Djokic (Canadian Cellist)
- Philippe Djokic (professor of violin at Dalhousie U.)
- Bora Đorđević, rock singer
- Duško Gojković (jazz trumpetist and composer)
- Kornelije Kovač (rock keyboard player and composer)
- Zoran Lesandrić (rock musician)
- Boban Marković, acclaimed brass ensemble leader (Boban Marković Orchestra), won "Best Orchestra" at 40th Guča Sabor (2000). Soundtrack for Kusturica movies.
- Stefan Milenković (violin player)
- Milan Mladenović (singer, guitar player)
- Ana Popović (blues guitarist)
- Jasna Popovic (pianist)
- Laza Ristovski (rock/jazz keyboard player)
- Milenko Stefanović, classical and jazz clarinettist
- Radomir Mihailović Točak (rock, jazz, blues guitarist)
- Miroslav Tadić (classical guitarist)
- Bojan Zulfikarpašić, pianist
- Filip Višnjić, guslar
- Petar Perunović-Perun, Montenegrin Serb, naturalized U.S., guslar
- Vlastimir Pavlović Carevac (1895–1965), Serbian violinist, conductor and founder and director of the National Orchestra of Radio Belgrade
- Ivy Jenkins (Ivana Vujic), Metal bass player, fashion designer
- Mike Dimkich, Punk guitarist (The Cult & Bad Religion)
- Jelena Mihailović, cellist
- Marina Arsenijevic, concert pianist and composer
- Nemanja Radulović, violinist

==== Composers ====
- Kir Joakim (14th and early 15th century)
- Kir Stefan the Serb (14th and early 15th century)
- Nikola the Serb (14th and early 15th century)
- Isaiah the Serb (14th and early 15th century)
- Pajsije (1542–1647), the Serbian Patriarch from 1614 to 1647, also composed chants for the liturgy.
- Josif Marinković, one of the most important Serbian composers of the 19th century.
- Isidor Bajić
- Stanislav Binički
- Dejan Despić
- Marko Kon
- Zoran Erić
- Dragutin Gostuški
- Stevan Hristić
- Petar Konjović (1883–1970)
- Petar Krstić
- Ljubica Marić
- Miloje Milojević
- Milan Mihajlović
- Stevan Stojanović Mokranjac
- Vasilije Mokranjac
- Vojna Nešić
- Aleksandar Kobac
- Mihailo Vukdragović
- Miloš Raičković
- Kristina Kovač
- Kornelije Stanković
- Rudolph Reti
- Vladimir Graić
- Petar Stojanović
- Marko Tajčević
- Vladimir Tošić
- Jasna Veličković
- Josip Runjanin, Croatian and Serbian composer, ethnic Serb.
- Zoran Sztevanovity
- Dusan Trbojevic
- Uroš Dojčinović
- Zoran Simjanović
- Isidora Žebeljan
- Slavka Atanasijević was a Serbian composer and pianist.
- Ana Sokolovic, Serbian born Canadian music composer
- Aleksandra Vrebalov, Serbian born American composer and musician

==== Opera singers ====
- Biserka Cvejić (born 1923), Serbian famous opera singer and university professor, mezzo-soprano
- Radmila Bakočević (born 1933), spinto soprano
- Oliver Njego (born 1959), baritone, student of Bakočević, who also crossed over into popular music, eventually becoming a prominent opera singer.
- Nikola Mijailović (born 1973), baritone
- David Bižić (born 1975), baritone
- Laura Pavlović, lyric and spinto soprano opera singer, and a soloist with the Serbian National Theatre Opera in Novi Sad.
- Radmila Smiljanić, classical soprano who has had an active international career in operas and concerts since 1965. She is particularly known for her portrayals of heroines from the operas of Giuseppe Verdi and Giacomo Puccini.
- Milena Kitic, Serbian-born American mezzo-soprano

==== Dancers and choreographers ====
- Milorad Mišković (born 1928), ballet dancer and choreographer, honorary president of UNESCO International Dance Council

== Journalists and critics ==
- Maga Magazinović, Serbia's 1st female journalist and women's rights activist
- Dada Vujasinović, columnist
- Miroslav Lazanski, columnist
- Vasilije Stojković, sports journalist
- Milorad Sokolović, sports journalist
- Ljiljana Aranđelović, news paper editor
- Milan Pantić, journalist
- Danilo Gregorić, news paper editor
- Vukša Veličković, British cultural critic of Serbian descent
- Zoran Kesić, TV presenter and talk-show host
- Dubravka Lakić, film critic
- Ranko Munitić, film critic
- Mirjana Bjelogrlić-Nikolov, television journalist
- Ivan Kalauzović Ivanus (born 1986), journalist and publicist; diaspora chronicler
- Jasmina Karanac, television journalist
- Gordana Suša, television journalist and columnist
- Jelena Adzic, Serbian-born Canadian CBC journalist and on-air personality
- Saša Petricic, Canadian award-winning CBC journalist
- Vesna Nešić Nedić, journalist
- Anka Radakovich, American magazine columnist
- Dušan Petričić, illustrator and caricaturist (Toronto Star, New York Times)
- Brankica Stanković, Serbian investigative journalist

== Scientists and scholars ==
=== Natural science ===
- Mileva Marić, mathematician, wife of Albert Einstein
- Miodrag Stojković, genetic scientist
- Milutin Milanković, geophysicist, astronomer
- Gordana Vunjak-Novakovic, biomedical engineer.
- Pavle Vujević, geophysicist
- Siniša Stanković, biologist
- Svetozar Kurepa, mathematician
- Dušan Kanazir, molecular biologist
- Pavle Savić, physicist and chemist, together with Irène Joliot-Curie he was nominated for Nobel Prize in Physics
- Jovan Cvijić, geographer, ethnographer and geologist
- Mina Bizic, environmental microbiologist
- Nikola Hajdin, construction engineer
- Tatomir Anđelić, mathematician
- Dimitrije Nešić, mathematician
- Jovan Čokor, epidemiologist
- Aleksandar Despić, physicist
- Vuk Marinković, physicist
- Rajko Tomović, physicist and inventor
- Slobodan Ćuk, electrical engineer, professor and inventor
- Ljubomir Klerić, mining engineer and mathematician
- Milomir Kovac, veterinary surgeon and professor
- Milan Damnjanović, physicist
- Ilija Đuričić, veterinary physician
- Bogdan Duricic, biochemist
- Miodrag Radulovacki, neuropharmacologist and professor
- Bogdan Maglich, nuclear physicist
- Jovan Rašković, psychiatrist
- Draga Ljočić, Serbia's first female doctor and women's rights activist
- Petar V. Kokotovic, engineering professor and theorist
- Jovan Karamata, mathematician
- Danilo Blanusa, mathematician, of Serb heritage
- Zoran Knežević, astronomer
- Đuro Kurepa, mathematician
- Vladimir Markovic, mathematician
- Petar Đurković, astronomer
- Milan Kurepa, physicist
- Marko V. Jaric, physicist
- Laza Lazarević, physician
- Marko Leko, chemist
- Sima Lozanić, chemist
- Gradimir Milovanović, mathematician
- Dragoslav Mitrinović, mathematician
- Milorad B. Protić, astronomer
- Ljubisav Rakic, neurobiologist
- Stevo Todorčević, mathematician
- Pavle Vujevic, geographer and meteorologist
- Miomir Vukobratovic, mechanical engineer and pioneer in humanoid robots
- Bogdan Gavrilović, mathematician
- Milan Vukcevich, chemist and grandmaster of chess problem composition
- Jovan Žujović (1856–1938), pioneer in geological and paleontological science in Serbia
- Miodrag Petković, mathematician
- Srđan Ognjanović, mathematician
- Vlatko Vedral, physicist, known for his research on the theory of Entanglement and Quantum Information Theory
- Tihomir Novakov, physicist
- Petar Đurković, astronomer
- Mihajlo D. Mesarovic, scientist and Club of Rome member.
- Lazar the Hilandarian (fl. 1404), Serbian Orthodox monk who built the first mechanical clock tower in Russia
- Ognjeslav Kostović Stepanović (1851–1916)
- Voja Antonić (born 1952), inventor, journalist, writer, magazine editor, radio show contributor, also creator of a build-it-yourself home computer Galaksija
- Mihajlo Idvorski Pupin (1854–1935), physicist, professor and inventor of a new telecommunications technology
- Mihailo Petrović Alas (1868–1943), author of the mathematical phenomenology and inventor of the first hydraulic computer capable to solve differential equations
- Pavle Vujević (1881–1966), founder of the science of microclimatology, and one of the first in the science of potamology
- Ljubinka Nikolić, geographer and geologist, future colonist chosen for the Mars One project (representing Serbia)
- Gordana Lazarevich, Serbian born Canadian musicologist and university department head
- Vesna Milosevic-Zdjelar, Serbian born Canadian astrophysicist and science educator
- Jelena Kovacevic, Dean of Engineering at NYU's Tandon School and Carnegie Mellon University
- Jasmina Vujic, nuclear engineering professor at Berkeley, 1st female nuclear engineering department chair in the US
- Gojko Lalic, chemistry professor at the University of Washington
- Zorica Pantic, engineer and president of Wentworth Institute of Technology
- Maja Pantic, A.I. expert and professor
- Petar Gburčik, meteorologist and professor
- Adolf Hempt, biologist and the founder of the Pasteur Institute
- Nikola Tesla, a physicist and inventor
- Mirjana Vukićević-Karabin, astrophysicist

=== Philosophers ===
- Milan Damnjanović (1924–1994), philosopher, full professor at the Faculty of Fine Arts of University of Belgrade
- Ljubomir Tadić
- Branko Pavlović (1928–1996)
- Dositej Obradović (1742–1811), author, philosopher, linguist, polyglot and the first minister of education of Serbia, regarded founder of modern Serbian literature
- Branislav Petronijević, important Serbian philosopher and paleontologist in the first half of the 20th century
- Justin Popović
- Svetozar Stojanović
- Mihailo Đurić
- Davor Džalto
- Veselin Čajkanović
- Nikola Milošević (politician)
- Vojin Rakić
- Ion Petrovici (Rumanian national of Serbian antecedents)
- Đuro Kurepa (1907–1992), best-known logician
- Jevrem Jezdić
- Thomas Nagel (born 1937)
- Svetozar Marković (1846–1875), introduced the doctrine of social reform to Serbia
- Mihailo Marković
- Nikola Milošević
- Vojin Rakić
- Divna M. Vuksanović
- Dimitrije Najdanović
- Dimitrije Matić
- Konstantin "Kosta" Cukić
- Ljubomir Nedić (1858–1902), one of the most quoted philosophers in the late 19th century, a student of Wilhelm Wundt and professor at the University of Belgrade
- Ksenija Atanasijević (1894–1981), the first recognized major female Serbian philosopher, and one of the first female professors of Belgrade University
- Vladimir Jovanović made a name for himself with his "Politički rečnik"(Political Dictionary) as a political theorist

=== Historians and archeologists ===
- Jovan Rajić
- Tibor Živković
- Wayne S. Vucinich
- Bozidar Petranovic, wrote the history of world literature in the 1840s, explaining that national culture had neglected literary history
- Stanoje Stanojević (1873–1937)
- Jovan Radonić (1873–1953)
- Dragutin Anastasijević (1877–1950)
- Milan Kašanin
- Dejan Medaković
- Ilarion Ruvarac
- Panta Srećković
- Dimitrije Ruvarac
- Miroljub Jevtić
- Miloš Milojević, historian who went to the Kosovo and Metohija region in the 1870s and used three books of travel notes to write a demographic-statistical structure of the mutual relations between Serbs and Albanians before the Serbian-Turkish Wars (1876–1878).
- Spiridon Gopčević
- Dušan T. Bataković, historian and diplomat
- Milos Mladenovic
- Sima Ćirković
- Prince Bojidar Karageorgevitch
- Rade Mihaljčić
- Milos Mladenovic
- Vasilije Krestić
- Radivoj Radić
- Latinka Perović
- Milan Đ. Milićević
- Vladimir Dedijer
- Milan St. Protić
- Milorad Ekmečić
- Momčilo Spremić
- Stojan Novaković
- Fanula Papazoglu
- Jevrem Jezdić
- Anna Novakov
- Milan Vasić
- Vaso Čubrilović
- Čedomir Antić
- Predrag Dragić
- Mihailo Gavrilović
- Desanka Kovačević-Kojić
- Slobodan Jovanović
- Jovan Ristić
- Viktor Novak was a Croatian historian who lived, worked and died in Belgrade, Serbia
- Vid Vuletic Vukasović
- Gavrilo Vitković engineer, professor and historian in the 19th century.
- Živko Andrijašević
- George Ostrogorsky (1902–1976), Russian-born Serbian historian and Byzantinist
- Božidar Ferjančić, historian and Byzantine scholar
- Milos Mladenovic was professor emeritus at McGill in Montreal for many years, beginning in the 1950s.
- Traian Stoianovich
- Milorad M. Drachkovitch author of several important books on contemporary political science and history
- Risto Kovačić (1845–1909), historian
- Miodrag Grbic, archaeologist
- Miloje Vasić, archaeologist
- Mihailo Valtrović

=== Economists and sociologysts ===
- Branko Milanović (born 1953), leading economist in the World Bank's research department dealing with poverty and inequality, also a senior associate at the Carnegie Endowment for International Peace in Washington, D.C.
- Radovan Kovačević, Serbian-American professor at the Southern Methodist University Research Center for Advanced Manufacturing, holder of several U.S. patents.
- Milan Stojadinović (1888–1961), Minister of Finance, Prime Minister of Yugoslavia 1935–1939
- Radovan Jelašić (born 1968), Governor of the National Bank of Serbia 2004–2010
- Miroljub Labus, political economist
- Dimitrije Matić
- Konstantin Cukić
- Čedomilj Mijatović
- Čedomir Čupić

=== Editors and publishers ===
- Jovan Jovanović Zmaj, one of the co-founders of Javor (The Maple) at Novi Sad in 1862, was its editor for many years. Zmaj is best known for his poetry.
- Sava Bjelanović was the publisher of Srpski List in Zadar.
- Dejan Ristanović
- Darko F. Ribnikar
- Vladislav F. Ribnikar
- Dimitrije Ruvarac, brother of Ilarion Ruvarac
- Velibor Gligorić, literary critic, editor and writer

=== Linguists and philologists ===
- Dejan Ajdačić
- Rajna Dragićević (born 1968), Serbian linguist, lexicologist and lexicographer.
- Pavle Ivić was a leading South Slavic and general dialectologist and phonologist, and one of the signatories of the 1986 Memorandum of the Serbian Academy of Sciences and Arts.
- Vuk Stefanović Karadžić (1787–1864), philologist and linguist who was the major reformer of the Serbian language. He deserves, perhaps, for his collections of songs, fairy tales, and riddles to be called the father of the study of Serbian folklore. He was also the author of the first Serbian dictionary.
- Branko Mikasinovich (born 1938), Slavist
- Milan Rešetar (1860–1942), linguist, Ragusologist, historian and literary critic from Dubrovnik who was a member of the Serb Catholic movement in Dubrovnik.
- Luko Zore
- Mateja Matejić (priest), Slavist
- Svetomir Nikolajevic, the first professor at the Department of World Literature in Belgrade's School of Philosophy.
- Katarina Milovuk, author of linguistics textbooks, translator, professor and women's rights activist
- Ljiljana Crepajac
- Sava Mrkalj
- Milan Budimir
- Rajko Đurić
- Ivan Klajn

=== Legal experts and lawyers ===
- Teodor Filipović (also known as Bozidar Grujović), lawyer and professor who taught at the university of Harkov
- Sava Tekelija (1761–1842), amongst the first Serbian doctor of law, president of the Matica srpska, philanthropist, noble, and merchant.
- Kosta Čavoški
- Sima Avramović
- Gligorije Trlajić
- Teodor Filipović

== Business entrepreneurs ==
- Drago K. Jovanovich (co-founder of the Helicopter Engineering Research Corporation in Philadelphia with F. Kozloski)
- Milan Mandarić, Serbian-American business tycoon
- Miroslav Mišković President of Delta Holding
- Milan Panić President and chief executive officer, MP Global Enterprises & Associates, USA
- Dejan Ristanović, founder and owner of Sezam Pro and PC PRESS
- Dragan Šolak (businessman), founder of United Group
- Philip Zepter (born Milan Janković), owner of Zepter International
- Ljubomir Vracarevic, developed Real Aikido, a new fighting technique in martial arts.
- Vane Ivanović, President of Crestline Shipping Company, London, UK
- Veselin Jevrosimović, CEO and founder of Serbian IT company ComTrade Group
- Miodrag Kostić, CEO and founder of MK Group
- Bogoljub Karić

== Criminals ==
- Vojislav Stanimirović former Journalist Boss of YACS Crime Group that his son Punch Pavle Stanimirović took over in NYC
- Zvezdan Jovanović, former member of the Serbian special police, assassinated Serbian Minister Zoran Đinđić
- Mijailo Mijailović, Swedish psychopath, assassin of Swedish Foreign Minister Anna Lindh
- Arkan, warlord, organized cime
- Kristijan Golubović, organized crime
- Pink Panthers, jewel theft network
- Milorad Ulemek, assassin of Serbian Prime Minister Zoran Đinđić and former Serbian President Ivan Stambolić

== Sportspeople ==
=== Basketball ===
- Aleksandar Nikolić "Aca" (1924–2000), FIBA Hall of Fame, Euroleague Top 10 coaches; WC Coach 78', EC Coach 77', EC Cup 70', 72', 73'
- Radivoj Korać "Žućko" (1938–1969), FIBA Hall of Fame; top 50 in Europe, Euro MVP 61', Eponymous to FIBA Cup
- Dušan Ivković "Duda" (born 1943), Euroleague Top 10 coaches; FIBA Coach 90', EC Coach 89', 91', 95'; EC Player 73'
- Božidar Maljković "Boža" (born 1952), Euroleague Top 10 coaches, EL Coach 89', 90', 93', 96'
- Dragan Kićanović "Kića" (born 1954), FIBA Hall of Fame; Mr. Europa 81', 82'; 76', 80'; WC 78'; EC 73',75',77'
- Željko Obradović (born 1960), 50 Greatest Euroleague Contributors, 96', WC 98', EC 97, Bronze 99', EL Coach 92',94',95',00',02',07',09',11'; Player 88', WC 90'
- Milan Opačić (born 1960)
- Dusan Tadic (born 1988)
- Aleksandar Đorđević (born 1967), Top 50 in Europe, Mr. Europa 94', 95', Euro MVP 97',
- Vlade Divac (born 1968), FIBA Hall of Fame; Top 50 in Europe, Mr. Europa 89'; Kennedy Award 00'; NBA All-Star 01'; Number retired by Sacramento Kings
- Predrag Danilović (born 1970), Top 50 in Europe, Mr. Europa and Italian League MVP 1998; EC 89', 91', 95', 97'
- Dejan Bodiroga (born 1973), Top 10 in 2000s Europe, Top 50 overall; WC 98', 02'; EC 95', 97' and 01'
- Nenad Krstić (born 1983), All-Rookie NBA second team, EC Silver 09' (Active)
- Sasha Pavlović
- Miloš Babić
- Radisav Ćurčić, Serbian-Israeli basketball player, 1999 Israeli Basketball Premier League MVP
- Rastko Cvetković
- Slavko Vraneš
- Duško Vujošević
- Mile Ilić
- Zoran Savić
- Nenad Marković
- Borislav Stanković
- Kosta Perović
- Svetislav Pešić
- Nikola Plećaš
- Nebojša Popović
- Branislav Prelević
- Vladimir Radmanović
- Zoran Radović
- Trajko Rajković
- Igor Rakočević
- Željko Rebrača
- Zoran Savić
- Zoran Slavnić
- Borislav Stanković
- Dan Majerle
- Dragan Tarlać
- Mike Todorovich
- Dejan Tomašević
- Miloš Vujanić
- Ranko Žeravica
- Ratko Varda
- Marko Popović (son of Petar Popović)
- Petar Popović
- Zarko Zecevic
- John Abramovic
- Miroslav Berić
- Žarko Čabarkapa
- Predrag Drobnjak
- Milan Gurović
- Dušan Kecman
- Aleksandar "Aleks" Marić, Australian
- Dejan Milojević
- Darko Miličić Serbian basketball player, NBA champion 2004
- Nikola Peković, Montenegrin, NBA
- Marko Jarić (NBA) EuroBasket 2001, 1st 2002 FIBA World Championship
- Nikola Dragovic
- Aleksandar Petrović
- Bojan Popović
- Velimir Radinović
- Bogdan Bogdanović
- Boban Marjanović
- Nikola Jokić, NBA Most Valuable Player (2021, 2022, 2024), NBA Finals champion and Most Valuable Player (2023)

=== Baseball ===
- Brian Bogusevic, MLB player
- Jess Dobernic, MLB player
- Walt Dropo, MLB player
- Eli Grba, American League Champion with the New York Yankees
- Mike Kekich, MLB player
- Mike Krsnich, MLB player
- Rocky Krsnich, MLB player
- Babe Martin, MLB player
- Doc Medich, MLB player
- Johnny Miljus, MLB player
- Paul Popovich, MLB player
- Dave Rajsich, MLB player
- Gary Rajsich, MLB player
- Jeff Samardzija, player for the Chicago White Sox, also wide receiver at Notre Dame.
- Nick Strincevich, MLB player
- Pete Suder, MLB player
- Steve Sundra, 1939 World Series Champion, pitched with the New York Yankees, Washington Senators, and St. Louis Browns
- Peter Vuckovich, AL Cy Young winner: 1982)
- George Vukovich, MLB player
- John Vukovich, MLB player and coach
- Emil Verban, second baseman for the St. Louis Cardinals, Philadelphia Phillies, Chicago Cubs, and Boston Braves.
- Wally Judnich, MLB player
- Mike Kreevich, MLB player, notable center fielder during the 1930s and 1940s
- Christian Yelich, MLB player
- Mickey Lolich, MLB Player
- Al Niemiec, player for the Boston Red Sox, Philadelphia Athletics, and Seattle Rainiers
- Steve Swetonic, MLB Player
- Ryan Radmanovich, MLB Player and member of Canada Olympic baseball team
- Erik Bakich, college baseball coach
- Joe Tepsic, MLB Player

=== Chess ===
- Boris Kostić
- Svetozar Gligorić
- Borislav Ivkov
- Ivan Ivanišević
- Ljubomir Ljubojević
- Alisa Marić
- Mirjana Marić
- Robert Markuš
- Aleksandar Matanović
- Milan Matulović
- Igor Miladinović
- Petar Trifunović
- Dragoljub Velimirović
- Dragoljub Ciric
- Milunka Lazarević
- Petar Popović
- Predrag Nikolić
- Predrag Ostojić
- Dimitrije Bjelica
- Dragoljub Janošević
- Borislav Milić
- Milan Vukčević
- Milan Vukić
- Branko Damljanović
- Dejan Antić
- Ozren Nedeljković
- Predrag Nikolić
- Dragan Šolak
- Vasilije Tomović
- Mirko Broder
- Boško Abramović
- Bojan Vučković
- Borki Predojević

=== Football ===
- Nemanja Vidić (born 1981), captain for Manchester United, has collection of honours including 3 consecutive Premier League titles (4 titles in total), the UEFA Champions League, the FIFA Club World Cup, three League Cup medals, as well as being included in three consecutive (4 in total including 2010–11 season) PFA Team of the Year sides from 2007 to 2009. In the 2008–09 season, he helped United to a record-breaking run of 14 consecutive clean sheets and was awarded the Barclays Player of the Season. He also collected both the club's Fans' and Players' Player of the Year awards. At the start of the 2010–11 season Vidić was selected as the new team captain of Manchester United. He collected his second Barclays Player of the Season in 2010–11.
- Ivica Dragutinović (born 1975), retired, played for Sevilla FC, won the UEFA Cup: 2005–06, 2006–07; UEFA Super Cup: 2006; Runner-up 2007; Spanish Cup: 2006–07, 2009–10; Spanish Supercup: 2007; Runner-up 2010
- Predrag Đorđević (born 1972), retired, played as a left midfielder for the Greek club Olympiacos for 13 years, becoming Olympiacos' greatest foreign goalscorer, averaging a goal every three league matches, as well as becoming a symbol of Olympiacos' "Golden Age" of 12 championship trophies in 13 years. Đorđević is acknowledged as one of the greatest foreign players to have played in Greece. Đorđević also played for the Serbian football team, amassing 37 caps and 1 goal.
- Branislav Ivanović (born 1984), plays for FC Zenit Saint Petersburg, selected as the right-back of the season for the Premier League 2009–10 season as Chelsea won the league title and the 2010 FA Cup Final.
- Saša Ilić
- George Kakasic
- Vladimir Jugović
- Aleksandar Kolarov (born 1985), perhaps one of the best players to come from Serbia, now playing Manchester City
- Darko Kovačević
- Miloš Krasić
- Bojan Krkić
- Mladen Krstajić
- Miroslav Đukić
- Zdravko Kuzmanović
- Aleksandar Luković
- Damir Kahriman
- Ljubomir Fejsa
- Filip Mladenović
- Uroš Spajić
- Predrag Mijatović
- Dejan Stanković, midfielder playing for Inter Milan since 2004; ESM Team of the Year 2006–07, 2009–10 UEFA Champions League.
- Dragan Stojković
- Sergej Milinković-Savić
- Nikola Žigić
- Marko Nikolić (born 1989), midfielder
- Marko Nikolić (born 1979), coach
- Momčilo Gavrić was a professional soccer player with OFK Beograd, Oakland Clippers, San Francisco 49ers, Dallas Tornado, and San Jose Earthquakes, from 1959 to 1978.
- Miodrag Belodedici
- Jovan Aćimović
- Radomir Antić
- Milorad Arsenijević
- Dušan Bajević
- Vladimir Beara
- Vujadin Boškov
- Ljubiša Broćić
- Vladimir Durković
- Dragan Džajić
- Milan Galić
- Milutin Ivković
- Bořivoje Kostić
- Vladimir Kovačević
- Miloš Milutinović
- Miljan Miljanić
- Zoran Mirković
- Rajko Mitić
- Tihomir Ognjanov
- Ilija Pantelić
- Blagoje Paunović
- Miroslav Pavlović
- Ilija Petković
- Vladimir Petrović
- Preki, birth name Predrag Radosavljević, Serbian-born American international; the only player to be named Major League Soccer MVP twice.
- Branko Stanković
- Dragoslav Šekularac
- Milutin Šoškić
- Aleksandar Tirnanić
- Velibor Vasović
- Todor Veselinović
- Đorđe Vujadinović
- Saša Ćirić
- Milovan Ćirić

=== Tennis ===
- Novak Djokovic (born 1987), world No. 1; 24 Grand Slams, 40 Masters 1000, 7 ATP finals, 400+ weeks in the rankings as world #1, 1st on Prize Money won list
- Janko Tipsarević (born 1984)
- Viktor Troicki (born 1986), former world No. 12 (6 June 2011)
- Nenad Zimonjić (born 1976), doubles-former world No. 1 (17 November 2008), three Grand Slams
- Jelena Janković (born 1985), former world No. 1 (11 August 2008), one Grand Slam, twelve WTA
- Ana Ivanovic (born 1987), former world No. 1 (9 June 2008), one Grand Slam, eleven WTA
- Bojana Jovanovski (born 1991),
- Kristina Mladenović (born 1993), French of Serbian parentage
- Alex Bogdanović (born 1984), British of Serbian parentage
- Ana Jovanović (born 1984)
- Irena Pavlović(born 1988)
- Aleksandra Krunić (born 1993)
- Nikola Ćirić (born 1983)
- Ilija Bozoljac
- Nebojsa Djordjevic
- Marko Djokovic
- Filip Krajinović
- Dušan Lajović
- Srdjan Muskatirovic
- Sima Nikolic
- Ika Panajotovic
- Dejan Petrovic
- David Savić
- Nikola Ćaćić
- Dušan Vemic
- Miljan Zekić
- Tamara Čurović
- Tatjana Ječmenica
- Karolina Jovanović
- Vojislava Lukić
- Teodora Mirčić
- Dragana Zarić
- Nataša Zorić
- Ana Timotić
- Slobodan Živojinović (born 1963), former doubles world No. 1 (8 September 1986), and singles No. 19 (26 October 1987)
- Momčilo Tapavica (1872–1949), ethnic Serb who represented Austria-Hungary in tennis, weightlifting and wrestling in the first 1896 Summer Olympics in Athens, Greece, and won a bronze medal in the men's singles tennis competition. He is the first Serb to win an Olympic medal. He became an architect. The Matica srpska-building in Novi Sad is his work, among many others.
- Jelena Genčić, coach of Monica Seles and Novak Đoković
- Nikola Špear

=== Boxers ===
- Nikola Sjekloća (born 1978), Intercontinental 75 kg WBC.
- Nenad Borovčanin (born 1978), current European Cruiserweight boxing champion, undefeated with 30 wins and no losses.
- Aleksandar Pejanović (1974–2011), Super Heavyweight, Bronze 2001 Mediterranean Games. Murdered.
- Slobodan Kačar (born 1957), Light Heavyweight, Olympic Gold Moscow 1980.
- Tadija Kačar (born 1956), Light Heavyweight, Olympic Silver Montréal 1976.
- Sreten Mirković (1955–2016), European Amateur Boxing Championship 1979 Silver.
- Marijan Beneš (born 1951), Light Heavyweight, European Amateur Boxing Championship 1973 Gold, European Boxing Union 1979.

=== Ice hockey ===
- For Serbian American ice hockey players, see this list.
- For Serbian Canadian ice hockey players, see this list.
- Dragan Umicevic, Swedish
- Alex Andjelic, Serbian, coach
- Ivan Prokić, Serbian
- Milan Lučić, Canadian

=== Other sports ===
- Albert Bogen (Albert Bógathy; 1882–1961), Serbian-born Austrian Olympic silver medalist saber fencer
- Jovana Brakočević, volleyball player
- Milorad Čavić, Olympic medalist in swimming
- Filip Filipović, water polo player
- Nenad Gajic, lacrosse player
- Andrija Gerić, Olympic champion in volleyball
- Nikola Grbić, volleyball player and coach, Olympic champion in volleyball
- Vladimir Grbić, Olympic champion in volleyball, member of Volleyball Hall of Fame)
- Nađa Higl, swimmer
- Danilo Ikodinović, water polo player
- Mile Isaković, Olympic champion in handball
- Sara Isaković, Olympic medalist in swimming
- Aleksandra Ivošev, Olympic champion in sports shooting
- Nataša Dušev-Janić, Olympic champion in canoeing
- Pavle Jovanovic, Serbian-American bobsledder
- Nikola Karabatić, French handball player (Serbian mother)
- Svetlana Dašić-Kitić, handball player, voted the best female handball player ever
- Radomir Kovačević, Olympic medalist in judo
- Bronko Lubich (1925–2007) was a wrestler, referee and trainer.
- Ilija Lupulesku, Olympic medalist in table tennis
- Goran Maksimović, Olympic champion in sports shooting
- Milica Mandić, Olympic champion in taekwondo
- Branislav Martinović, Olympic medalist in wrestling
- Igor Milanović is considered the best water polo player of all time
- Ivan Miljković, one of the most decorated volleyball players in the world
- Lavinia Milosovici, Romanian gymnast of Serbian origin, multiple Olympic champion
- Miloš Milošević, swimmer
- Vera Nikolić, track and field athlete, double European Champion in 800m, former World record holder
- Mirko Nišović, Olympic champion in canoeing
- Slavko Obadov, Olympic medalist in judo
- Nenad Pagonis, kickboxing champion
- Zoran Pančić, Olympic medalist in rowing
- Momir Petkovic, Olympic champion in wrestling
- Andrija Prlainović, water polo player
- Dan Radakovich, sports administrator
- Paul Radmilovic, water polo player for Great Britain in the 1912 Olympics in Stockholm
- Bojana Radulović, handball player
- Giovanni Raicevich, Greco-Roman wrestler (European Champion, 1909)
- Rhonda Rajsich, American racquetball player of Serbian origin
- Mirko Sandić, water polo player, member of FINA Hall of Fame
- Branislav Simic, Olympic champion in wrestling
- Milorad Stanulov, Olympic medalist in rowing
- Aleksandar Šapić (born 1978), Serbian politician and a retired water polo player, considered by many to be one of the greatest water polo players of all time. Beijing 2008, Athens 2004, Sydney 2000.
- Jasna Šekarić, multiple Olympic medalist in sports shooting
- Dragan Škrbić, handball player, IHF World Player of the Year 2000
- Ivana Španović, track and field athlete
- Arpad Sterbik, handball goalkeeper representing Yugoslavia and Spain (Ethnic Hungarian), IHF World Player of the Year 2005
- Dragutin Topić, track and field athlete, World junior record holder in high jump with 2.37
- James Trifunov, Serbian-Canadian Olympic medalist in wrestling
- Vanja Udovičić, water polo player
- Ljubomir Vračarević, Serbian martial artist and founder of Real Aikido
- Ljubomir Vranjes, handball player
- Vladimir Vujasinović, water polo player
- Paola Vukojicic, field hockey player
- Bill Vukovich, Serbian American automobile racing driver
- Nick Zoricic, Serbian-born, professional Canadian skier who died in Switzerland while competing
- Zoran Zorkic, golf coach in Texas
- Ivan Sarić, wrestler and a pioneer in aviation
- Velimir Stjepanović, swimmer
- Luka Stevanović, swimmer
- Andrea Arsović, sports shooter
- Tijana Bošković, volleyball player, Olympic medalist
- Maja Ognjenović, volleyball player, Olympic medalist

For Serbian-American American football players, see this list; for baseball players, see this list.

== Other ==
- George Fisher (Serbian: Đorđe Šagić; 1795–1873), American military and politician, fought in the Texas Revolution and First Serbian Uprising
- Nick Vujicic, preacher and motivational speaker
- Vesna Vulović, flight attendant. She holds the world record, according to the Guinness Book of Records, for surviving the highest fall without a parachute: 10,160 metres (33,330 ft).
- Šćepan Mali (fl. 1767–1773), impostor pretender of Montenegro, by falsely representing himself as the Russian Tsar Peter III.
- Black Mike Winage (1870–1977), Serbian-Canadian miner, pioneer, adventurer and one of the original settlers in the Yukon during the Klondike Gold Rush who lived to be 107 years old.
- Nedeljko Čabrinović, member of the Black Hand

=== Spies ===
- Dušan Popov (1912–1981), code name Tricycle, MI6 double agent, inspiration for James Bond
- Branko Vukelić (1904–1945), Soviet spy
- Mustafa Golubić, Soviet spy

=== YouTubers ===
- Bogdan Ilić (born 1996), Rapper, gamer, actor & entertainer.
- Stefan Vuksanović (born 1998), Gamer & streamer.

== Fictional and mythological characters ==
- Petar Blagojevich, accused Serbian vampire
- Arnold Paole, accused Serbian vampire
- Sava Savanović, accused Serbian vampire
- Niko Bellic, the main character of video game Grand Theft Auto IV

== See also ==
- List of Serbs of Bosnia and Herzegovina
- List of Serbs of Croatia
- List of Serbs of Montenegro
- List of Serbs of the Republic of Macedonia
- List of Serbian Americans
- List of Serbian Canadians
- List of Habsburg Serbs
- Flag of Serbia

== Bibliography ==
- Cox, John K. (2002). The History of Serbia. Westport, Connecticut: Greenwood Press. ISBN 9780313312908.
- İnal, Günseli; Arşivi, Semiramis (2005). Semiramis: Sultan'ın gözünden şenlik. YKY. ISBN 978-975-08-0928-6.
- Meram, Ali Kemal (1977). Padişah anaları: resimli belgesel tarih romanı (in Turkish). Öz Yayınları.
- Pavlowitch, Stevan K. (2002). Serbia: The History behind the Name. London: Hurst & Company. ISBN 9781850654773.
- Radojević, Mira; Dimić, Ljubodrag (2014). Serbia in the Great War 1914-1918: A short History. Belgrade: Srpska književna zadruga, Belgrade forum for the world of equals.
- Stavrides, Théoharis (2001). The Sultan of Vezirs: The Life and Times of the Ottoman Grand Vezir Mahmud Pasha Angelovic (1453–1474). Brill. ISBN 978-90-04-12106-5.
