= Vitković =

Vitković is a surname. Notable people with the surname include:

- Gavrilo Vitković (1829–1902), Serbian engineer
- Mihailo Vitković (1778–1829), Serbian poet
- Mladen Vitković (born 1990), Serbian basketball player
