= Vujević =

Vujević (Serbian: Вујевић) is a South Slavic surname. Notable people with the surname include:

- Branimir Vujević (born 1974), Croatian rower
- Goran Vujević (born 1973), Montenegrin-born Serbian volleyball player
- Pavle Vujević (1881–1966), Serbian geographer
- Robert Vujević (born 1980), Croatian footballer
