= Polača =

- Municipality
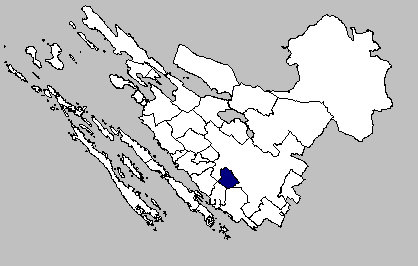
- Municipality within Zadar County
- Interactive map of Polača
- Location of Polača in Croatia
- Country: Croatia
- Region: Dalmatia
- County: Zadar County

Area
  - Municipality: 30.0 km^{2} (11.6 sq mi)
  - Urban: 10.5 km^{2} (4.1 sq mi)

Population (2021)
  - Municipality: 1,389
  - Density: 46.3/km^{2} (120/sq mi)
  - Urban: 993
  - Urban density: 94.6/km^{2} (245/sq mi)
- Website: opcina-polaca.hr

Polača is a village and a municipality in Croatia in Zadar County.

== Demographics ==
According to the 2021 census, there are 1,389 inhabitants, in the following settlements:

- Donja Jagodnja, population 126
- Gornja Jagodnja, population 93
- Kakma, population 177
- Polača, population 993

91,1% of the population are Croats. The area of Polača municipality is 30 km^{2}.

Polača: Population trends 1857–2021
v

population	833	1210	1006	1107	1278	1595	1803	1947	2476	2819	3002	2985	2619	2825	1434	1468	1389
	1857	1869	1880	1890	1900	1910	1921	1931	1948	1953	1961	1971	1981	1991	2001	2011	2021

Sources: Croatian Bureau of Statistics publications

== Politics ==
=== Minority councils and representatives ===
Directly elected minority councils and representatives are tasked with consulting tasks for the local or regional authorities in which they are advocating for minority rights and interests, integration into public life and participation in the management of local affairs. At the 2023 Croatian national minorities councils and representatives elections Serbs of Croatia fulfilled legal requirements to elect 10 members minority councils of the Municipality of Polača but the elections were not held due to the absence of candidatures.

== Notable people ==
- Jevrem Jezdić
