= Danilo Gregorić =

Yugoslavian diplomat and news editor (1900-1957)

Danilo Gregorić (Serbian Cyrillic: Данило Грегорић; 1900–1957) or Gregorič (Грегорич) was a Yugoslav diplomat to Germany and the newspaper editor for Vreme during World War II.

His father Cvetko Gregorić was the secretary of the Industrial Corporation in Belgrade, of Slovenian descent. Danilo Gregorić joined the movement of Dimitrije Ljotić, but soon left and joined the Yugoslav Radical Union of Milan Stojadinović, who knew his father. When President of the Government Dragiša Cvetković formed government, he took Gregorić, who knew perfect German, as one of his direct envoys to Germany. Gregorić was the intermediary between Cvetković and Joachim von Ribbentrop, and had a role in the Tripartite Pact talks. He was often in conflict with Foreign Minister Aleksandar Cincar-Marković. Gregorić sought to become the Minister for Propaganda, but did not succeed. When Cvetković changed his views on Germany, Gregorić was appointed the Deputy Commissioner of Vreme, subsequently the Commissioner and editor of the magazine. This was done according to the German government's wish. The tone of the magazine became pro-German, stressing that Yugoslavia needed to join the Axis powers. He was informed that tanks appeared in the streets, then left for Zemun, crossing the bridge, but was apprehended and imprisoned, on 27 March 1941, the day of the Yugoslav coup d'état. He was sentenced to 13 years of prison and forced labor on 16 August 1949 by the Communist Yugoslav court.

== Works ==
- Danilo Gregorič (1942). Samoubistvo Jugoslavije: poslednji čin jugoslovenske tragedije. Jugoistok.

== Sources ==
- Sofija Božić (1 April 2014). Istorija i geografija: susreti i prožimanja: History and geography: meetings and permeations. Институт за новију историју Србије,Географски институт "Јован Цвијић" САНУ, Институт за славистку Ран. pp. 70–. ISBN 978-86-7005-125-6.
- Cvetković, Srđan (14 April 2007). "Elita iza brave". Novosti.
- Karaulac, Miroslav (12 May 2005). "Andrić u Berlinu". Vreme. 749.
- Blic (19 December 2006). "Proces za rehabilitaciju kraljevskog namesnika". Blic.
