= Radomir Reljić =

Serbian painter and professor

Radomir Reljić (Serbian Cyrillic: Радомир Рељић) (1938 - 6 November 2006), was a Serbian painter, a professor of the Faculty of Fine Arts in Belgrade, and a member of SANU.
