= Jevrem Jezdić =

Serbian historian, publicist and writer

Jevrem Jezdić (March 13, 1916 – December 9, 1997) was a Serbian historian, publicist and writer.

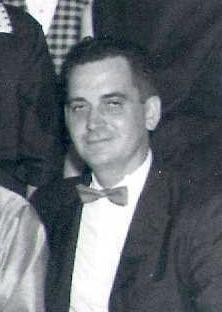
Jevrem Jezdić in 1947

== Biography ==
Jezdić was born in Polača, at the time in Austria-Hungary.

At the end of the 1950s Jezdić illegally fled to the USSR together with his wife and daughter, as a part of the so-called "informbiro" emigration. As a sympathizer of Joseph Stalin he was forced to escape to avoid persecution. When he arrived in Moscow, he was arrested under the allegation that he was a spy of the Communistic Party of Yugoslavia. He spent three months in the notorious prison Lubyanka in Moscow. He was released thanks to the initiative of some influential members of the NKVD secret police. Ana Jezdić, his wife, spent more than five months in the prison. Her health was greatly damaged in the prison, so she died by the end of 1951 from pneumonia. Jezdić remained a true communist, but he never forgave the USSR authorities for the death of his wife.

He died in Buenos Aires, Argentina.

== Philosophical work of Jevrem Jezdić ==
During his long carrier, Jezdić wrote several dozens of philosophical discussions, of which only a few were published. Criticism of the authorities was one of his dominant motives. One of his crucial works is a discussion entitled, "Instead of the Law", which has an idealistic view on anarchism. It was published only in French. One of Jezdić's early role-models was the Russian revolutionist and philosopher Mikhail Bakunin, because of his tempestuous life. The most colorful character from Jezdić’s novel "Contempt" is a mysterious old man Aleksei Krinkop, who shouts: "Where authorities exist, freedom is gone", which is a motto of several anarchistic groups. This character was based upon the Russian philosopher, historian, and writer Peter Kropotkin. Jezdić also wrote the analysis of the Russo-Japanese War, and the Russian Revolution of 1905.

== Bibliography ==
- Proudhon and mutualism
- The defeat of the Paris commune
- The materialism of Lenin
- Ils se comportent comme s'ils étaient la loi (Substitute for the law)
- The defeat of the individual will
- The lost revolution (1949)
- In chains (1962)
- Molestation (1965)
- Foibe (1967)
- The small town child (1972)
- Eyes in the fog (1977)
- The massacre in the church of Glina (1982)
- The contempt (1983)
- The feast (1983)
- The years that disappeared (1989)
- Cristal nights (1990)
- Argentinian nights (2000)
