= Uroš Dojčinović =

Serbian classical guitarist (born 1959)

Uroš Dojčinović (Serbian Cyrillic: Урош Дојчиновић, born 1959 in Belgrade) is a Serbian classical guitarist.

He is professor of classical guitar at the Music school "Josip Slavenski" in Belgrade. He is also a composer and pedagogue.
