= Pavle Stamatović =

Serbian writer, historian, and priest

Pavle Stamatović Павле Стаматовић
- Born: 11 April 1805; Jakovo, Military Frontier
- Died: 14 September 1864 (aged 59); Novi Sad, Austrian Empire
- Education: Royal University of Pest

Pavle Stamatović (11 April 1805 – 14 September 1864) was a Serbian writer, historian, and archpriest. He chaired the delegation of South Slavs at the Prague Slavic Congress, 1848. He was also a member of Matica Srpska.

== Biography ==
He was born in the town of Jakovo at a time when Srem was under Habsburg rule. He finished his primary and secondary education in Jakovo, Sremski Karlovci, and Buda. He studied philosophy and theology at Sremski Karlovci and Pest. In his last year at the Royal University of Pest, he became acquainted with Ljudevit Gaj, who happened to enroll at the same time when he was in his graduating year. In 1832 he became a monk in Pest and later, as a parish priest of the Church of St. Nicholas, Szeged, from 1834 to 1844, he edited and published a Serbian almanac Srbska pčela (Serbian Bee) which had a significant circulation. He was transferred from his parish in Szeged to Novi Sad. There he continued to publish his almanac and joined Matica Srpska. He was elected president of Matica Srpska in 1831 and served as the editor of Letopis Matice Srpske 1831–32. Stamatović was a corresponding member of the Society of Serbian Letters from 11 June 1842 (now part of the Serbian Academy of Sciences and Arts).

At the Szeged Lycée he initiated a student society called Mlado Jedinje promoting the study of Slavic languages and works of literature; published an almanac, Srbska pčela ili novi cvetnik for more than a decade (1830–1841); composed an ode to Slavic unity and brotherhood (Slava slavenska u Evropi, 1837); translated from Polish the monumental "Historya prawodawstw slowianskich" (History of Slavic Legislation) by Wacław Maciejowski; and the pioneering work "Prawda ruska" by Ignacy Benedikt Rakowiecki (1783–1839). He translated many Russian, Polish and Czech articles on Slavic affairs. He also wrote a book called Mladyj Serbljin u vsemirnom carstvu, published in Buda in 1834.
