= Ljiljana Crepajac =

Serbian scholar (1931–2018)

- Љиљана Црепајац
- Born: 1931
- Died: 2018 (aged 86–87); Belgrade, Serbia

Ljiljana Crepajac (Serbian Cyrillic: Љиљана Црепајац) (1931–2018) was a Serbian classical scholar, philologist, and a full professor at the University of Belgrade Faculty of Philosophy where she taught historical grammar of Old Greek; she was the head of the Department of Classics (since 1994), and she has been a full professor since 1987.

Crepajac graduated from the Faculty of Philosophy, University of Belgrade, where she received a PhD; she obtained her MA degree at the University of Copenhagen. She was fluent in English, German, Russian, Italian and French, as well as in Latin and Old Greek.

== Selected works ==
- Doctoral thesis: On the Prefix a in Classical Languages (1973),
- A textbook: Stoiheia Hellenika - the Elements of Greek Glotollogy (1967);
- Papers from Hellenic Glotology;
- Primary Synesthesis in Indoeuropean,
- Indoeuropaische Gutturale im Greichischen und mykenische Zeugnisse;
- Zur Etymologie von griech sidaros und /s/ mudros;
- Pelastian Proto-Slavonic Relations According to the Researches of Milan Budimir

=== Translations ===
From Ancient Greek:

- Aristotle's Politics;
- Sophocles' Oedipus Rex;
- Aristophanes' Ecclesiazusae;

From Latin:

- Tacitus' Annals
