= Srdjan Ilic =

Serbian photographer for the Associated Press

- Born: 1966 (age 59–60)
- Occupation: Press photographer
- Website: http://www.srdjanilicphotography.com

Srdjan Ilic (born 1966) is a photographer from Serbia who worked twenty years for the Associated Press. From 2012 to 2016, he was a director of photography at Tanjug, a Serbian news agency. He is also head of the Association of Photographers of Serbia. From 2016 to 2020 worked for Pixell, a photo agency in Zagreb. From 2016 on works as photo editor at Insajder Produkcija.

== Biography ==
After studying hydrogeology at Belgrade University, Ilic began working for various news media in Serbia starting in 1984. He went on to work for the Associated Press from 1990 until 2010, covering middle east crisis in Iraq, Iran, Jordan, the attempted coup in Russia, the Balkan wars, local parliamentary elections and sporting events. He was wounded three times while doing his job during the various Yugoslav conflicts. Ilic became the director of photography at Tanjug in 2012. Since 2016, he worked for the Pixell agency, shooting photos in Serbia.

Ilic has a World Press Photo Award for Spot News and a World Press Photo Children's Award. He received both prizes in 1999 during the Kosovo conflict. He has also won two APME-Associated Press Managing Editors Awards, as well as several YU Press Photo awards, from a national photo contest held in Serbia. He has participated in various group photo exhibits, such as a show on contemporary news photography held at the Manhattan gallery Apexart and curated by David Byrne. Other group shows include a Belgrade exhibit on war photography at the Museum of Yugoslav History, as well as another exhibition held in Serbia and initiated by the European Fund for the Balkans. Ilic is married with two children.
