= Olya Ivanisevic =

Serbian fashion model

- Born: Olga Ivanišević; 28 April 1988 (age 38); Belgrade, SFR Yugoslavia
- Modeling information
- Height: 1.79 m (5 ft 10 1/2 in)
- Hair color: Brown
- Eye color: Brown

Olya Ivanisevic (Serbian: Оља Иванишевић / Olja Ivanišević) (born 28 April 1988) is a Serbian fashion model. She has been on the cover of Italian "Flair" (April 2008), "Marie Claire" (November 2008), "Velvet" (November 2009); and the Serbian Elle (May 2010).
