= Sara Mitić =

Serbian model and beauty pageant titleholder

- Born: Sara Mitić; 8 February 1995 (age 31); Niš, FR Yugoslavia
- Height: 1.78 m (5 ft 10 in)
- Beauty pageant titleholder
- Title: Miss Universe Serbia 2017; Miss Bikini Balcan 2012; Miss Tourism Europe 2013; Miss Adriatic Europe 2013
- Hair color: Brown
- Eye color: Green
- Major competitions: Miss Universe Serbia 2017 (Winner)

Sara "Sari" Mitić (born 1995) is a Serbian model and beauty pageant titleholder. She was Miss Adriatic Europe 2013 and first runner-up at Miss Serbia 2016.

== Early life and pageantry ==
Sara was born and raised in Niš, Serbia. She has engaged in ballet, swimming, and tennis. In 2017 she was a law student, who also played college volleyball.

Sara started modeling at 12 years of age and participated in many beauty pageants. She won Miss Bikini Balcan 2012, Miss Tourism Europe 2013, Miss Adriatic Europe 2013, and Miss Porto Carras 2016. She was the 1st runner-up to Miss Serbia 2016.

In 2017 she presided over Miss Adriatic Europe.

Awards and achievements
| Preceded by Bojana Bojanic | 2018; Sara Mitić | Succeeded by Maja Marčič |
