= Radomir Stević Ras =

Serbian painter, illustrator and designer

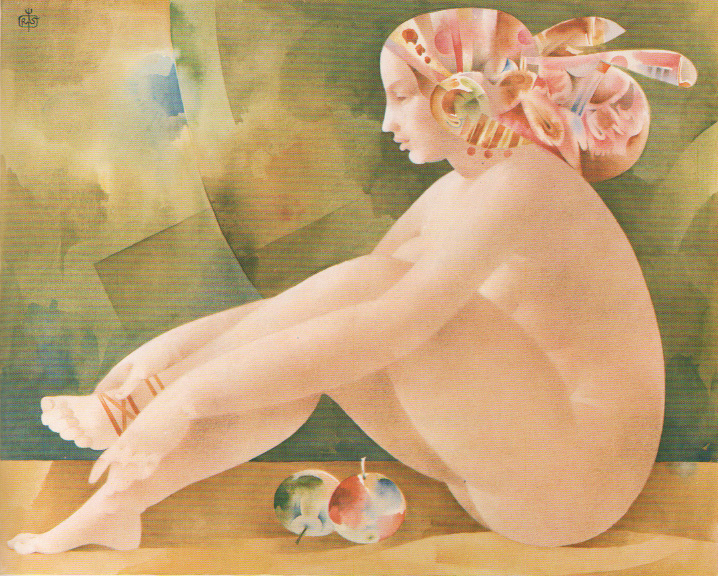
'Particles' by Radomir Stevic Ras

Radomir Stević Ras (26 February 1931 – 22 November 1982) was a Serbian painter, illustrator and designer. He was also founder and owner of a private theatre in the former Yugoslavia that exclusively presented work of domestic authors.

== Biography ==
Ras was born in the village of Prekopuce (Toplica District). He was the third child of Borivoj and Kruna Stević. After completing his training in metal working (at various provincial towns in Serbia) he went to Belgrade to study at the Belgrade Academy of Art under Professor Mihajlo S. Petrov.

Works of Radomir Stević Ras are exhibited in the Gutenberg Museum in Mainz, Germany; The Russian Academy of Sciences, Moscow, Russia; Royal Library of Belgium, Brussels, Belgium; Fords Museum, San Francisco, USA and the National Museum of Serbia, Belgrade, Serbia.

Ras was married to Eva Ras (Serbian Actress, writer, and painter). Eva was his muse and model for many of his paintings. He was the father of writer and journalist Vuk Stević Ras (1957 - 2017) and also of the youngest published Serbian writer Kruna Ras (1969 - 1993).

He died on 22 November 1982 in Belgrade.

== Selected works ==
- Alphabet according to Ras
- Illustrations for the following books 'Blood that glows' by Branko Miljković, 'Vera Pavldoljska' by Matija Bećković, 'A letter to Haralamije' by Dositej Obradović, 'The Beginning of the Revolt against Dahijas' by Filip Višnjić and 'Serbia' by Oskar Davičo
- Eva za Sarojana (painting)
