= Dimitrije Vladisavljević =

Serbian priest, teacher, writer, grammarian and translator

Dimitrije Vladisavljević (1788 in Srem – 1858 in Trieste, Austrian Empire) was a Serbian priest, teacher, writer, grammarian and translator.

Vladisavljević compiled and wrote the first Serbian Grammar for Italian-speakers in Trieste in 1849. Also, he translated from German to Serbian the work of August Ludwig von Schlözer's Vorbereitung zur Weltgeschichte für Kinder (1779), under the title Priprava za istroiju svega svijeta radi djece, which was published by Vuk Karadžić in Vienna in 1864. Vladisavljević's friendship and esteem were reciprocated by Vuk Karadžić who took care of the posthumous publication and other Vladisavljević's works, destined for the Serbian community school in Trieste.

A contemporary of Petar II Petrović-Njegoš, Vuk Karadžić and Niccolò Tommaseo, Vladisavljević met and corresponded with them all. Serbian physician writer Dimitrije Frušić of Trieste was his family doctor at the time that he was the principal of the "Jovan Miletić" Serbian National School in Trieste.

Before the turn of the 19th century, Trieste did not lag very much behind Vienna, the then capital of the Holy Roman Empire. On 20 March 1777, the Governor of Trieste, Karl von Zinzendorf, told the representatives of the Greek-Illyrian community that they could employ, at their own expense Greek- or Illyrian-language teachers, as the Slavic language of the Serbian Orthodox Church was then called.

The first government-sponsored public school in Vienna was established in 1771, and in 1774 the Allgemeine Schulordnung, or "General School Ordinance" on the law on compulsory primary education came into force in Trieste. The first German school in Trieste was inaugurated in 1775, immediately after came the Italian, Jewish (1781), Serbian and Greek (1792), and Slovene (1798). The school scheme was the work of Silesian reformer Johann Ignaz von Felbiger, no longer in Latin, but in the language of the common folk.

Dimitrije Vladisavljević is remembered for his prolific correspondence with several Serbian writers, poets, and scholars, including Niccolo Tommaseo with whom he corresponded in Serbian. Vladisavljević was one of the earliest teachers and cultural workers in the influential Serbian community of Trieste.
