= Stefan Stefanović =

Serbian writer and playwright

- Born: 1807; Novi Sad, Austrian Empire, today Serbia
- Died: 1828 (aged 20–21); Novi Sad, Austrian Empire, today Serbia
- Occupation: writer

Stefan Stefanović (Serbian Cyrillic: Стефан Стефановић; 1807–1828) was a Serb writer and playwright. He is best remembered for the popular play about Stefan Uroš V of Serbia.

== Biography ==
Stefan Stefanović, who lived and worked in Novi Sad and Budapest, is said to have been only nineteen years of age when he wrote the 1826 tragic drama "Death of Stefan Uroš V the Last Serbian Tsar", which would place his birth about the year 1807. He was Vuk Karadžić's disciple. He wrote an "Ode to Vuk Karadžić" in the same reformed language that Vuk was advocating, and had it published in Srpski Letopis in 1826. Stefanović read German authors in the original language and translated them into modern Serbian. He was an ardent admirer of Schiller. He preferred a life of study and writing to the military service in which his peers were distinguished. He basically lived all his life in Novi Sad where he was born and Pest, Hungary, where he studied.

His drama, Death of Uroš V the Last Serbian Tsar, was inspired by Serbian Patriarch Pajsije I Janjevac (1614–1647) who wrote the biography of the last Serbian emperor, Uroš, and composed a service to him. Stefanović's drama about the life and death of the last Serbian tsar — Stefan Uroš V of Serbia — was frequently performed and it was popular at the time. It is assumed that such a theatrical performance must have been the source of inspiration for the painting of the scene subject by Serbian artist Novak Radonić in 1857.

Stefan Stefanović died in 1828, in Novi Sad, afflicted with tuberculosis. He was 21. On his tombstone, his sister gave the date of birth and death: "1807–1828."
