= Đorđe Prudnikov =

Đorđe Prudnikov (Serbian Cyrillic: Ђорђе Прудников, Djordje Prudnikoff) (19 April 1939 – March 2017) was a Russian-Serbian painter, graphic artist, and designer.

== Biography ==
Prudnikov was born in Užice in 1939, his family moved to Belgrade in 1946. He enrolled at the Belgrade Academy of Applied Arts (now part of the University of Arts in Belgrade), where he graduated in the class of professor Mihajlo Petrov. He has been claimed as one of the most original contemporary artists to emerge from the former Yugoslavia.

Đorđe Prudnikov died in Belgrade in March 2017, at the age of 77.
