= Branibor Debeljković =

Serbian artist

Branibor Debeljkovic (Serbian Cyrillic: Бранибор Дебељковић), (1916-2003) was a Serbian artist, researcher and historian professor of photography at the University of Arts in Belgrade, Serbia.

== Biography ==
Debeljkovic was born in 1916 in Pristina, Kingdom of Serbia (Now Kosovo). He was the first member-photographer of ULUS (Serbian association of artists) and founder of section of photographers of ULUPUS (Serbian association of artists of applied arts). He was the First Serbian historian of photography.

Debeljkovic was the author of several condensed reviews of history of Serbian photography as well as original works "Old Serbian Photography" (published by Serbian National Library)and the monograph "First Exhibition of Amateurs photographers in Belgrade in 1901". Debeljkovic was the author of numerous exhibitions and texts on photography.

He was a member of the German Society for Photography (DGPh) and the European Society for the History of Photography (ESHPh).

Debeljkovic died in 2003, in Montreal, Quebec, Canada.
