= Zoran Manević =

Serbian historian (1937–2019)

Zoran Manević (1937 – 4 April 2019) was a Serbian architectural historian. He published a number of books in his field, and is a board member of Arhitektura i urbanizam magazine and president of the Club of Architects.

Manević died on 4 April 2019, at the age of 81–82.

== Bibliography ==
- Mihajlo Mitrović: izložba arhitekture (1971)
- Zlokovićev put u modernizam (1976)
- Arhitektura i politika : (1937–1941) (1984)
- Arhitektura XX vijeka (1986)
- Graditelji (1986)
- Tradicija i savremeno srpsko crkveno graditeljstvo (1995)
- Aleksandar Đokić (1995)
- Stojan Maksimović: stvaralaštvo (2006)
