= Miloš Mladenović =

Serbian historian

Miloš Mladenović (1903–1984) was professor emeritus of History at McGill University in Montreal, and an expert on Cold War politics.

== Biography ==
Miloš Mladenović was born in Valjevo, Serbia, in 1903. He studied at the University of Belgrade's Law School between 1922 and 1926, and graduated with a Bachelor of Commerce and Law. At that time he seemed to be destined for a long, diplomatic career, however, World War II intervened. After World War II, Miloš Mladenović settled temporarily in Western Europe. Unwilling to return to Yugoslavia under a Communist regime, Mladenović chose to settle in Canada permanently. A polyglot and with degrees (in law and economics) from the University of Belgrade in Serbia and a Ph.D. from the Sorbonne in Paris, respectively, Mladenović joined the Department of History at McGill University as a specialist on Eastern Europe in June 1950. He immediately proceeded to expand the department's offerings in Russian and Byzantine history. Six months later, he was also joined by his wife (Gertrud) and stepson (Peter Schaal, now a prominent Toronto surgeon).

Witness to the Slav tragedy of World War II, the German occupation of Czechoslovakia, Poland, and the Kingdom of Yugoslavia, the Nazi attempt at invading Russia, Mladenović aroused not only a desire but a need for a better understanding of Slav people and their countries among the McGill staff and students he taught. He is credited with revitalizing the Department of History at McGill with his lectures and life experiences. Mladenović was not only a scholar but a diplomat in the service of the Kingdom of Yugoslavia before the war. He was a staunch anti-Communist.

McGill University's biographer Stanley Brice Frost wrote: "Miloš Mladenović, who came to this country in 1950 as a Political refugee, originally from Yugoslavia, and who almost singlehandedly introduced the serious study of Russian and East European history, not only to McGill but also, through his former students, to many other Canadian universities."

Professors Veljko Lalich, Waclaw Babinski, and Dr. Theodor F. Domaradski, Mladenović's counterparts at the University of Montreal, often invited him to offer courses at their Department of Russian and Slavic Studies. Mladenović was a sought-after speaker outside of the academic community, too. The Canadian Forces, in collaboration with McGill University, invited Mladenović to conduct seminars on Soviet Law for the Faculty of Law, and arrange conferences at various units stationed in the Province of Quebec.

In his spare time, Mladenović prepared and published a series on Eastern Europe, as well as early articles on the Serbs in Canada for the Canadian Encyclopedia, book reviews for The Montreal Star, and a study of East European Law in Canada for Bulletin zur Ostforschung. From 1964 to 1974, Mladenović was editor of the scholarly journal The New Review which focused on Eastern Europe.

In 1969, his students presented Professor Mladenović with a Festschrift to commemorate his 65th birthday. Entitled "Eastern Europe: Historical Essays," the book contained essays from nineteen current and former students. "At one time in the 1970s, seven departments of history, two of political science, and one of Byzantine studies were chaired by his former students," wrote J. L. Black.

== Oeuvre ==
Mladenović authored several books and published numerous studies and articles in various magazines and journals of learned societies. His books and manuscripts were published mainly in French, Serbian, German and English and include:

- Le caractere de l'etat serbe au moyern age (1930);
- L'etat serbe au Moyen Age (1931);
- Stanoje Stanojevici i istorija srpskog srednjevekovnog prava (1938);
- Zakonik Leke Dukacina (1938);
- Dve srpske geopoliticke studije: Sta je geopolitika?;
- The New Yugoslav Historiography and the Problem of Feudalism in Medieval Serbia (1956);
- Serbische Familiennamen osmanischer Herkunft (1960);
- Die Herrschaft der Osmanen in Serbien im Licht der Sprache (1961);
- Lazni idoli i varljivi ideali (1965);
- Family Names of Osmanli Origin in Bosnia and Herzegovina (1976);
- Kako su dvojica siromaka postali politicki emigranti (1984);
- Selo Do u ratu i revoluciji: Roman (1984);
- Samostalan i organizovan zlocin: Roman (1984);
- Andjeo unistenja;
- Umece letenja;
- Geopoliticke sile na Sredozemnom moru (1994).

== See also ==
- Dimitrije Najdanović
