= Pavle Vujević =

Serbian geographer (1881–1966)

Pavle Vujević (Serbian Cyrillic: Павле Вујевић, 10 August 1881 – 17 November 1966) was a Serbian geographer and meteorologist, professor of climatology, meteorology, and mathematical geography at the University of Belgrade. He was a founder of the science of micro-climatology, and one of the first in the science of potamology, the study of rivers.

== Work ==
Serbia undertook some significant developments in meteorology with academics Pavle Vujević, Director of Belgrade Observatory at the time, and renowned climatology pioneer Milutin Milanković, who was a good friend of Vujević's.

Vujević is famous for his book Basis of Mathematical and Physical Geography. He wrote about the island of Hvar, and proved that Hvar is a better place for healing than other resorts along the Mediterranean coastline. Also, an outstanding potamological study of the Tisa river was made by Vujović in 1906.

He was a full member of Serbian Academy of Sciences and Arts and a recipient of numerous awards.
