= Gavrilo Vitković =

- Born: Гаврило Витковић; January 28, 1829; Buda, Austrian Empire
- Died: July 25, 1902 (aged 73); Negotin, Kingdom of Serbia
- Occupations: an engineer, historian, professor and collector of old manuscripts
- Known for: being a member of the Serbian Learned Society

Gavrilo Vitković (Serbian Cyrillic: Гаврило Витковић; January 28, 1829 – July 25, 1902) was an engineer, historian, professor and collector of old manuscripts. He was a member of the Serbian Learned Society.

== Biography ==
After graduating from the University of Budapest, Vitković worked as an engineer in Smederevo and Šabac. Later, he taught engineering in secondary schools in Kragujevac and Belgrade. And in his spare time he collected original documents and manuscripts mostly about 18th- and 19th- century people from Serbia and granted his collection to the National Library of Serbia.
