= Battle of Pljevlja =

Battle of the Yugoslav Resistance

- Part of the Uprising in Montenegro, World War II in Yugoslavia
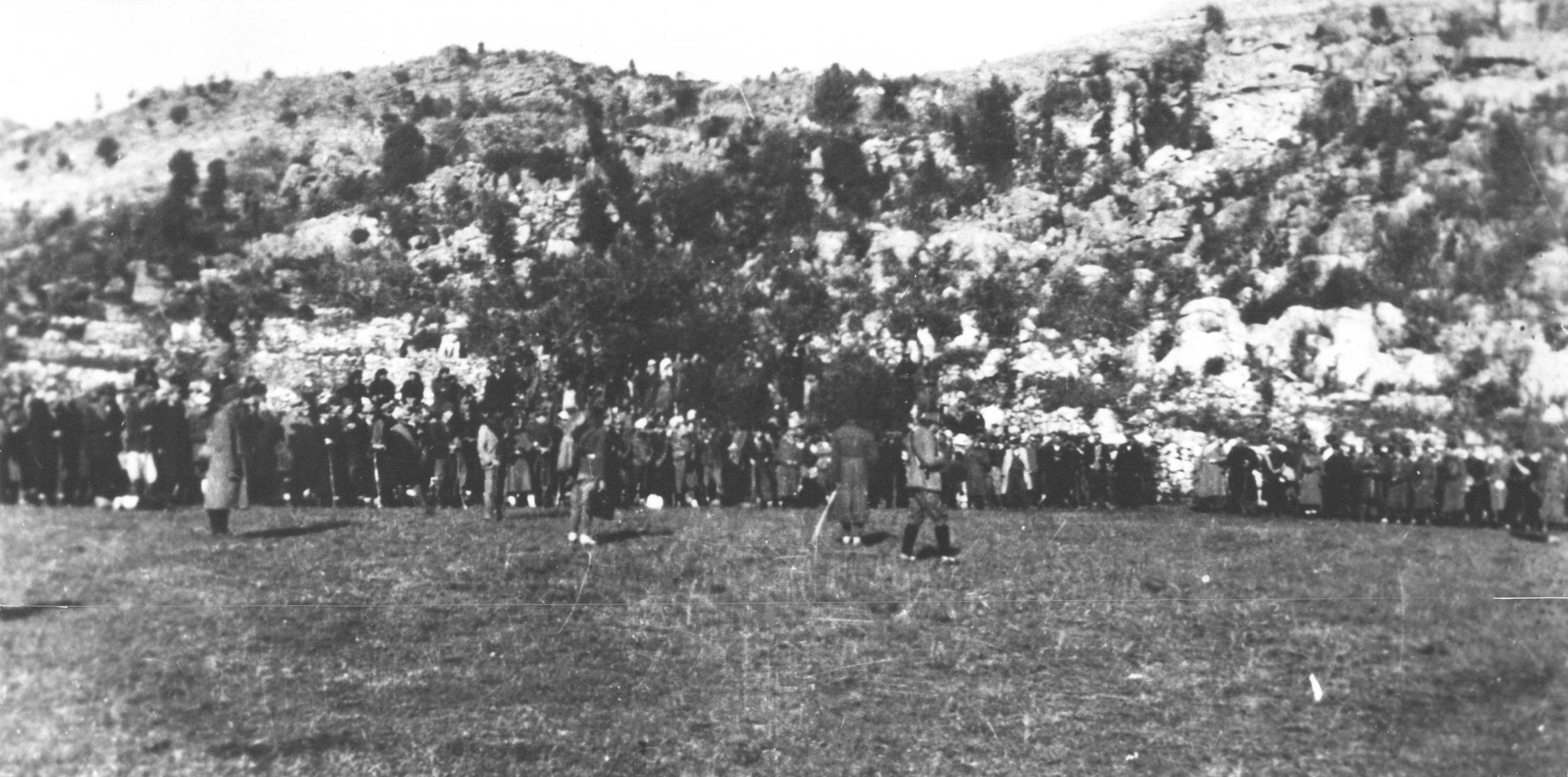
- Partisans before the battle
Date	1–2 December 1941
Location	Pljevlja, Italian governorate of Montenegro, Axis-occupied Yugoslavia
Result	Italian victory: Defeat of Partisan forces

Belligerents
Montenegrin Partisans	Italy

Commanders and leaders
Arso Jovanović	(Kingdom of Italy) Giovanni Esposito

Units involved
Kom detachment; Zeta detachment; Lovćen detachment; Bijeli Pavle detachment; Piva battalion; Prijepolje company	(Fascist Italy) 5th Alpine Division "Pusteria"

Strength
4,000	2,000

Casualties and losses
203 killed 269 wounded	73 killed 171 wounded 8 missing/captured
- more than 23 citizens of Pljevlja

The Battle of Pljevlja (1-2 December 1941), was a World War II attack in the Italian governorate of Montenegro by Yugoslav Partisans under the command of General Arso Jovanović and Colonel Bajo Sekulić, who led 4,000 Montenegrin Partisans against the Italian occupiers in the town of Pljevlja.

== Background ==
In 1941 the area had been occupied by Italian forces trying to attack Greece On 1 November 1941, the Supreme Command of insurgent forces began planning to attack Pljevlja. On 15 November, the Regional Committee of the Yugoslav Communist Party for Montenegro, Boka and Sandžak ordered all insurgent forces in the region to begin preparing for the assault. Ivan Milutinović wanted to liberate the towns of Pljevlja and Priboj with intent to gain arms, food and clothing for larger operations in Montenegro, as well as to connected liberated territory around Žabljak with Užice Republic. Partisan High Command was opposed to the attack. According to Arso Jovanović, the Italians had prepared for an entire month before the battle, with forces from Brodarevo and Bijelo Polje being redeployed to Pljevlja. Italian command in Pljevlja was alerted about attack by an informant on 29 October, and started preparing for defense of the city.

== Involved forces ==
General Arso Jovanović commanded the 4,000 partisan troops which were split into several groups: the Kom, Zeta, Lovćen and Bijeli Pavle detachments, the Piva battalion and the Prijepolje company.

The Italian garrison in Pljevlja belonged to the 5th Alpine Division Pusteria; it was led by General Giovanni Esposito and had a strength of 2,000 men.

== Battle ==
In the evening of 30 November the Partisans cut the phone lines linking Pljevlja to Prijepolje and Čajniče, thus isolating the Italian garrison. At 2:15 on 1 December the first Partisan attacks on Italian outposts around Pljevlja began, and at 2:50 the general assault was launched. After suffering heavy losses, at 5:00 the Partisans managed to capture an old Ottoman fort located on a hill known to the Italians as the "Fortino" ("small fort") and to penetrate the town; the officers' mess and the depots of the 11th Alpini Regiment were then captured, whereas an attack on the headquarters of the 11th Alpini Regiment was repelled. Another group of Partisans stormed the jail, freeing three prisoners, and another one attacked the power station, capturing the ground floor and the first floor after fierce fighting; the Italian detachment guarding the power station, however, barricaded itself on the second floor, and managed to hold on until the arrival of a relief group of fifty engineers forced the Partisans to withdraw.

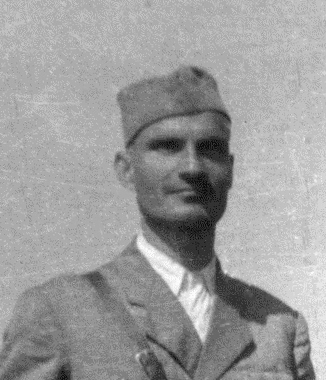
Arso Jovanović

After securing the "Fortino" and the jail, the Partisans attacked the Italian artillery positions, which were nearly overrun; the artillerymen, however, repelled the attack with small arms fire and hand grenades. In the southern sector, an attack on the Italian outpost guarding the road to Nikšić was likewise repelled; in the eastern sector, the Partisans pressed their attacks against the Italian outposts guarding the roads to Prijepolje and Golubinje, capturing the latter. Between 3:35 and 3:40 the Partisans occupied the high school, the Orthodox church, the movie theater and the houses surrounding the divisional headquarters, which was thus isolated. At 4:30 the Partisans attacked the divisional headquarters, but were repelled; half an hour later they occupied the divisional hospital, capturing 34 soldiers from the medical corps, and surrounding the headquarters of the 5th Alpine Artillery Regiment. An attack on the latter, however, was repulsed.

As the defenders of the divisional headquarters were short on ammunition, a relief group of thirty men carrying ammunition was sent to their help, but they were almost completely killed or wounded by Partisan fire. At 5:15 the Partisans launched another attack on the divisional headquarters, but were repelled again; at 7:00 another Partisan group attacked the headquarters of the 5th Alpine Artillery Regiment, using captured Italians as human shields, but were likewise forced to retreat, abandoning the prisoners they had captured. At 7:20 two Italian squads stormed the Orthodox church, whose bell tower had become a Partisan sniper's nest, and set it on fire.

At dawn the Italians started their counterattack; the 145th Alpini Company and a platoon from the 144th attacked the "Fortino" and recaptured it by 9:00, and at 10:30 Italian artillery began shelling the Partisan-occupied depots and officers' mess. In the meantime, two machine gun squads were sent in another relief attempt of the besieged divisional headquarters; despite heavy casualties caused by heavy gunfire from Partisans occupying the movie theater, the attempt was successful, after which an Italian 75/13 mountain gun was brought into position and destroyed the movie theater. At 15:30 the siege of the divisional headquarters was lifted, and Italian squads set out to eliminate snipers still holding out in the surrounding buildings. Several Partisans were captured and executed on the following day, along with seventeen civilians who had been hiding them. The headquarters of the 5th Alpine Artillery Regiment was still under siege; an Italian relief attempt was repelled by Partisans barricaded in a group of nearby buildings, and nightfall brought the battle to a stop.

Operations resumed at 8:00 on 2 December, and at 9:00 the siege of the 5th Alpine Artillery headquarters was lifted. The last Partisan holdouts were eliminated during the morning. In the early afternoon of 2 December, the battle was over - the Partisans had failed to capture Pljevlja and retreated with heavy casualties, some 203 were killed and 269 were wounded.

== Aftermath ==
Following the battle, many Partisans deserted their units and joined the pro-Axis Chetniks. In order to reinforce the defense of Pljevlja, the Italian units had abandoned Nova Varoš, Čajniče, Foča and Goražde. Nova Varoš was taken by the Partisans a few days later, while the other three towns were captured by the end of January 1942 after the local Chetniks were driven out.

Partisan forces began plundering nearby villages and executing captured Italians, party "sectarians" and "perverts". The communists killed at very old Orthodox priest Serafim Džarić and Archimandrite of Monastery of the Holy Trinity of Pljevlja who was forced by high-ranking officers and intelligence officers of the pro-Axis Chetniks, to hide and feed in the monastery premises an extreme Zbor group of the so-called Black Troyka made up of Bozidar Bozo Milic known by the nickname Bozo Bjelica, Vladimir Sipcic and Srpko Medenica who are on behalf of the Yugoslav National Movement brutally liquidated family members and prominent citizens of Pljevlja and its surroundings who were anti-monarchists and sympathizers of the partisan movement. Partisans The partisans also shot Dobrosav Minić the director of the Pljevlja Gymnasium who gave to the members of Yugoslav National Movement a list of grammar school students with republican views on social order and sympathizers of the partisan movement. After the battle Italian troops blocked the city to search for remaining partisans. Shops were closed until 4 December, and everyone was forced to hand over their weapons to Italians under treat of death of entire family and burning of the family home. Many Italian soldiers used the chaos to loot the city, size of their theft was estimated at over 2 million dinars. In the aftermath 31 suspected Partisans were executed by Italian troops. Italians burnt down few villages in the aftermath of the operation. Largest killing happened village of Crljenice, which was blocked and bombarded heavily by artillery, and then Italians executed 38 villagers, including 10 children.

The defeat of the Partisans at Pljevlja and the terror campaign conducted by left-wing elements of the Partisan movement, led to further conflict between the two groups. The various ideologies of the Partisan factions in Montenegro eventually led to civil war. The leader of the resistance movement in occupied Yugoslavia, Josip Broz Tito, disapproved of the attack. When he received word of the planned assault, Tito issued two orders not to attack Pljevlja. On 7 December 1941, Moša Pijade wrote a letter to Tito and requested an investigation into the defeat at Pljevlja.

The Battle of Pljevlja was the last major action of the Uprising in Montenegro and resulted in the expulsion of Partisan forces from the region. On 21 December 1941, the Kom, Lovćen, Bijeli Pavle and Zeta detachments were incorporated into the 1st Proletarian Brigade.

After the battle, the command of Montenegrin Partisans called for the recruitment of women, issuing an announcement which invited the sisters of deceased insurgents to join Partisan forces.

== Legacy ==
The Serbian novelist, Mihailo Lalić, wrote about the battle in one of his works, in which he emphasized that local Muslims committed war crimes during this action. On 1 December 2011, the 70th anniversary of the battle, a ceremony was held at the monument to the fallen Partisans on Stražica Hill overlooking Pljevlja, which was attended by Montenegrin President Filip Vujanović. He stated that 236 Montenegrin Partisans were killed during the battle, along with another 159 people from Pljevlja and the surrounding area. The monument commemorates the deaths of 412 Partisans and other victims of World War II.
