= Veliko Golovode =

Veliko Golovode Велико Головоде
- Village
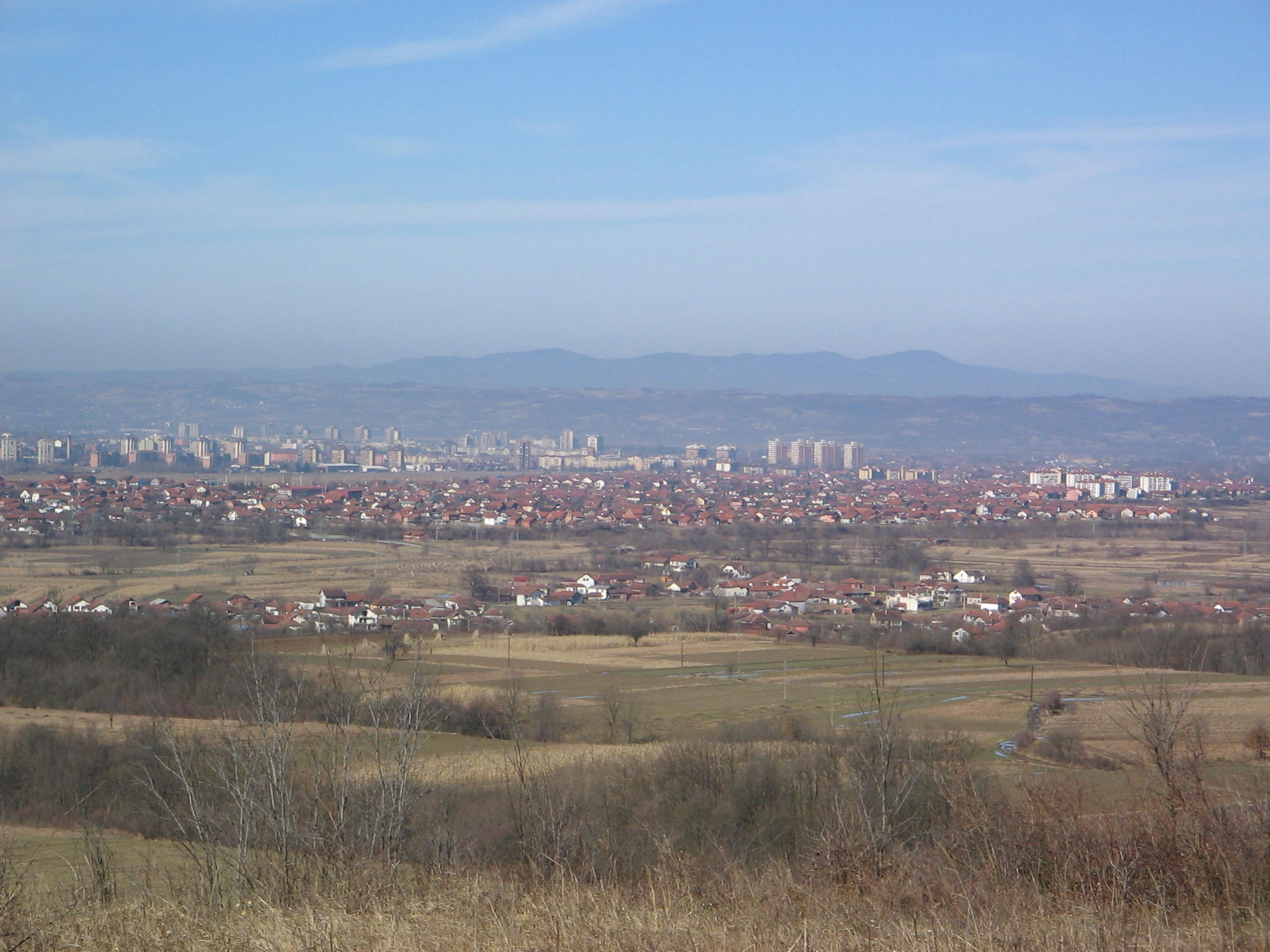

- Location within Serbia
- Coordinates: 43°32′50″N 21°21′36″E
- Country: Serbia
- District: Rasina District
- Municipality: Kruševac
- Elevation: 430 ft (130 m)

Population (2011)
  - Total: 801
- Time zone: UTC+1 (CET)
  - Summer (DST): UTC+2 (CEST)
- Postal code: 37207

Veliko Golovode is a village in the city of Kruševac, Serbia. According to the 2011 census, the village has a population of 801 people.

== Geography ==
Veliko Golovode village forms a rough triangle with the villages of Modrica and Mudrakovac, south of the main urban area of Kruševac.

It is located at an elevation of about 163 meters above sea level. The Rasina River flows through the village and just through this part of its flow is known for gold deposits.

== Gallery ==
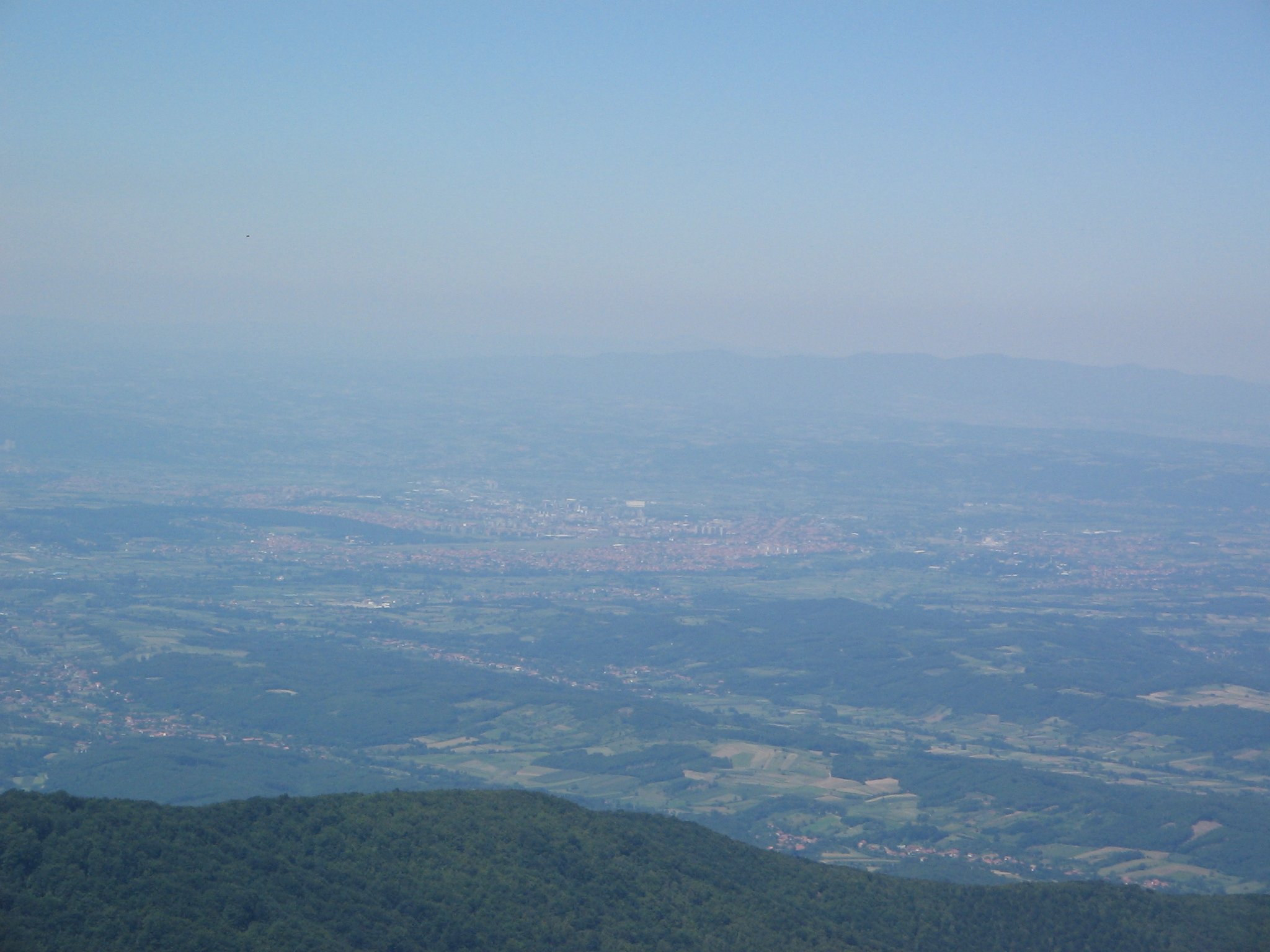
Kruševac basin from "Bela stena" peak (Jastrebac mountain)

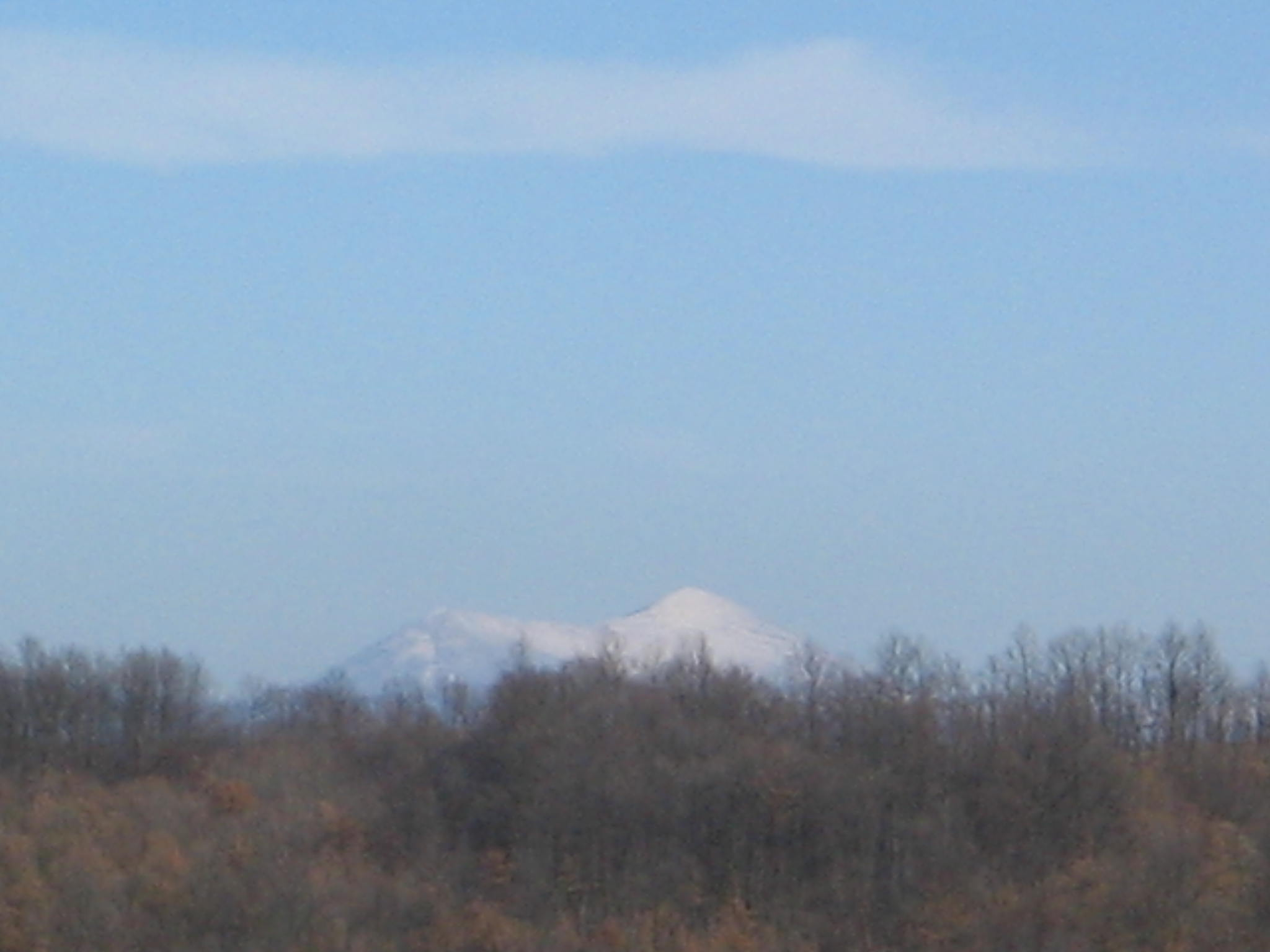
Rtanj mountain(Peak Siljak 1565m)seen from Golovode

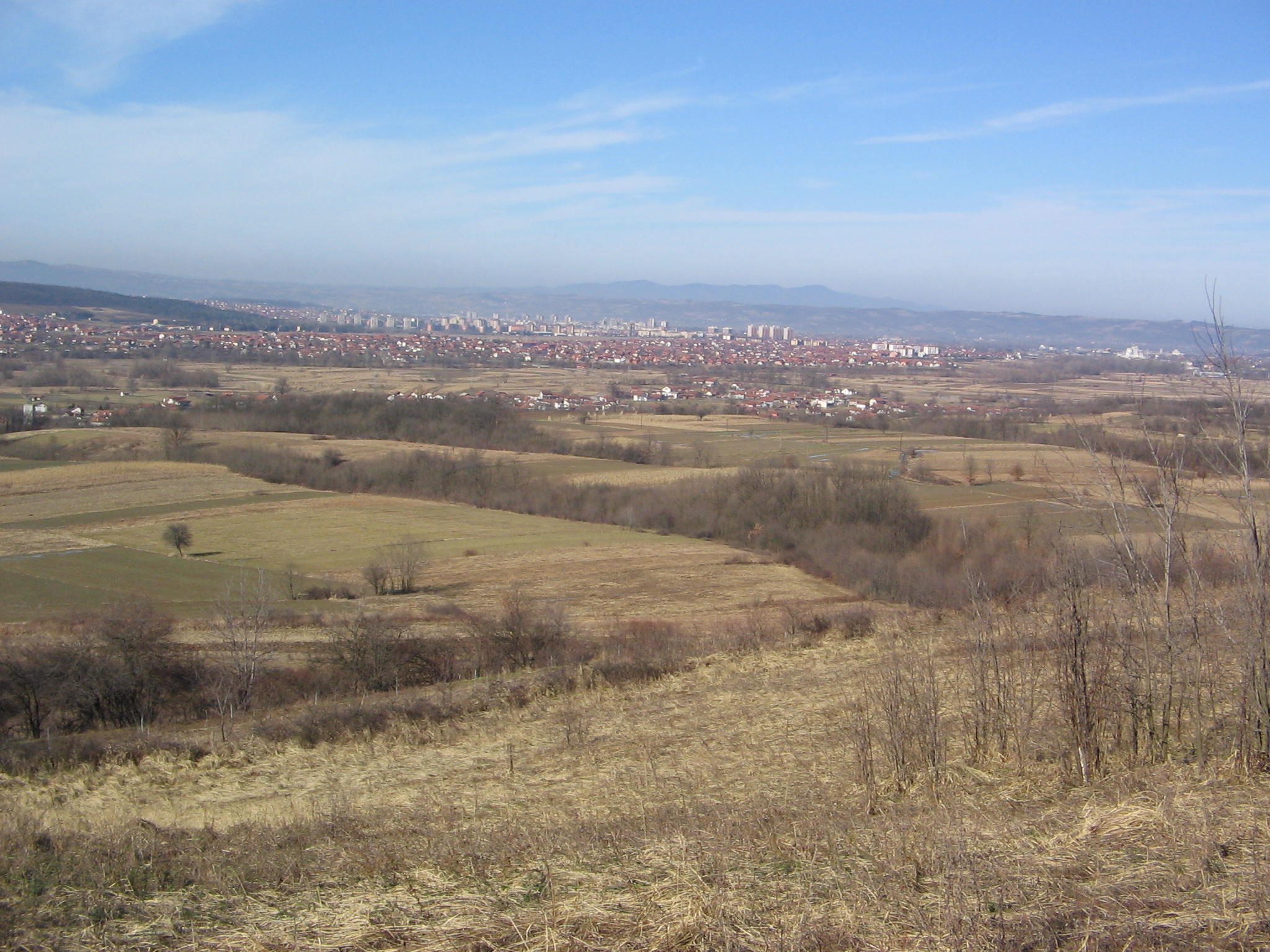
Golovode and Kruševac suburbs, Mudrakovac, Bagdala and Rasadnik

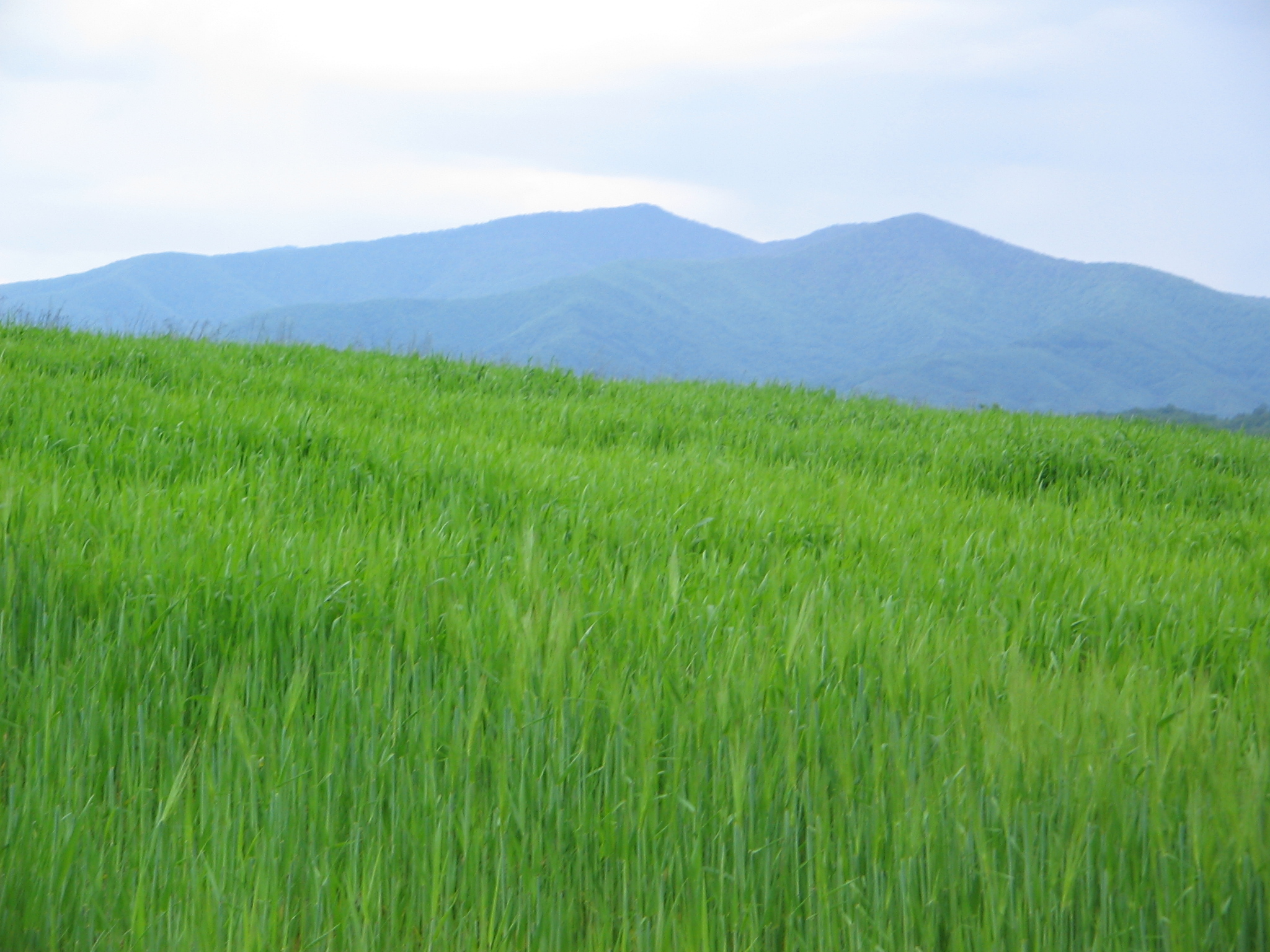
Mountain Jastrebac seen from Golovode

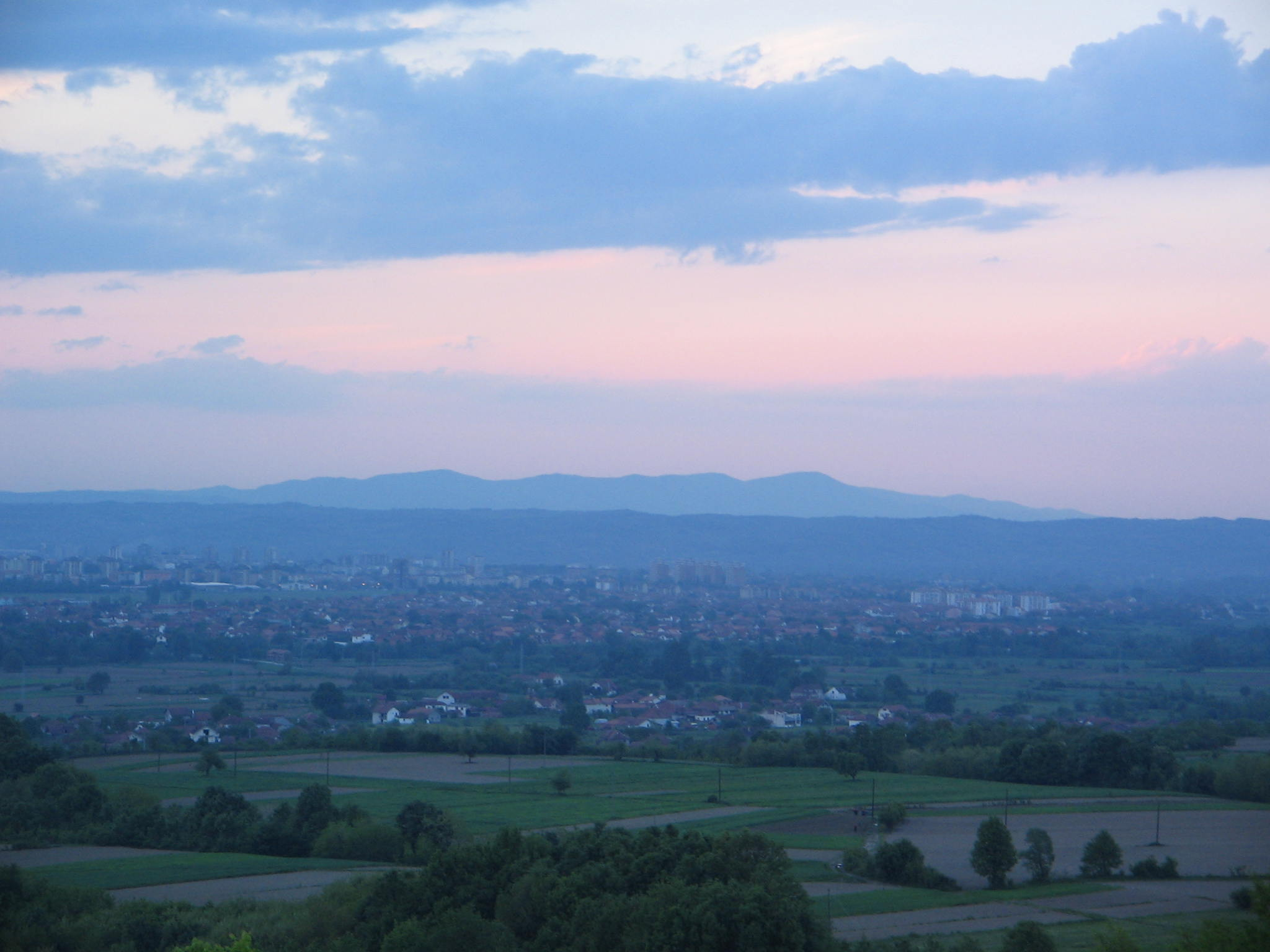
Veliko Golovode, Kruševac in sunset, Goč in the background
