= Pljevlja =

Town and municipality in Northern Montenegro

Pljevlja Пљевља
- Town and municipality
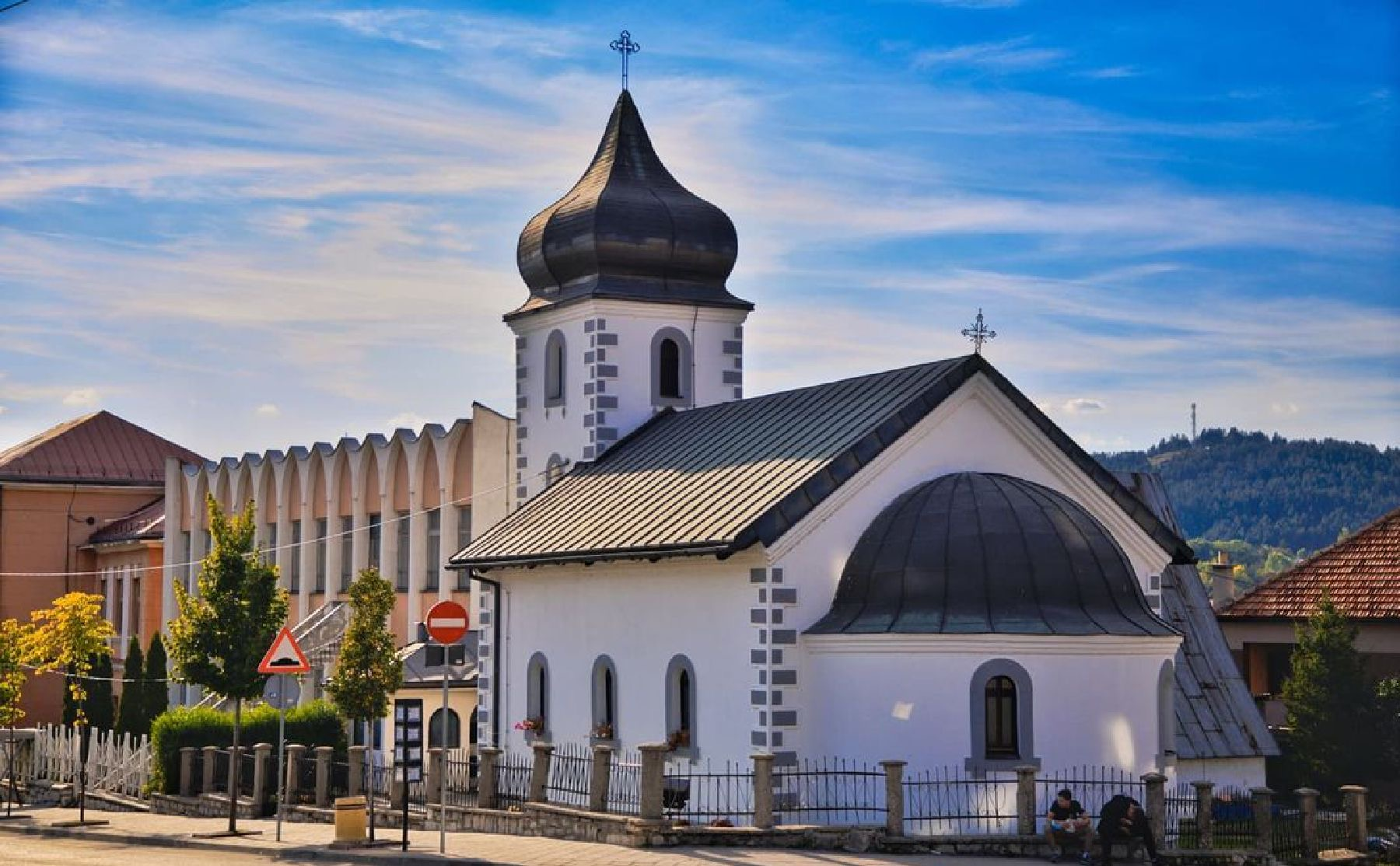
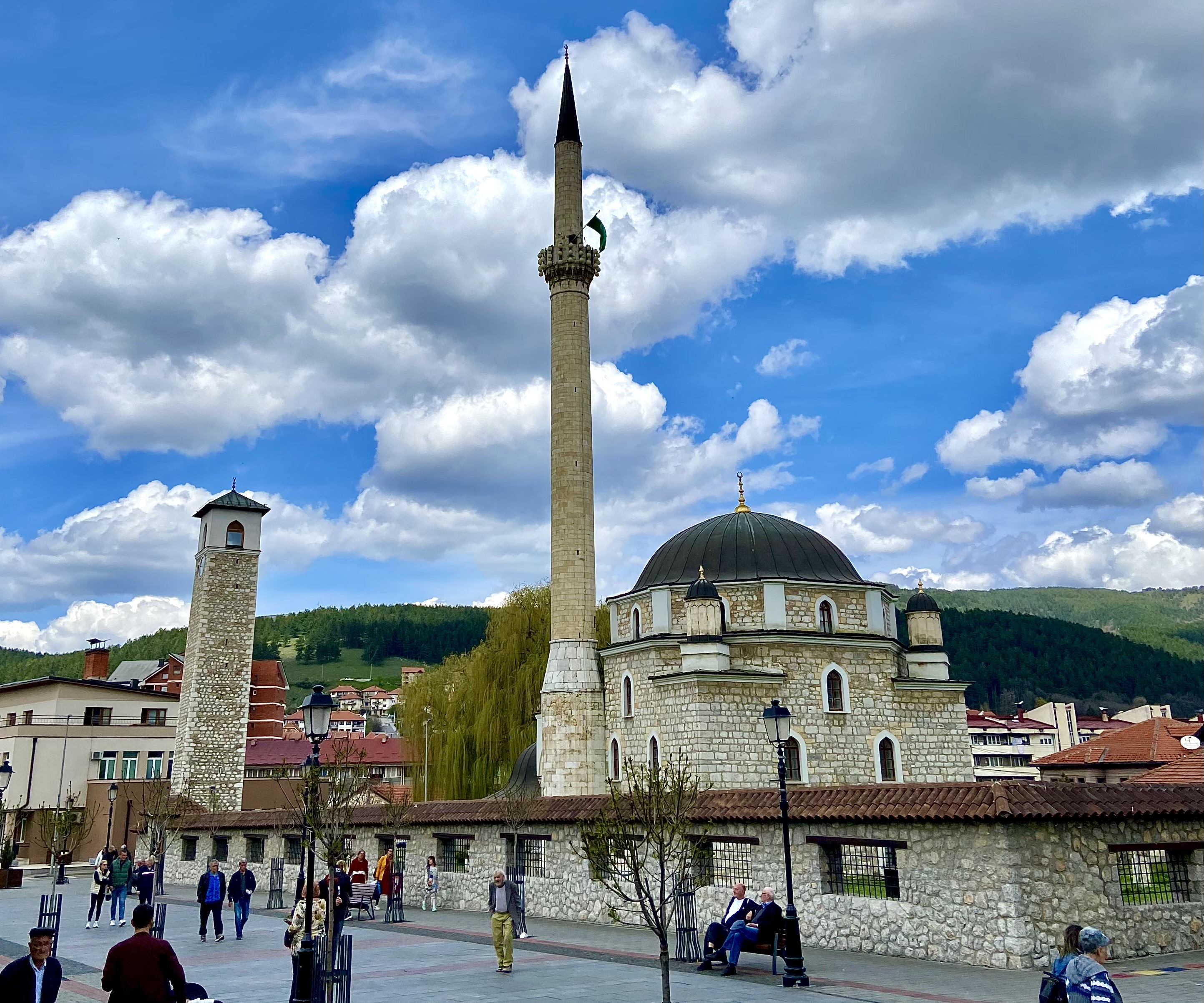
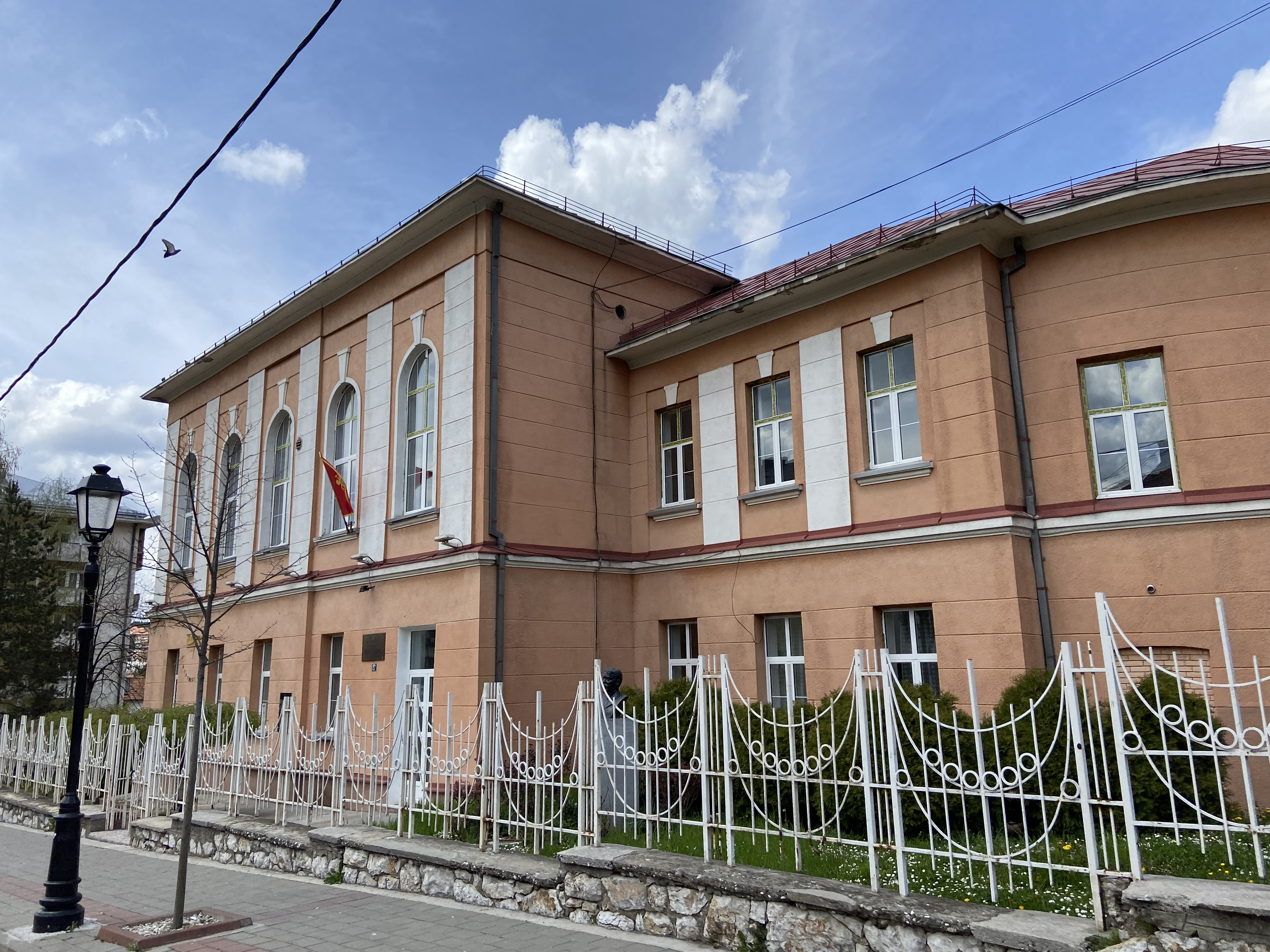
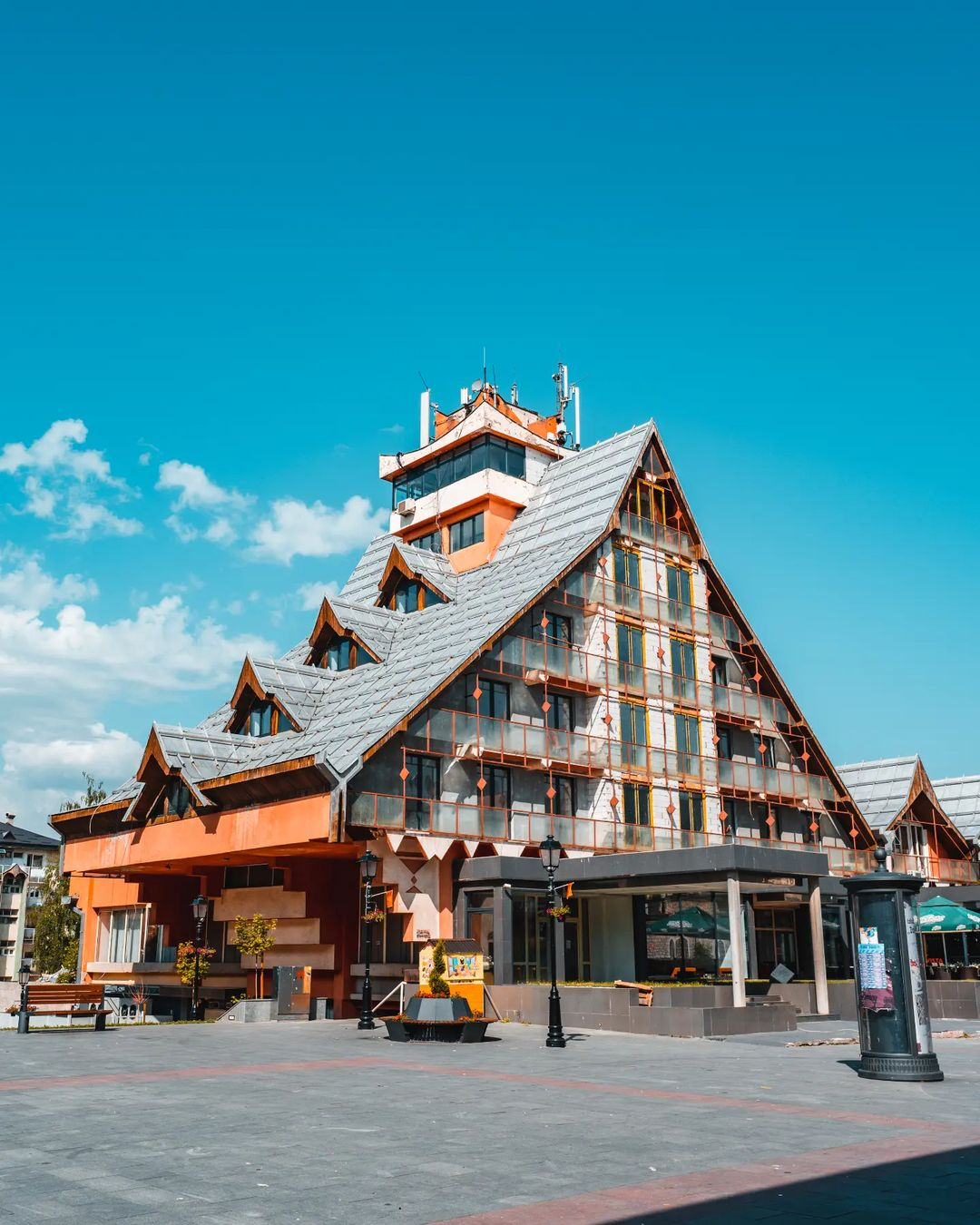
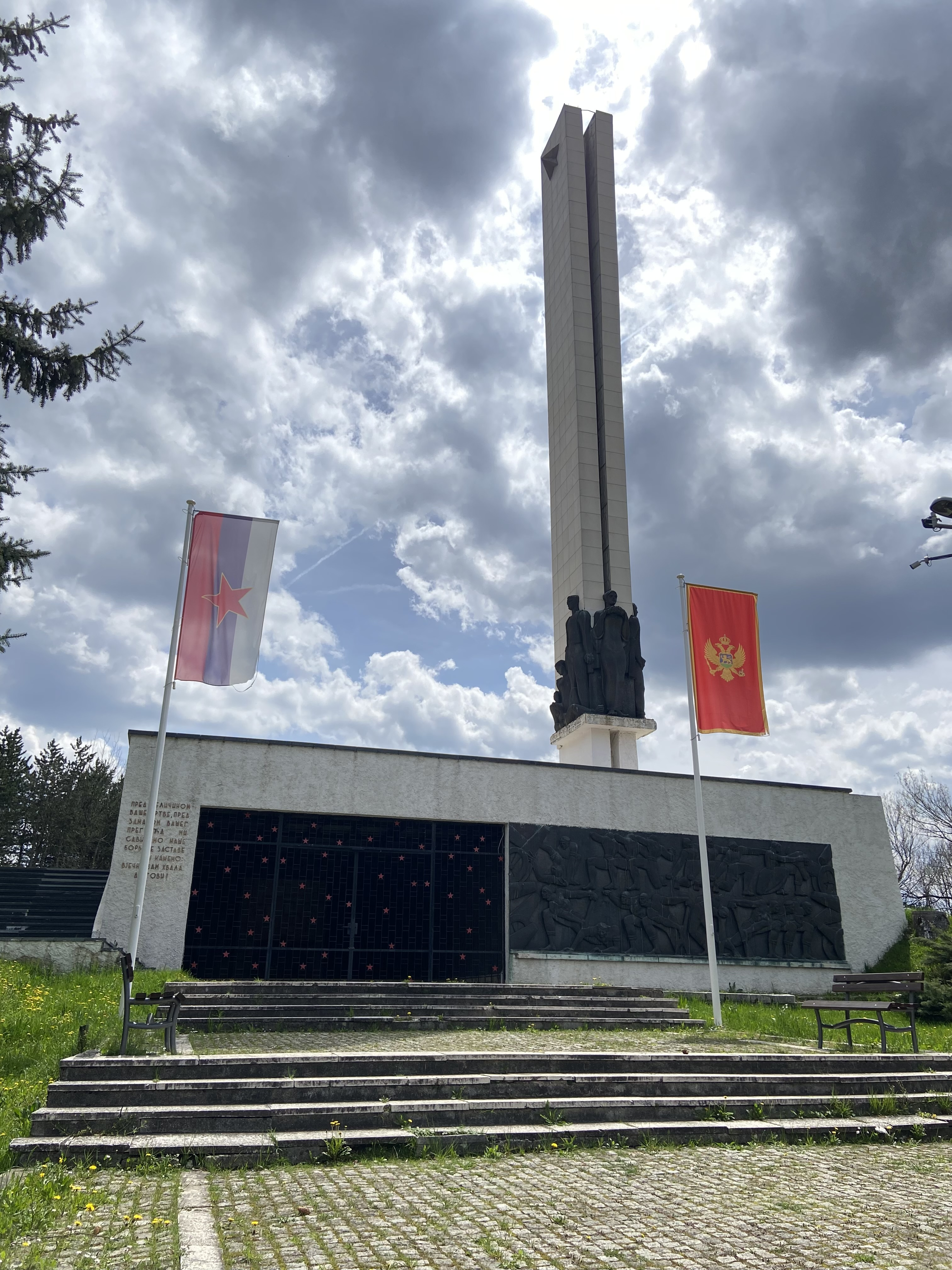
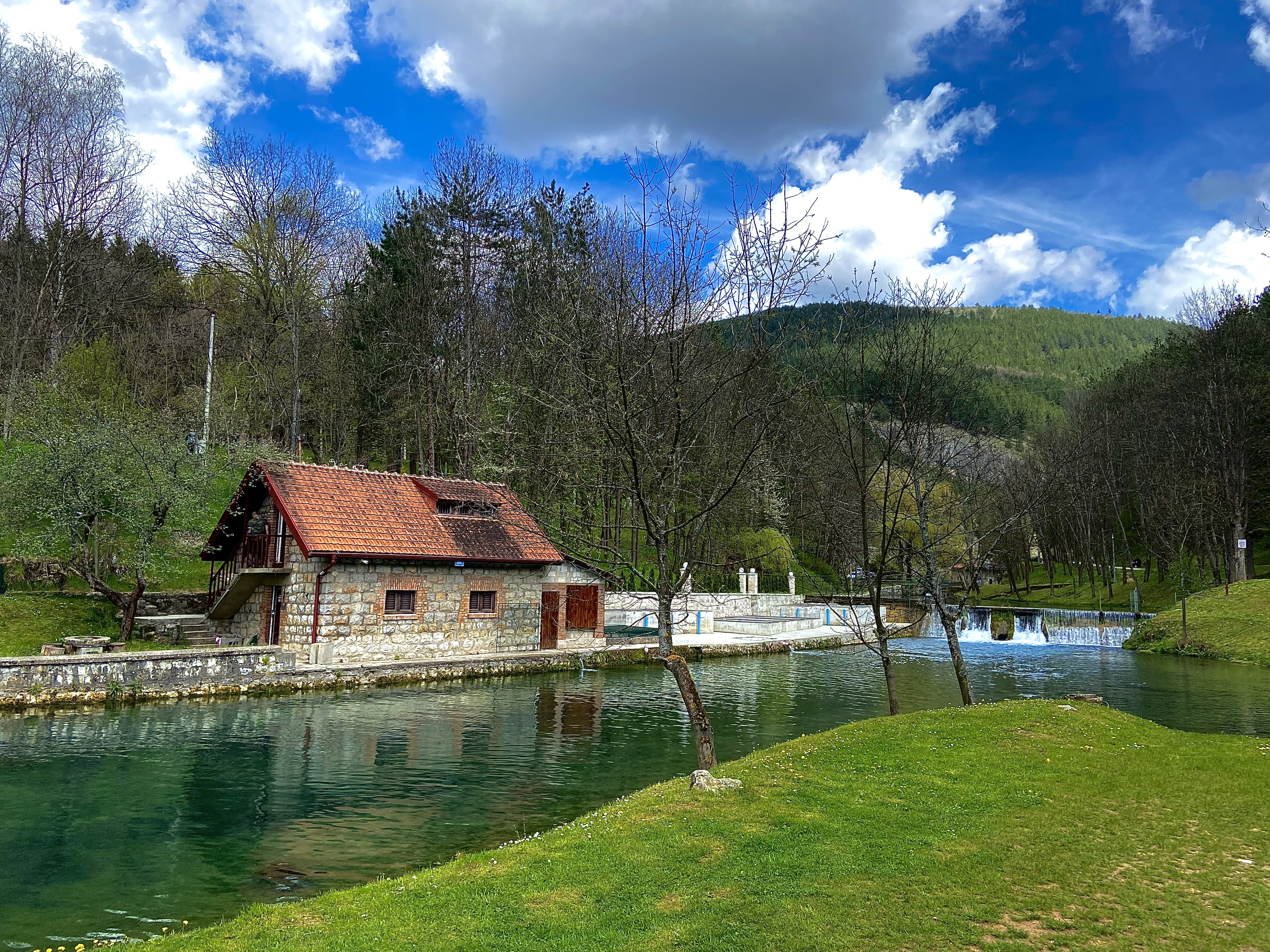
- Church of St. Paraskeva Husein Paša Mosque Tanasije Pejatović Gymnasium Hotel Pljevlja “December 1st” Monument Vodice Park

- Flag Coat of arms

- Location within Montenegro Pljevlja (Europe)
- Country: Montenegro
- Region: Northern
- Municipality: Pljevlja
- Founded: Between the 6th and 7th centuries
- Settlements: 153

Government
  - Type: Mayor-Assembly
  - Mayor: Dario Vraneš (NSD)

Area
  - Town and municipality: 1,346 km^{2} (520 sq mi)
- Elevation: 770 m (2,530 ft)

Population (2023 census)
  - Rank: 9th in Montenegro
  - Density: 27/km^{2} (70/sq mi)
  - Urban: 16,111 ▼
  - Rural: 8,023 ▼
  - Municipality: 24,134 ▼
- Demonym(s): Pljevljan(s) (en); Pljevljak(cnr, male); Pljevljanka (cnr, female)
- Time zone: UTC+1
  - Summer (DST): UTC+2 (CEST)
- Postal code: 84210
- Area code: +382 52
- ISO 3166-2 code: ME-14
- Car plates: PV
- Climate: Cfb
- Website: http://www.pljevlja.me/

Pljevlja (Montenegrin Cyrillic: Пљевља, pronounced [pʎêʋʎa]) is a town located in the Northern Region of Montenegro, situated along Ćehotina river.

The town lies at an altitude of 770 m (2,530 ft). In the Middle Ages, Pljevlja had been a crossroad of the important commercial roads and cultural streams, with important roads connecting the littoral with the Balkan interior. In 2023, the municipality of Pljevlja had a population of 24,134, while the city itself had a population of 16,111. The municipality borders those of Žabljak, Bijelo Polje and Mojkovac in Montenegro, as well as Bosnia and Herzegovina to the west and Serbia to the northeast. With a total area of 1,346 km^{2} (520 sq mi), it is the second largest municipality in Montenegro.

== History ==
=== Prehistory and antiquity ===
The first traces of human life in the region date between 50,000 and 40,000 BC, while reliable findings show that the Ćehotina River valley was inhabited no later than 30,000 BC. The oldest traces of human presence in the town area, a flint tool, had been found in the cave under Gospić Peak. The traces of settlements in the later stages of the Stone Age were found in two large archaeological sites called Mališina Stijena and Medena Stijena (around 10,000 stone tools and arms), dating to 12,000–8,000 BC. During the Bronze and Iron Age, since around 2,000 BC up until the Roman conquests, a large number of necropolises with tumuli, as well as fortified settlements rose along the Ćehotina valley, especially around villages of Mataruge, Kakmuža, Hoćevina and Gotovuša. The tumuli found in Ljutići, Gotovuša and Borovica have been archeologically researched.

=== Roman era ===
The Romans had a town built on the ruins of their town, and it was called Municipium S, located in the Komini neighbourhood. Several hundred artifacts from the Komini necropolis including a diatreta or cage cup, a glass vase trimmed with blue glass threads, are kept in the Heritage Museum Pljevlja.

=== Middle Ages ===
In the Middle Ages, the region of Pljevlja was also a part of nucleus of the Serbian state under the Nemanjić dynasty, until the end of the rule of the Emperor Stefan Dušan. After his death, Pljevlja was under the rule of Serbian autonomous rulers Vojislav Vojinović and Nikola Altomanović. After the defeat of Altomanović 1373 by the joint forces of Serbian lord Lazar Hrebeljanović and Bosnian Ban Tvrtko I, the region of Pljevlja became part of the eastern section of the Kingdom of Bosnia, subsequently part of Sandalj Hranić's province and later the Duchy of Saint Sava.

=== Ottoman Empire ===
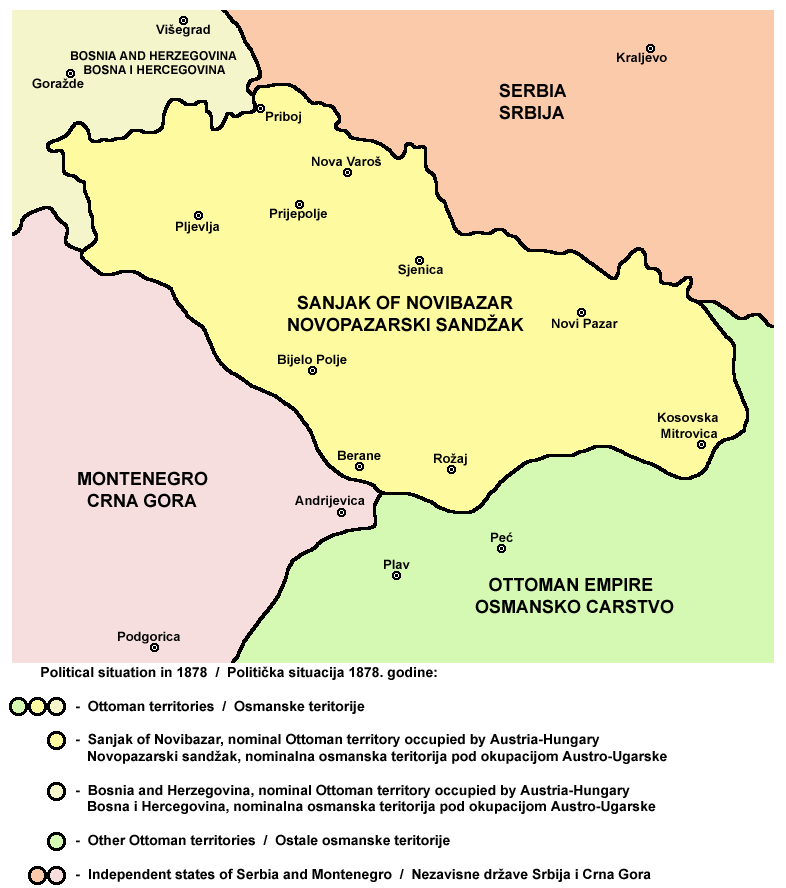
Pljevlja was located within the Ottoman Sanjak of Novi Pazar. In 1880 the town became the capital of the Pljevaljski Sanjak (Sanjak of Taşlıca) of the Ottoman Empire, which existed until the First Balkan War in 1912.

In 1465, the Ottoman Empire conquered Pljevlja. During the Ottoman offensive, the fortress of Kukanj, the residence of Stjepan Vukčić Kosača, was destroyed. Fearing an onslaught, many merchants, almost all feudal land owners and wealthier population fled from Pljevlja, seeking refuge in the Republic of Venice, Republic of Ragusa, or further north into the Kingdom of Hungary or Austrian Empire. In Turkish, the town was known as Taslıca ("rocky").

In the Ottoman defter (census book) of 1475/76, the majority of local inhabitants were Eastern Orthodox Christian, numbering some 101 households. The town was expanded into a kasaba, a larger Ottoman city without a fortress. The 15th and 16th centuries were a period of much construction in the city: in 1465 the Holy Trinity Monastery was founded, in 1569 Husein-paša's mosque was built and during the 16th century the city got a sewage system. When the center of Sanjak of Herzegovina was moved to Pljevlja from Foča in 1572, the city started to change rapidly: urban housing increased: there were 72 houses here in 1468, 150 in 1516, and 300 in 1570; in the 17th century Pljevlja had around 650 houses in the city center and over 400 in the surrounding area. The first Muslim religious school (madrasa) was built in the 17th century; waterworks were constructed in the 18th century. The Russian consul visited Pljevlja in the 19th century and wrote that Pljevlja was a very beautiful oriental city with gardens and fountains, mosques and churches and over 800 houses in the city center (7,000 citizens) which made Pljevlja the second largest city in the Herzegovina Sanjak besides Mostar. After two big fires that burned the city center to the ground, the city's economy was ruined. That was the reason for displacing the center of Herzegovina to Mostar in 1833. After 1833 the city stagnated in both an economic and cultural sense.

In 1875, after a failed uprising, mass emigration took place around Pljevlja in the direction of Užice, Valjevo and the Drina river basin.

=== Austro-Hungarian and Ottoman control after the Berlin Congress ===
As a result of the Congress of Berlin in 1878, Pljevlja and the rest of the Sandžak region were given to Austria-Hungary, interrupting Ottoman rule in the area for the first time in four centuries. However, by 1879, a special convention between Austria-Hungary and the Ottoman Empire transferred western parts of the Sanjak of Novi Pazar into dual jurisdiction between Austria-Hungary and the Ottoman Empire. In 1880, Pljevlja was named the capital of the newly formed Sanjak of Pljevlja (in Turkish: Taşlıca Sancağı). Administration remained in Turkish hands, with Austro-Hungarian military presence in the cities of Pljevlja, Prijepolje and Priboj. Some 5,000 Austro-Hungarian soldiers and their families came to Pljevlja. As a result, Austro-Hungarian businesses expanded in Pljevlja; the first modern drug store was opened in 1879, a photo store in 1892, and a hospital in 1880. The Austro-Hungarian Army built the first brewery in Pljevlja in 1889. The Pljevlja brewery's annual production was limited to 2,000 hectoliters, and demand was greater than what the brewery could produce. As a result, the Austro-Hungarian garrison in Pljevlja consumed most of the beer produced there.

In 1901, the Pljevlja Gymnasium was built by the Serbian Orthodox Church, with the approval of the Ottoman administration. As a result of the Bosnian crisis, Austria-Hungary withdrew its forces from Pljevlja in 1908. From 1908 to 1912, Pljevlja remained under the control of Young Turks. In the first days of the First Balkan War Pljevlja was freed on 26 October 1912.

=== Incorporation into Montenegro and Yugoslavia ===
On 8 October 1912 Montenegro was the first of the Balkan states to declare war on the Ottoman Empire, starting the First Balkan War. As a result, territories with significant populations of Serbs and Montenegrins were subject to conflict between the Ottoman occupation and incoming armies of Serbia and Montenegro. This was particularly the case with Sandžak, in which Pljevlja had been wedged in an Ottoman Sanjak between Montenegro and Serbia. By 28 October 1912 Ottoman forces had been completely removed from Pljevlja when the Royal Serbian Army's Javorska brigade arrived, which was accompanied by 150 soldiers from Montenegro. With the departure of Ottoman forces, Montenegro and Serbia eliminated the Ottoman "wedge" in the Sandžak and now shared a border. On 13 November 1913 a formal border agreement between Serbia and Montenegro was signed by Serbian general Miloš Božanović and Montenegro's Minister of Education and Religious Affairs, Mirko Mijušković. As a result of this agreement, Pljevlja was formally incorporated into the Kingdom of Montenegro.

From 1929 to 1941, Pljevlja was part of the Zeta Banovina of the Kingdom of Yugoslavia. At the beginning of the Second World War Pljevlja, like the rest of Sandžak, was occupied by NDH Ustaše forces. Notable Muslims from Pljevlja, Bijelo Polje and Prijepolje wrote to Pavelić and expressed their loyalty to the Independent State of Croatia allegedly in the name of all Muslims of Sandjak. By September 1941 Ustaše left Sandžak which was occupied by Italian forces within Italian governorate of Montenegro. The Battle of Pljevlja, fought on 1 December 1941 between attacking Partisans and the Italian Pljevlja garrison, was the biggest battle of the Uprising in Montenegro. In April 1942 Italians established a battalion of Sandžak Muslim militia in Metaljka, near Čajniče, composed of about 500 Muslims from villages around Pljevlja and Čajniče. A little later a command post of Sandžak Muslim militia was established in Bukovica, near Pljevlja. In February 1943, over five hundred civilians were killed during the Bukovica massacre.

Since the end of 1943 Pljevlja belonged to the German occupied territory of Montenegro and after the war to Yugoslav Socialist Republic of Montenegro.

=== Breakup of Yugoslavia ===
During the breakup of Yugoslavia, Pljevlja was the site of intense tension, with its Muslim community subject to intimidation and violence. On 6 August 1992 a local warlord named Milika "Čeko" Dačević walked into Pljevlja's police headquarters to ask that a vehicle which was seized be returned to his personal envoy, threatening to "declare war" on Pljevlja. Over half of the police force turned themselves over to Dačević during his custody in what was essentially a coup d'état on a municipal level. In addition to the stand-off with Dačević, his militia included forces of the Kornjača brothers from Čajniče, who helped blocked off the town from a garrison of the Yugoslav People's Army. Duško Kornjača threatened to kill all of the Muslims in Pljevlja unless Dačević was released. The militia's control over Pljevlja was strong enough that the Yugoslav People's Army garrison in Pljevlja, composed of only 73 soldiers, refused to confront them. On 7 August 1992 Momir Bulatović and Yugoslav President Dobrica Ćosić came to Pljevlja to negotiate with all parties involved. As a result, Bulatović along with Ćosić promised the Islamic community in Pljevlja that they would attempt to disarm the paramilitaries and add reinforcements of the Yugoslav People's Army to patrol the town. To satisfy the militia, Bulatović and Ćosić asked the local Muslims not to seek autonomy, although they had not done so over the course of the meeting. In spite of the resolution, Pljevlja's Muslim community suffered various incidents up to 1995, particularly in the village of Bukovica where 6 Muslim inhabitants were killed from 1992 onwards. Also, some Muslims from Bukovica have participated in war crimes against Serbs in villages around Čajniče.

=== Contemporary history ===
In 2008, some members of the municipal assembly of Pljevlja threatened a secession from Montenegro following the Montenegrin recognition of Kosovo. On 2 September 2020, glass was broken on the door of the Islamic Community of Pljevlja and a message was left saying "The black bird has taken off, Pljevlja will be Srebrenica.". It is proven to be set up by DPS to ignite religious hatred.

== Administration ==
=== Municipal Assembly ===
Party/Coalition	Seats	Local Gov't.
ZBCG (NSD–DNP)	12 / 34	Yes
DPS	8 / 34	No
DCG	4 / 34	Yes
PES	4 / 34	Yes
Pokret za Pljevlja	2 / 34	Yes
SNP	1 / 34	Yes
URA	1 / 34	No
SEP	1 / 34	No
BS	1 / 34	No

== Geography ==
The city lies at an altitude of 770 m (2,530 ft). The municipality borders those of Žabljak, Bijelo Polje and Mojkovac in Montenegro, as well as the republics of Serbia and Bosnia and Herzegovina. With a total area of 1,346 km^{2} (520 sq mi), it is the second largest municipality in Montenegro.

=== Climate ===
Climate data for Pljevlja (1991–2020 normals, extremes 1948–present)
Month	Jan	Feb	Mar	Apr	May	Jun	Jul	Aug	Sep	Oct	Nov	Dec	Year
Record high °C (°F)	16.4 (61.5)	22.7 (72.9)	25.0 (77.0)	29.3 (84.7)	33.1 (91.6)	34.7 (94.5)	37.3 (99.1)	38.7 (101.7)	36.3 (97.3)	29.5 (85.1)	25.6 (78.1)	17.3 (63.1)	38.7 (101.7)
Mean daily maximum °C (°F)	3.8 (38.8)	6.7 (44.1)	11.0 (51.8)	15.6 (60.1)	20.6 (69.1)	24.6 (76.3)	26.7 (80.1)	27.4 (81.3)	22.1 (71.8)	17.5 (63.5)	10.7 (51.3)	4.3 (39.7)	15.9 (60.6)
Mean daily minimum °C (°F)	−5.3 (22.5)	−4.2 (24.4)	−1.0 (30.2)	2.8 (37.0)	6.9 (44.4)	10.6 (51.1)	11.8 (53.2)	11.7 (53.1)	8.6 (47.5)	4.6 (40.3)	0.6 (33.1)	−3.6 (25.5)	3.6 (38.5)
Record low °C (°F)	−29.4 (−20.9)	−26.2 (−15.2)	−21 (−6)	−10.1 (13.8)	−3.8 (25.2)	−2.0 (28.4)	2.2 (36.0)	−0.2 (31.6)	−6.4 (20.5)	−7.6 (18.3)	−23.4 (−10.1)	−27 (−17)	−29.4 (−20.9)
Average precipitation mm (inches)	46.4 (1.83)	60.0 (2.36)	55.6 (2.19)	62.7 (2.47)	76.6 (3.02)	81.4 (3.20)	76.1 (3.00)	56.9 (2.24)	70.2 (2.76)	70.4 (2.77)	73.2 (2.88)	66.9 (2.63)	796.4 (31.35)
Average precipitation days (≥ 1 mm)	7.9	8.1	8.3	9.8	10.9	9.9	8.4	7.3	8.5	8.0	7.9	8.9	103.9
Average relative humidity (%)	83	78	73	70	71	74	72	72	76	78	81	85	76
Mean monthly sunshine hours	50.8	79.0	125.8	146.6	174.2	179.7	236.3	224.0	171.4	132.2	72.6	35.7	1,628.3
Source 1: National Oceanic and Atmospheric Administration
Source 2: Hydrological and Meteorological Service of Montenegro (humidity, sun 1961–1990)

== Demographics ==
Historical population
Year	Pop.	±%
1921	6,356	—
1931	5,900	−7.2%
1948	6,101	+3.4%
1953	7,202	+18.0%
1961	10,552	+46.5%
1971	14,511	+37.5%
1981	16,792	+15.7%
1991	20,887	+24.4%
2003	21,337	+2.2%
2011	19,136	−10.3%
2023	16,111	−15.8%
Population size may be affected by changes in administrative divisions.

Pljevlja is the administrative center of Pljevlja municipality, which has a population of 24,134. As of the last census data in 2023, town of Pljevlja itself has 16,111 citizens, and is the only town in the municipality with a population of over 1,000.

=== Ethnicity ===
The town's population in 2023 census was 59.94% Serbs, 21.18% Montenegrins, 10.04% Bosniaks, 3.82% ethnic Muslims. A total of 3.26% of the population have not declared their ethnicity.

=== Languages ===
Serbian, Bosnian, Montenegrin and Croatian are mutually intelligible as standard varieties of the Serbo-Croatian language. Serbian language speaks absolute majority of 66.61% and it‘s the most spoken language in the town. The second most spoken is Montenegrin (21.99%), and Bosnian speaks 5.66% of population. A total of 2.06% of the population have not declared their language.

=== Religion ===
Religion in Pljevlja (2023)
1. Eastern Orthodoxy (74.3%)
2. Islam (22.3%)
3. Other religions (3.45%)

In the past, a total of 26 mosques were built in the area of the city and surrounding settlements. There were 9 of them in Pljevlja, and today four of them exist and serve their purpose, while one is being rebuilt.

There are two Orthodox Christian churches and Monastery of the Holy Trinity.

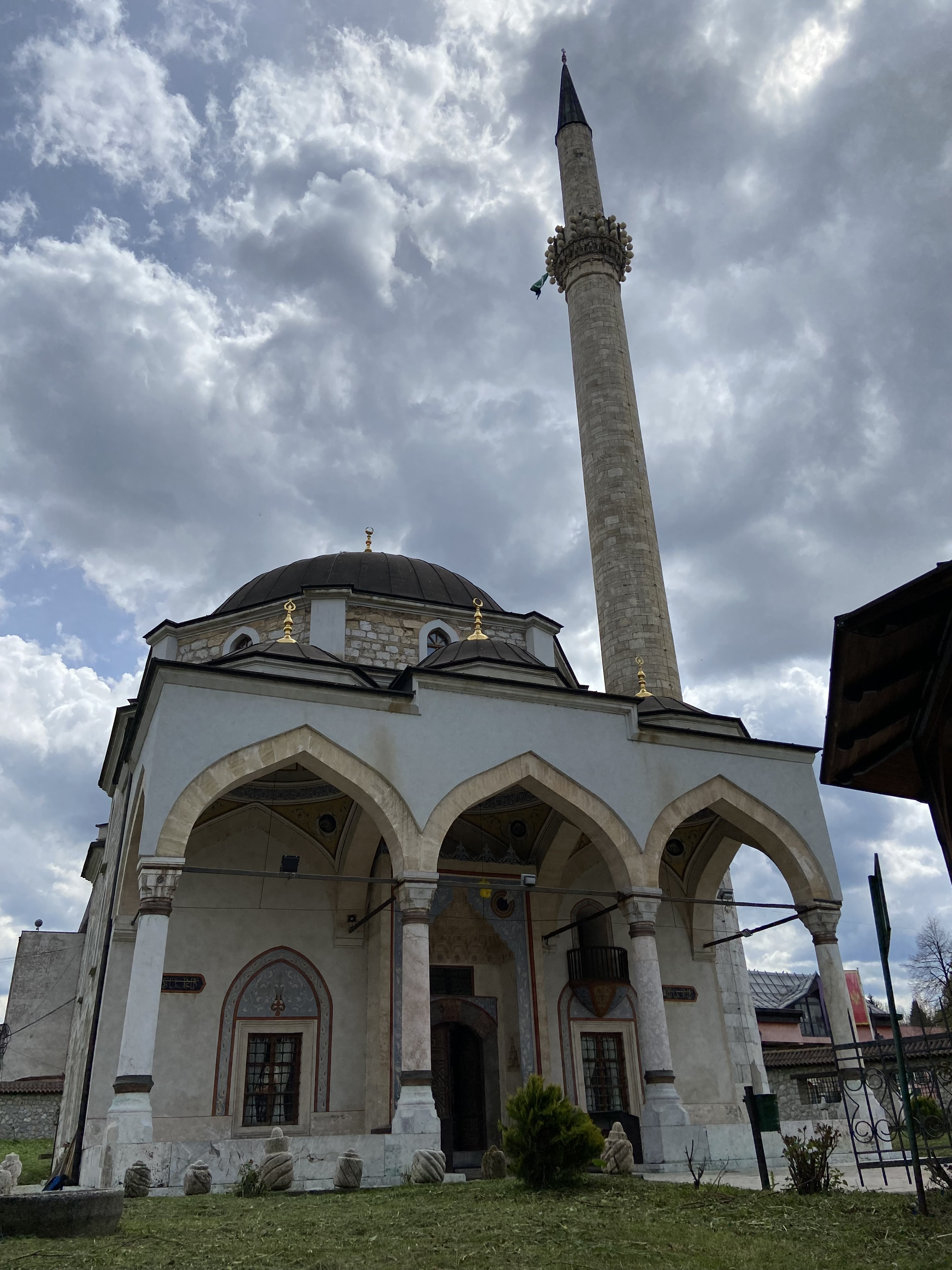
Husein Pasha‘s Mosque

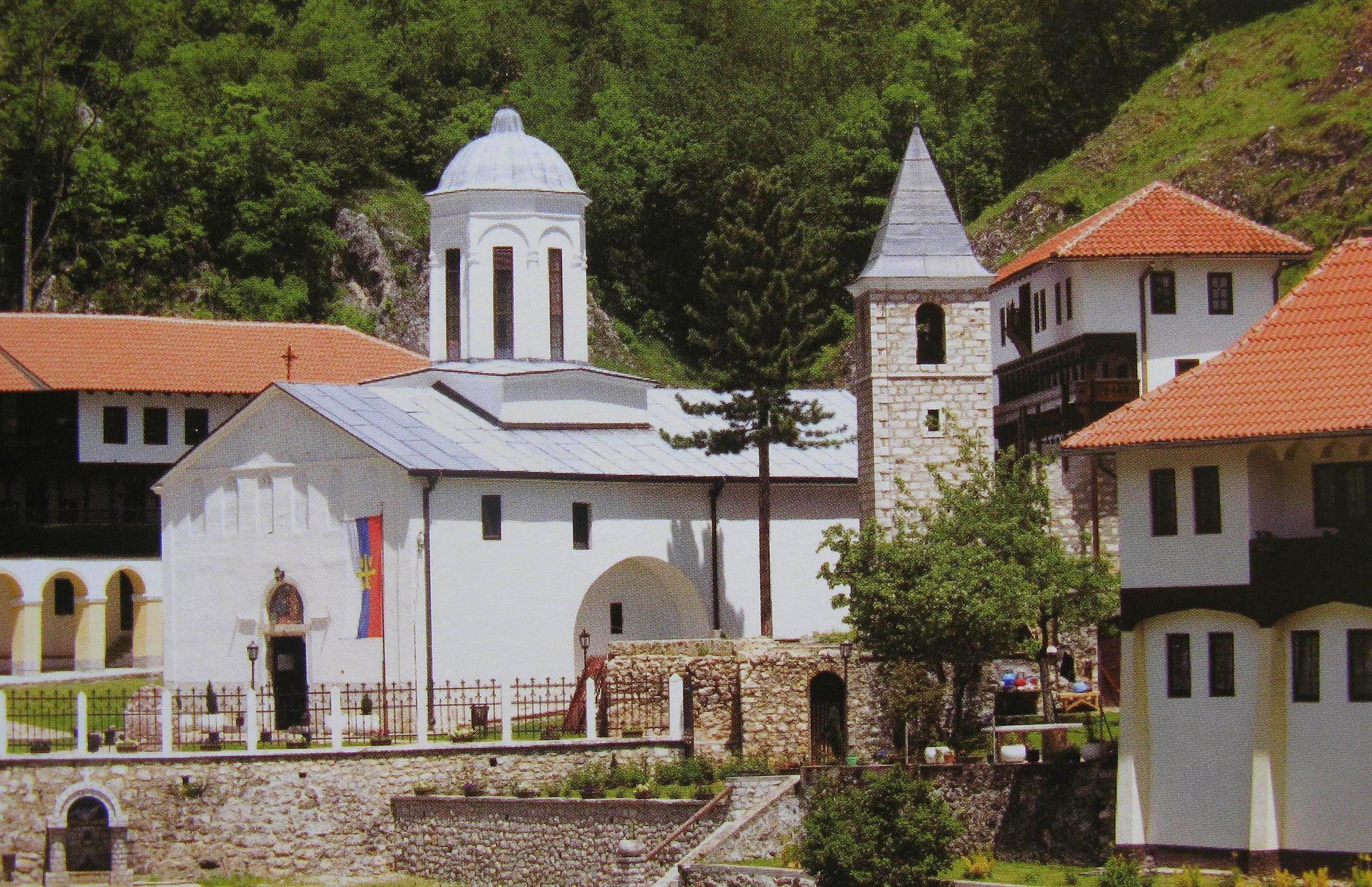
Monastery of the Holy Trinity

== Economy ==
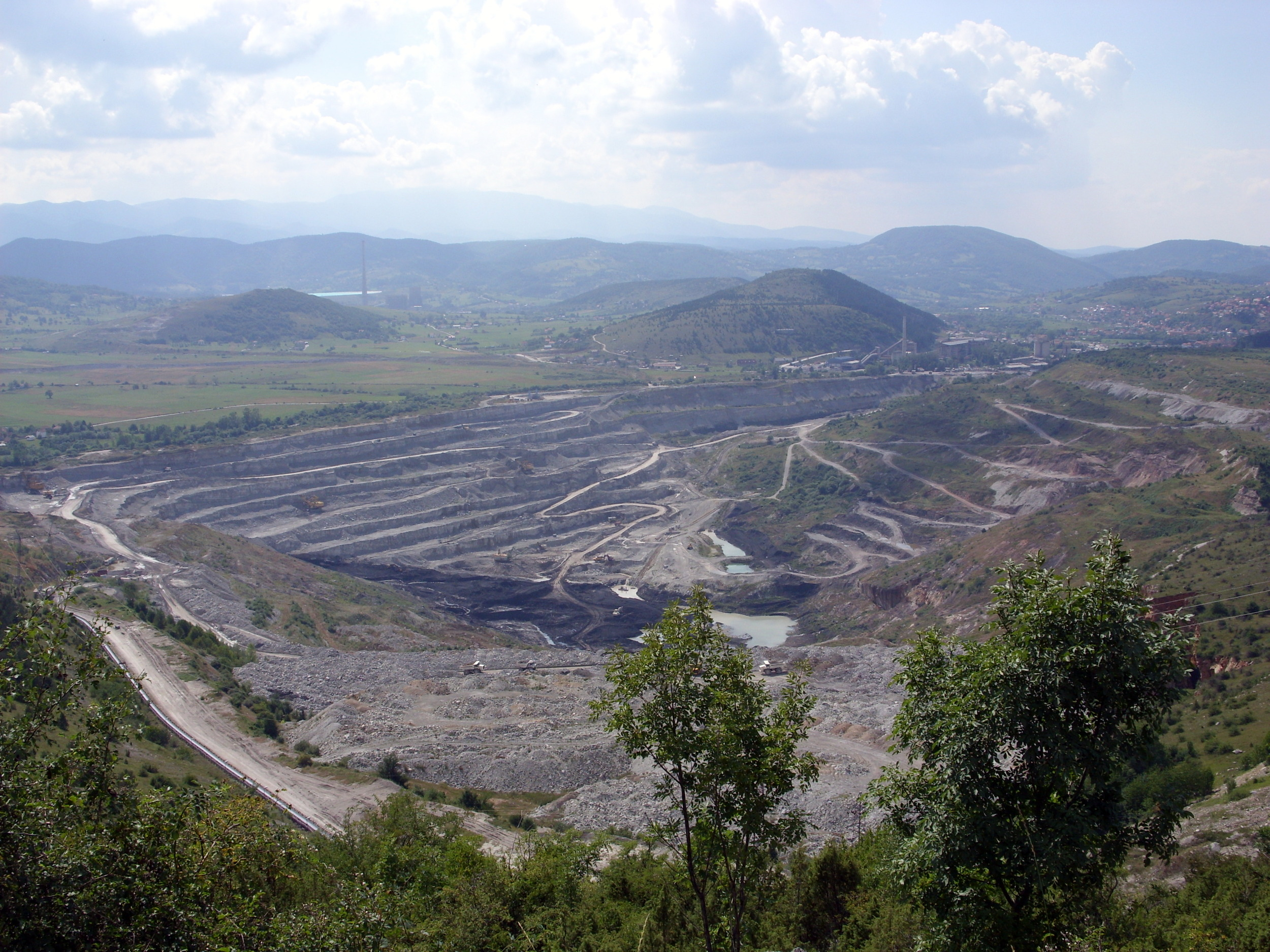
Coal mine near Pljevlja

Pljevlja is also one of the main economic engines of Montenegro. The only thermal power plant in Montenegro, which provides 45% of the electric power supply for Montenegro, is situated outside Pljevlja as well as the country's biggest Pljevlja coal mine which produces all of the coal in Montenegro. Zinc and lead can be found in Šuplja stijena mine. The richest municipality with forest in Montenegro is Pljevlja and its lumber industry. Agriculture is widespread in the whole municipality. Pljevaljski sir (Pljevlja's cheese, from Пљеваљски сир) is considered a delicacy.

== Transport ==
The main transit road connections are:

- to Podgorica and the rest of Montenegro
  across a bridge over Tara
- to Sarajevo in Bosnia and Herzegovina
- to Belgrade in Serbia

== Education ==
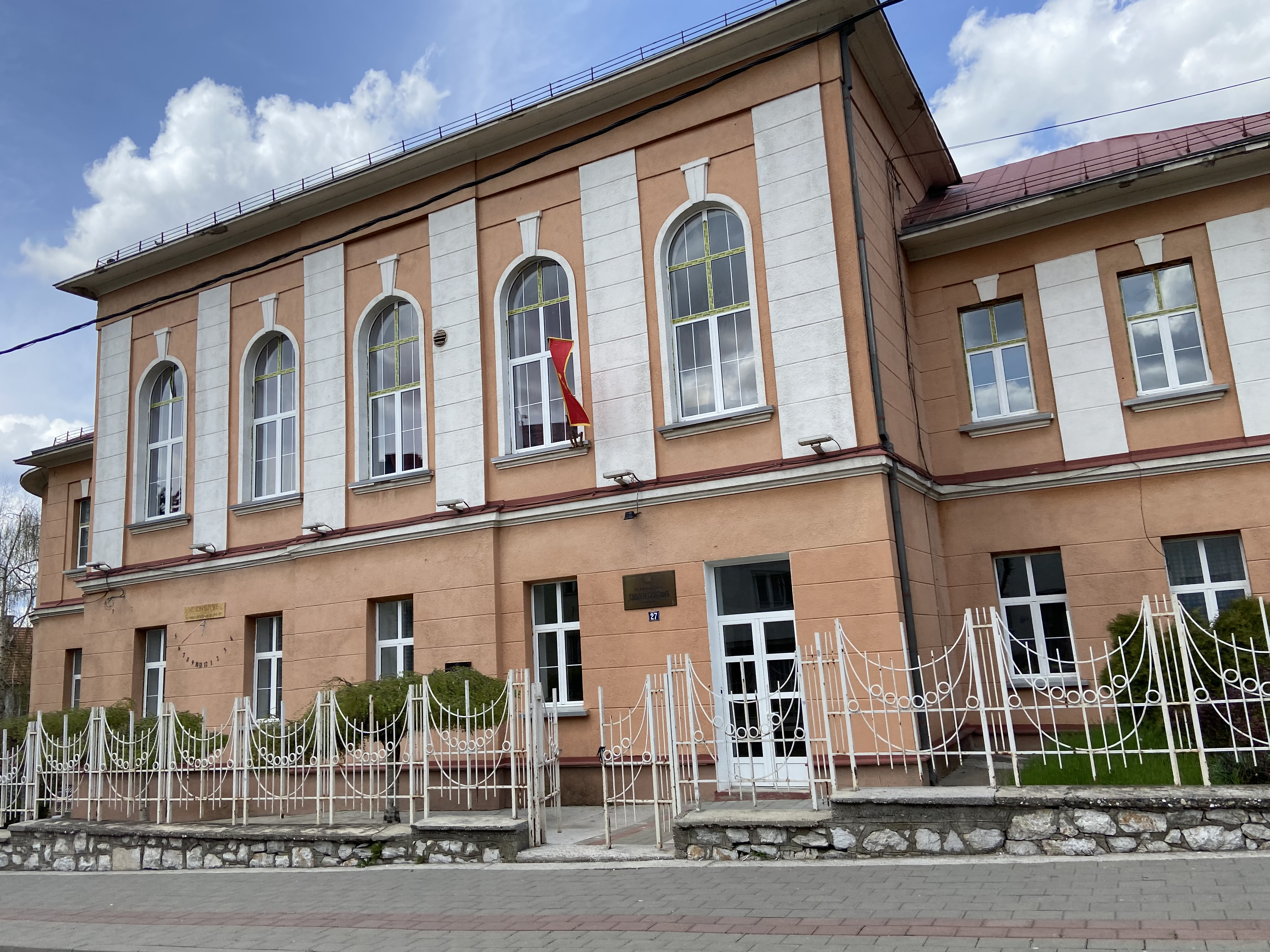
Tanasije Pejatović Gymnasium

The first educational life began at the Monastery of the Holy Trinity, as well as in Muslim schools madrasas and rushdiyes, and in the mosques themselves. The school in the monastery has been working continuously since the 16th century. Rushdiyes worked from the end of the 16th to the end of the 18th century. The first elementary school in Pljevlja started working in 1823.

A very important date in the history of education in Pljevlja is the opening of Tanasije Pejatović Gymnasium, on 17 September 1901. The first manager was Tanasije Pejatović (until then the substitute of Skopje Gymnasium) and the teacher - Stevan Samardžić (until then a teacher in Nova Varoš). Enrollment lasted until 5 November 1901. 44 male and 16 female students entered the first mixed high school class; within the gymnasium, an all-female Workers' School with 26 girls began its work. From 22 November other teachers also started to work for the department. The gymnasium, however, soon completely burned on 30 October 1904, and with it all its archives. The gymnasium was rebuilt and is still working today.

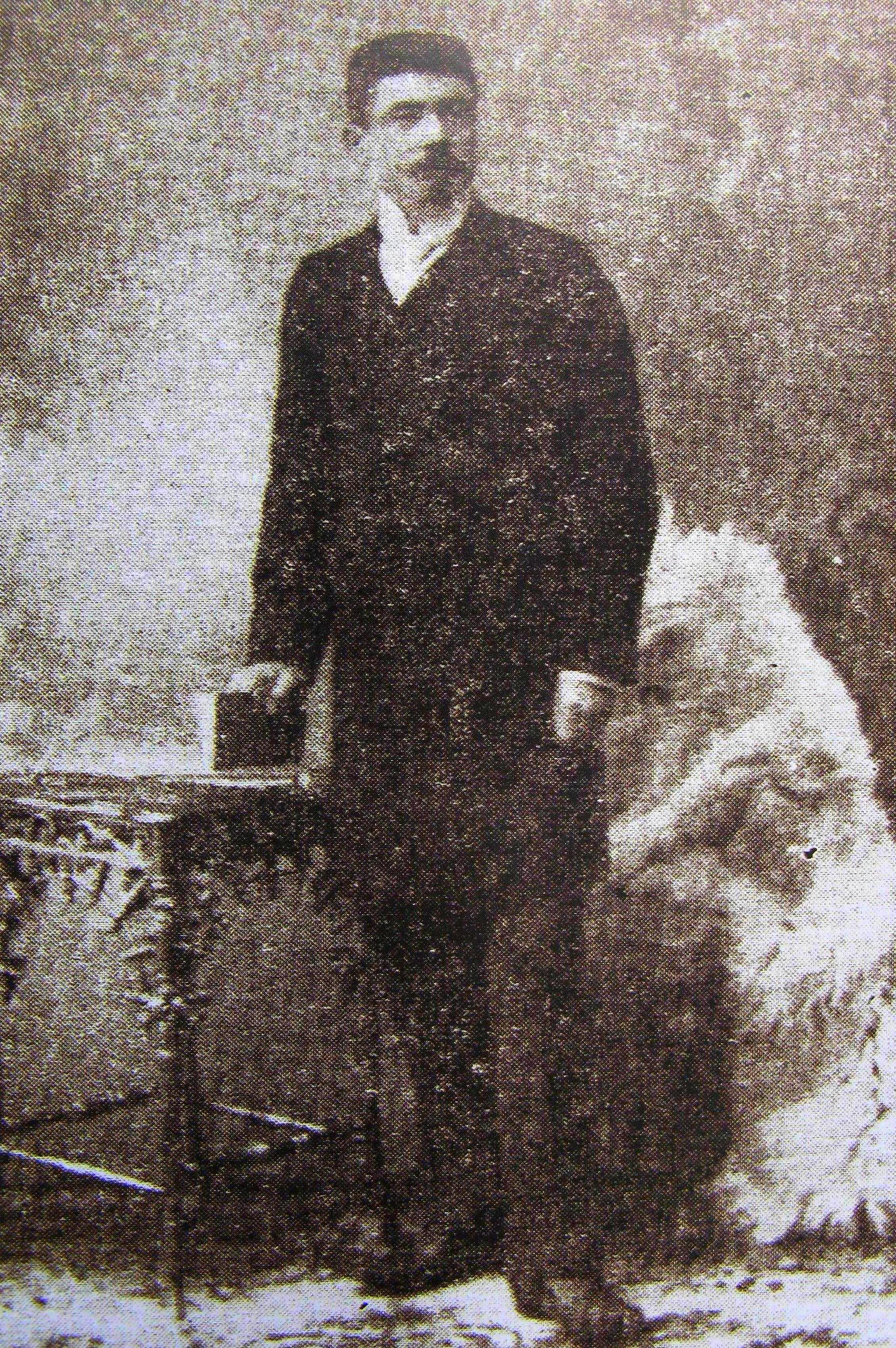
Prof. Tanasije Pejatović, first director of Gymnasium

There are three elementary and two highschools in Pljevlja.

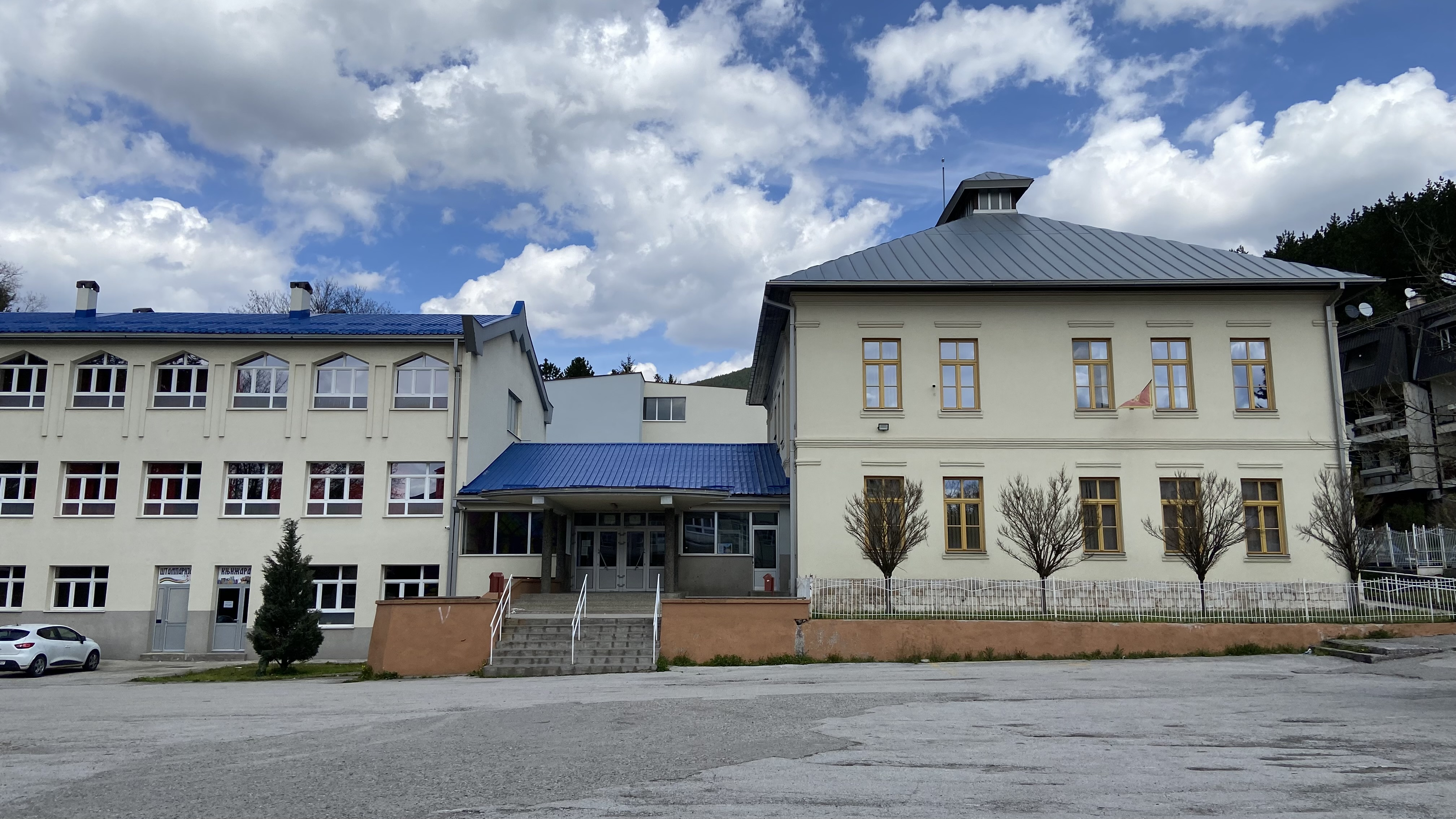
Secondary Vocational School

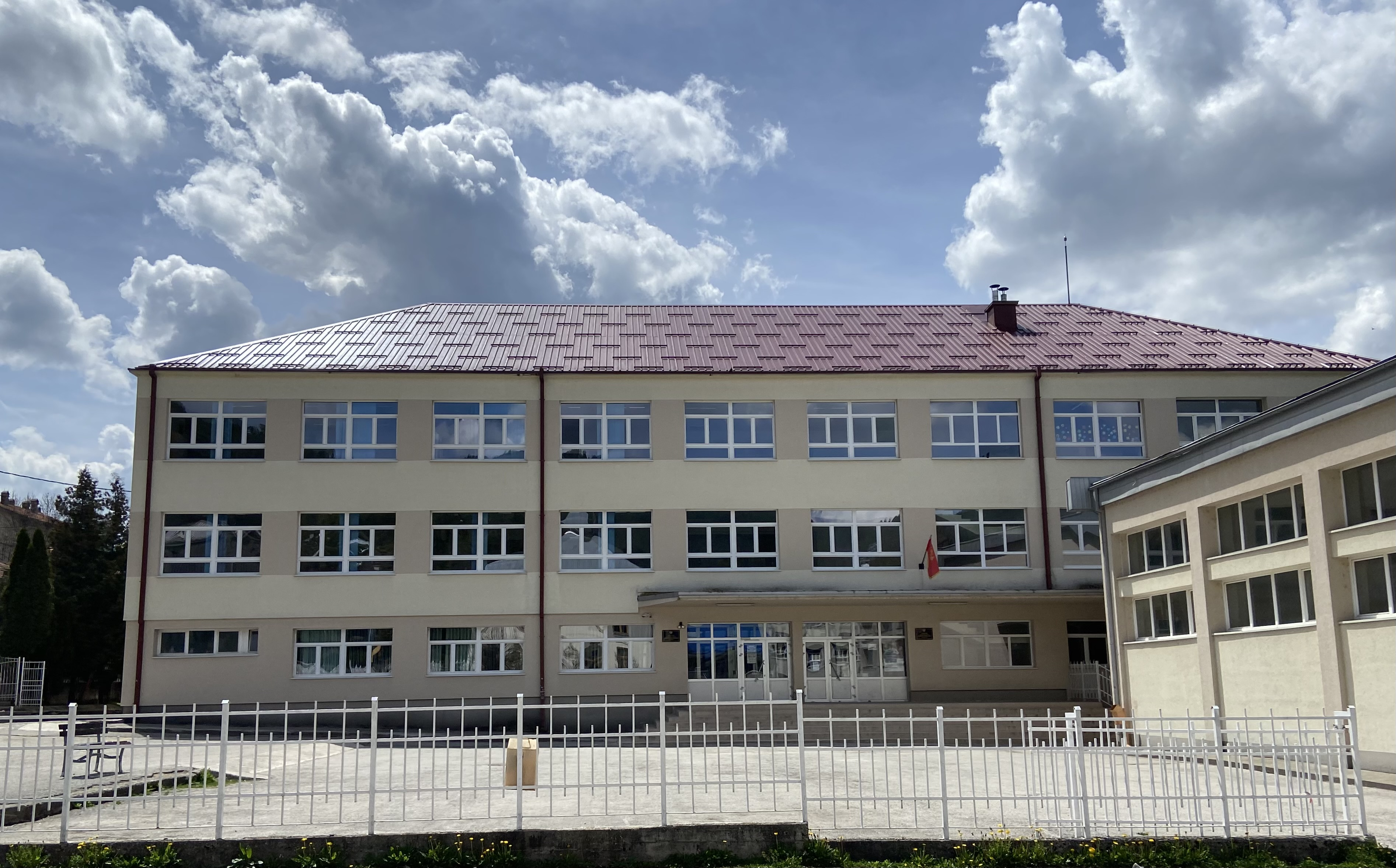
Ristan Pavlović elementary school

== Culture ==
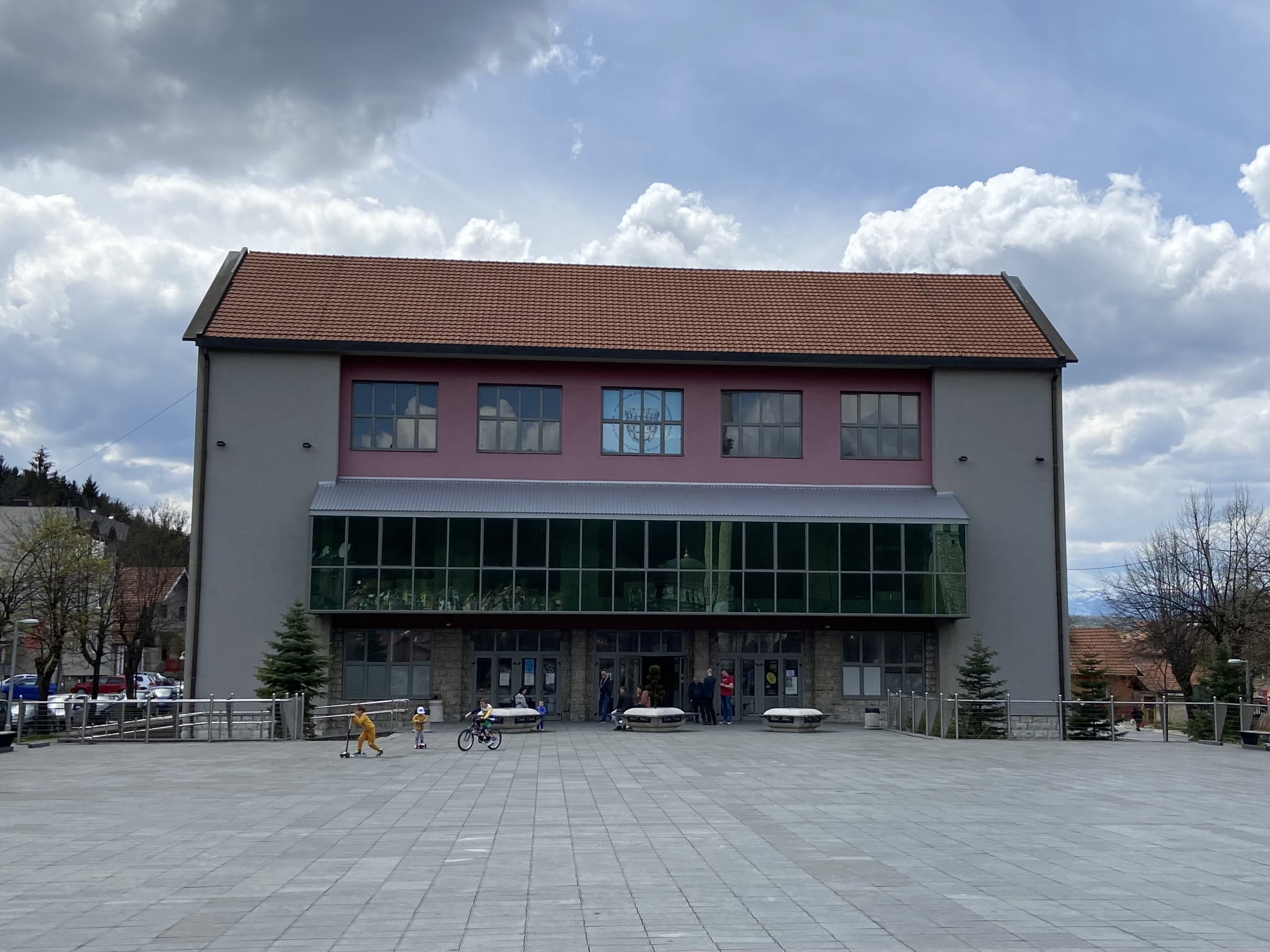
Culture Center Pljevlja

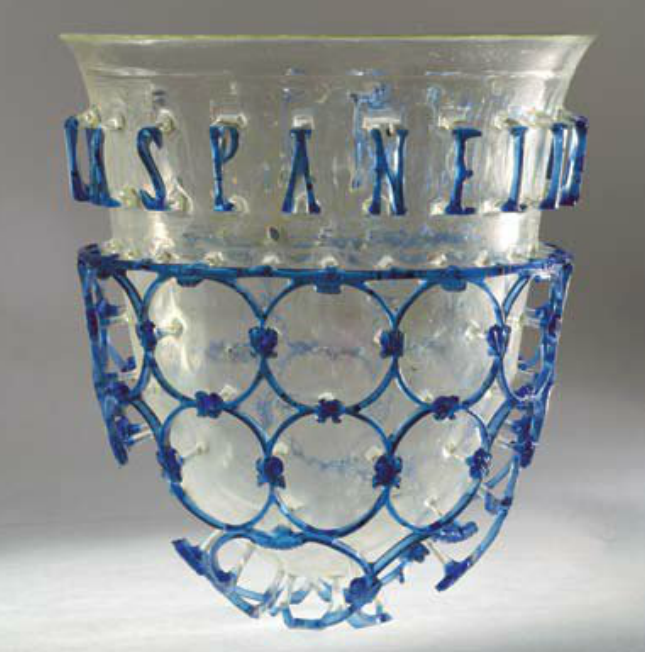
Pljevlja diatreta at Heritage Museum Pljevlja

Culture and education are all present throughout history of Pljevlja and its region. The first educational life, churches and monasteries, as well as in the mosques some time later. Monastery of the Holy Trinity is the richest treasury of cultural and spiritual life of the Orthodox Christians from the Middle Ages to the present times. The school in the Holy Trinity Monastery has been working continuously since the 16th century. In 1823, a primary school in Pljevlja started working. The school in Dovolja monastery worked since the 18th century. The very important date in the history of education in Pljevlja is the opening of the Pljevaljska Gymnasium in 1901. The Heritage Museum Pljevlja is a treasure trove of rich historical and cultural heritage of the city and region.

Main features of the town include:

- Heritage museum Pljevlja
- Husein-paša's Mosque and Sahat–kula
- Hadži Zekerijah's Mosque
- Rizvan Čauš Mosque
- Hadži Alija's Mosque
- Monastery of the Holy Trinity
- Church of St. Paraskeva
- Church of St. Elijah
- Municipium S, archaeological site
- Stećci (monoliths)
- Monument December 1
- Park Vodice
- Pljevlja Gymnasium
- Šećerović's House

== Sport ==
The main football team is FK Rudar Pljevlja, which play in the country's second tier. They share their Pod Golubinjom Stadium with lower league side FK Pljevlja 1997. The town's basketball team is KK Rudar Pljevlja and the handball team is RK Rudar Pljevlja.

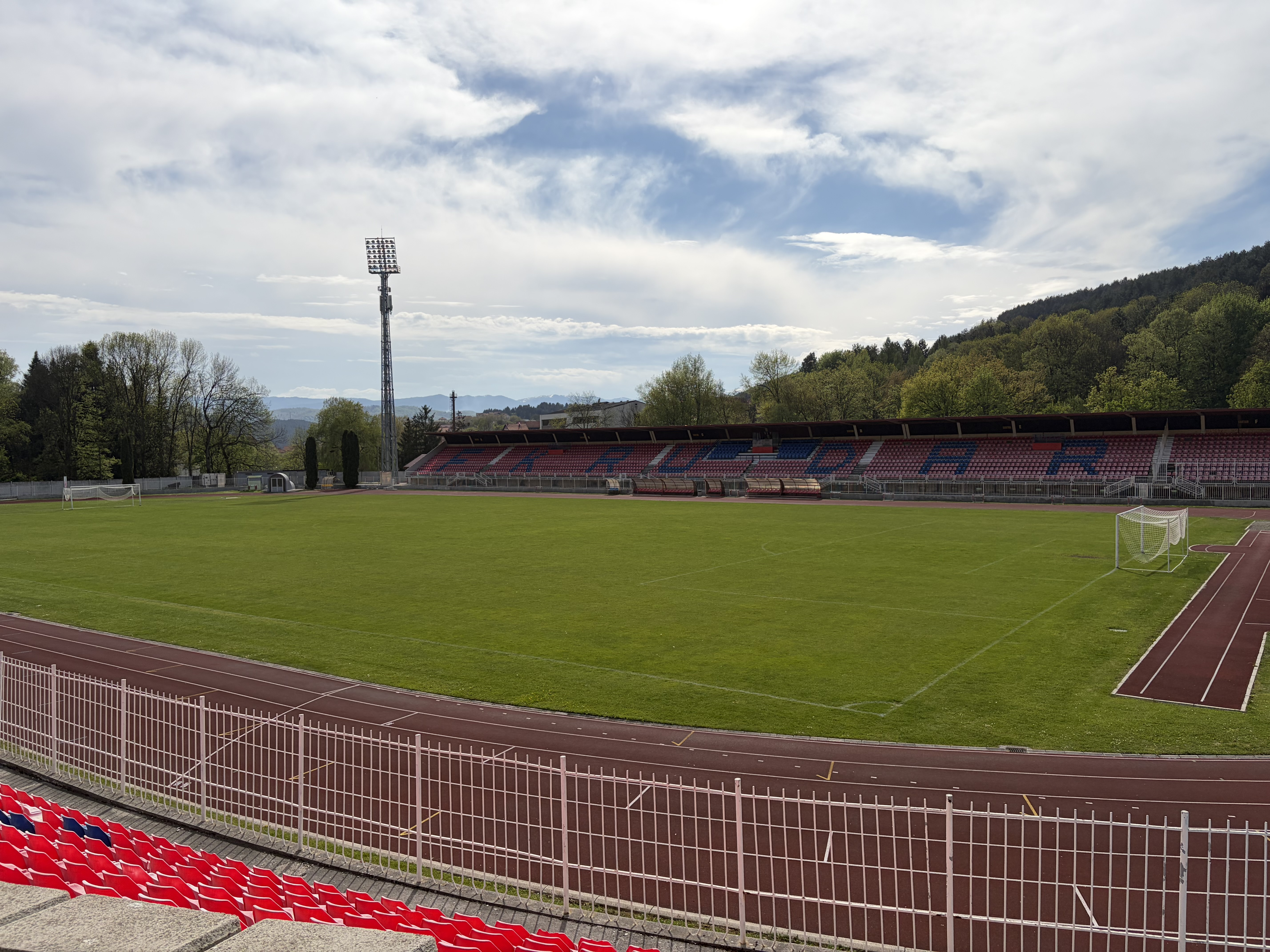
Pod Golubinjom Stadium

== International relations ==
=== Twin towns – sister cities ===
Pljevlja Municipality is twinned with:

- Babušnica, Serbia
- Gračanica, Bosnia and Herzegovina
- Marhanets, Ukraine
- Paraćin, Serbia
- Velenje, Slovenia
- Virovitica, Croatia
- Voždovac, Serbia

== Symbols ==
The coat of arms of Pljevlja has three lines near the bottom that represents the three rivers that run through the cities: Breznica, Ćehotina, and Vezičnica. First layer is clock tower from the center of Pljevlja and in the back are town-hall and the largest arc of bridge over Tara river which connects municipality of Pljevlja with the rest of the Montenegro. Colours are blue, white and red which represent the pan-Slavic tricolour system.

== Notable people ==
- Sinan Bey Boljanić (died in 1582) was the sanjak-bey of Herzegovina and of Bosnia
- Hüseyin Pasha Boljanić (died in 1594) was an Ottoman statesman and government official
- Gavrilo Trojičanin (c.1600-after 1651) is historiographer, a gifted scribe and the monk of the Monastery of the Holy Trinity of Pljevlja.
- Varnava Rosić (1880–1937), Serbian Patriarch
- Slobodan Šiljak (1881–1943) was a priest in the Serbian Orthodox Church
- Darinka Mirković Borović (18 January 1896 – 8 February 1979) was a Montenegrin nurse during World War I.
- Bogdan Tanjević (born 13 February 1947) is a Montenegrin professional basketball coach and former player.
- Derviš Hadžiosmanović (born 9 August 1958) is a Montenegrin football coach and former player.
- Izudin Bajrović (born 9 February 1963) is a Bosnian theater, film and television actor.
- Vojo Ćalov (born 29 July 1963) is a Montenegrin football manager and former player.
- Žarko Paspalj (born 27 March 1966) is a retired professional basketball player and sports administrator.
- Nebojša Medojević (Born 13 June 1966) is a Montenegrin politician.
- Sanja Đorđević (born 1969) is a turbo-folk singer
- Predrag Bošković (born 12 March 1972) is a Montenegrin politician.
- Damir Čakar (born 28 June 1973) is a Montenegrin former professional footballer.
- Radosav Bulić (born 2 January 1977) is a Montenegrin former football midfielder.
- Goga Sekulić (born 27 February 1977) is a turbo-folk singer.
- Slavko Vraneš (born 30 January 1983) is a Montenegrin former professional basketball player.
- Danijel Živković (born 15 August 1987) is a Montenegrin politician.
- Milojko Spajić (born 24 September 1987) is a Montenegrin politician.
- Mijuško Bojović (born 9 August 1988) is a Montenegrin footballer.
- Žarko Tomašević (born 22 February 1990) is a Montenegrin footballer.
- Nemanja Grbović (born 26 April 1990) is a Montenegrin handball player.
