= Monastery of the Holy Trinity of Pljevlja =

Serbian Orthodox monastery in Pljevlja, Montenegro

Coordinates: 43.3699°N 19.3584°E

Holy Trinity Monastery
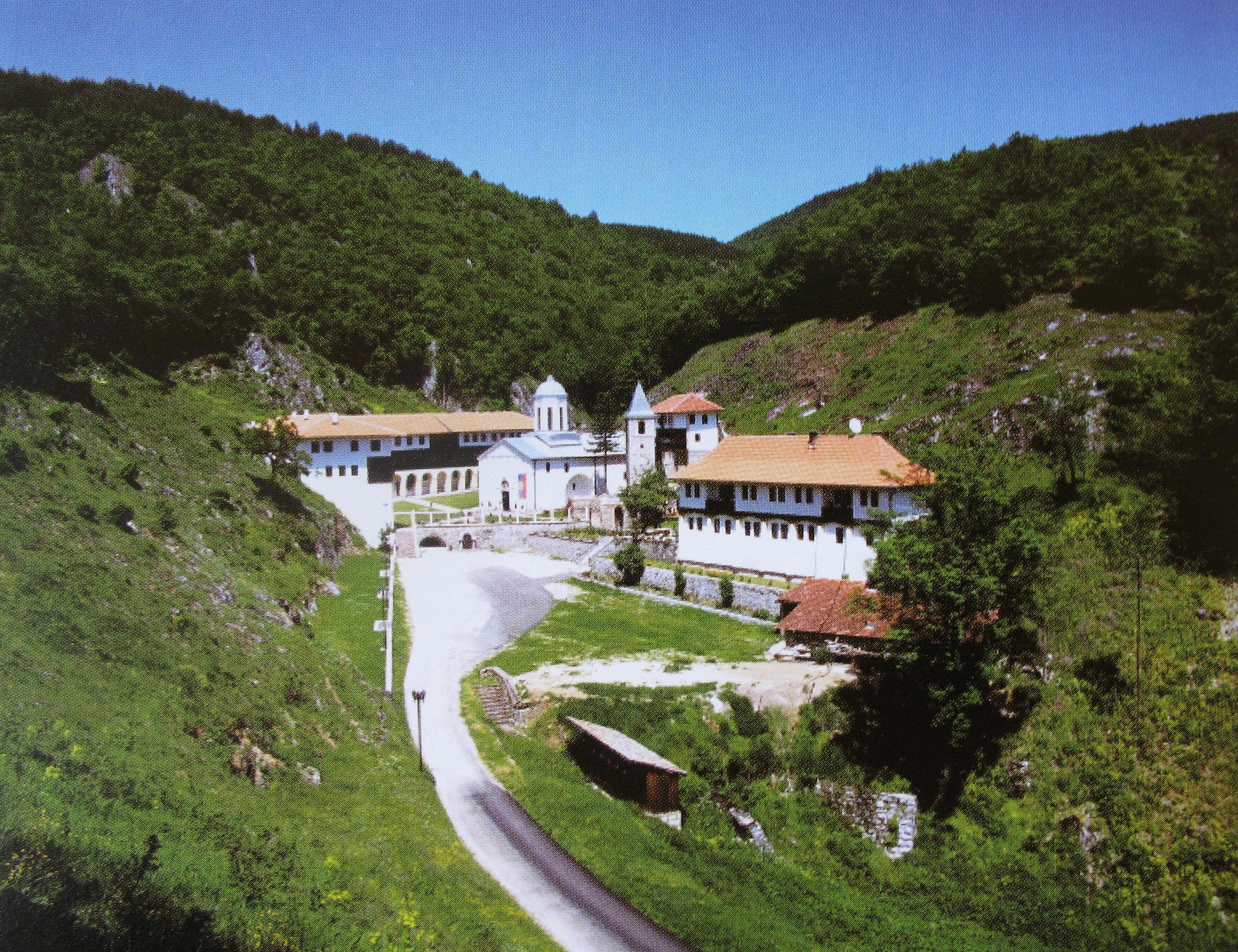
- Holy Trinity Monastery, Pljevlja

Religion
- Affiliation: Orthodox
- Region: Montenegro

Location
- Location: Pljevlja
- Interactive map of Holy Trinity Monastery
- Administration: Diocese of Mileseva

Architecture
- Established: fifteenth century

The Holy Trinity Monastery of Pljevlja (Serbian: Манастир Света Тројица Пљеваљска, romanized: Manastir Sveta Trojica Pljevaljska) is a medieval Serbian Orthodox monastery complex (lavra) in Pljevlja, Montenegro. It is located about 60 kilometres (37 mi) north of Durmitor, and 39 kilometres (24 mi) from Đurđevića Tara Bridge.

== History ==
It is not known exactly when the monastery was founded. Today's see of the Eparchy of Mileševa was established before the 1465 Ottoman conquest of the city. Since the Ottoman law forbade the building of new churches, but permitted the rebuilding of those which had existed at the time of Mehmed the Conqueror, it is certain that a church had existed on the site of the present monastic church, before the Ottoman conquest and probably made of wood. The first reference to Holy Trinity Monastery in Pljevlja dates from 1573, when Sava, a monk from the monastery, copied a manuscript. At that time the monastery was managed by abbot Visarion, who took great pains to improve its economic position. Moreover, an inscription published by Sava Kosanović in 1871 shows that it was precisely this abbot who restored the monastery. This testimony is corroborated by the donor's portrait of Visarion on the south wall of the nave. On 1 December 1941, during the Battle of Pljevlja the Communist forces killed Serafim Džarić, an archimandrite of the Monastery of the Holy Trinity of Pljevlja, as a direct consequence of the order of Partisan headquarters to start with "fierce struggle against spies and fifth column" after the capture of the town.

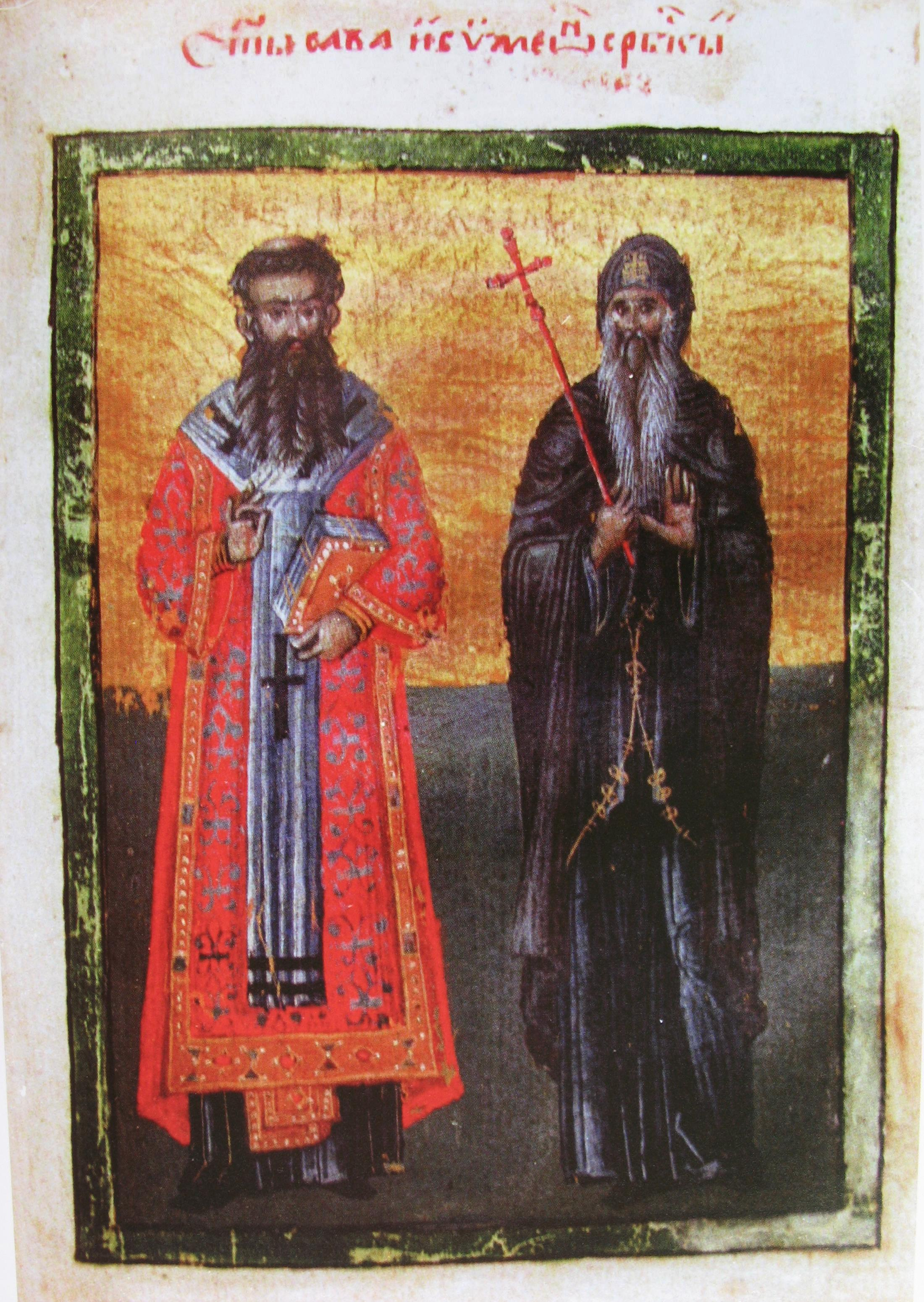
St. Sava and his father St. Simeon (1643).

== Architecture ==
The architecture of Holy Trinity Monastery differs from that of other monasteries in the region. The architecture of the oldest part of the monastery is very unusual, in that it is almost square, with a large apse. The nave is divided by four pillars - two on the south side and two on the north - into three sections: a wide central part and two narrow side-aisles. The central part of the nave is covered by a longitudinal barrel vault supported by the pillars, while the transverse vaults of the lower side-aisles are also semicircular and are set at right angle to the central part of the nave. For other architectural features, parallels can be found in the architecture of the period.

== Treasure ==
Holy Trinity Monastery is the richest treasury of the cultural and spiritual life of the Orthodox Serbs from the Middle Ages to the present times. During a period of time in the history, traditional costumes displayed in the ethnological department of the Heritage Museum Pljevlja were carefully preserved in the monastery.

== Goldsmith's work ==
Among the church vessels acquired during the 16th century is a pyx from 1576 and a Holy Chalice from 1578. The pyx is in the form of a single-naved church with three cupolas. The chalice is very similar to contemporary Italian examples: it is predominantly Gothic. The differing traditions are skilfully harmonized and this can be classed among the finest products of sixteenth century Serbian goldsmith's work, because of its precise craftmanship and subtle proportions.

== Wall paintings ==
The iconographical repertory of Holy Trinity Monastery, Pljevlja, is interesting because of the choice of the figures of saints and compositions. The accounts given by Rudolf Hilferding and Sava Kosanovic show that the nave and the sanctuary were decorated in 1595 by Father Strahinja of Budmilje.

== Illuminated manuscripts ==
The scriptorium of the monastery was especially well known in the middle of the 16th and 17th centuries. The credit for this should mainly be given to the Monk Gavrilo. Little has been discovered about his life. Many of the books copied by him are still in the monastery, but some very precious ones are to be found abroad, in Vienna, Saint Petersburg and Prague. The miniatures in Gavrilo's Psalter were the work of Jovan Kyr Kozma, considered one of the greatest Serb painters of the 17th century.

== Icons ==
There are also many icons. One of them represents the Nativity, dated to the 1570s and attributed to the prominent Serbian icon painter Zograf Longin of Peć, who also painted frescoes at Visoki Dečani. Another icon, the Baptism of Christ, is also attributed to him. The five icons painted in 1645/1646 and preserved in the monastic treasury were painted in the monastery. The also includes Andrija Raičević icons, icons of the Cretan School and Russian icons as well as many by unknown artists. Those by the Cretan School are very fine, especially an icon of the Deesis with saints and Saint George and the Dragon.

== See also ==
- List of Serbian Orthodox monasteries

=== Bibliography ===
- Monastery of the Holy Trinity of Pljevlja| Author: prof. Sreten Petkovic(Serbian Cyrillic:Манастир Светa Тројицa у Пљевљима|Аутор проф.Сретен Петковић) Cataloguing and publications by Municipality Pljevlja | Heritage Museum Pljevlja - 2008 (Serbian Cyrillic:Каталогизација и публикацијa -Општинa Пљевља|Завичајни музеј Пљевља - 2008)
- History of Pljevlja Municipality - 2009 ( Serbian : Историја Пљевља - 2009 )Editor prof. Slavenko Terzic - CIP Cataloguing in Publication of the Central National Library of Montenegro, Cetinje(Serbian Cyrillic: Уредник проф. Славенкo Терзић -ЦИП каталогизација у публикацији Централне народне библиотеке Црнe Горe,Цетиње).
