= Šiljak =

Šiljak (pronounced [ʃǐːʎak]; Serbian Cyrillic: Шиљак) is a South-Slavic toponym and Bosnian/Serbian surname. The highest peak of Rtanj is Šiljak (1,565 m). Notable people with the surname include:

- Dragoslav D. Šiljak
- Slobodan Šiljak
- Ermin Šiljak

== See also ==
- Šiljakovac, suburban settlement of Belgrade
