= Vojo Ćalov =

Montenegrin footballer and manager

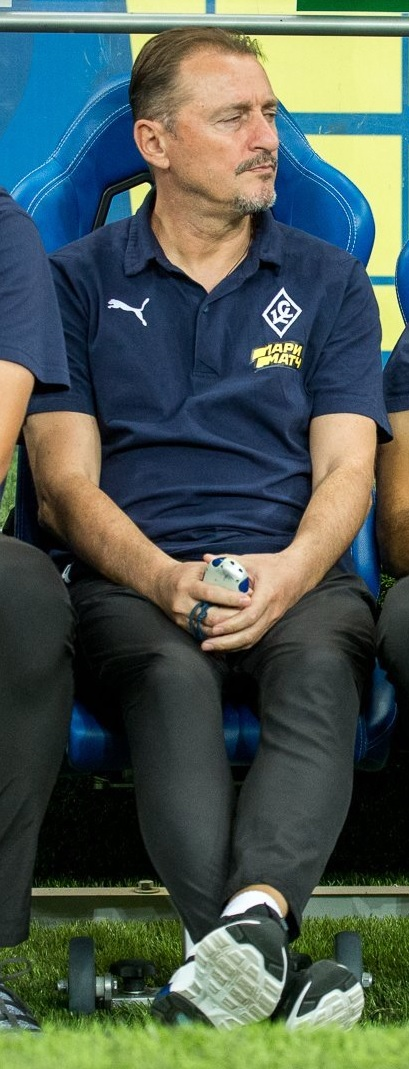
- Ćalov coaching Krylia Sovetov Samara in 2019

Personal information
- Full name: Vojo Ćalov
- Date of birth: 29 July 1963 (age 63)
- Place of birth: Pljevlja, SFR Yugoslavia
- Height: 1.84 m (6 ft 1/2 in)
- Position: Midfielder

Senior career*
Years	Team	Apps	(Gls)
1983–1985	OFK Titograd	31	(0)
1985–1987	Bor	23	(0)
1987–1992	Budućnost Titograd	70	(0)

Managerial career
- 2005: Hajduk Beograd
- 2008: Amkar Perm (a'sst)
- 2009: FC Moscow (a'sst)
- 2013–2014: Rostov (a'sst)
- 2014: Lokomotiv Moscow (a'sst)
- 2015–2017: Red Star Belgrade (a'sst)
- 2017–2018: Arsenal Tula (a'sst)
- 2018–2020: Krylia Sovetov Samara (a'sst)
- * Club domestic league appearances and goals

Vojo Ćalov (Serbian Cyrillic: Војо Ћалов, born 29 July 1963) is a Montenegrin football manager and former player.

== Playing career ==
=== Club ===
Born in Pljevlja, SR Montenegro, back then still within Yugoslavia, Ćalov started playing at third-level side OFK Titograd. In 1984 they achieved promotion, and Ćalov played with OFK Titograd in the 1984–85 Yugoslav Second League. Next season he moved to a Serbian side FK Bor playing same level, however at the end of the season they ended-up relegated. Ćalov stayed another season with Bor, scoring one goal in their 1986/87 third league campaign. That year Ćalov returned to Montenegro and signed with what was by then the best positioned Montenegrin club in the Yugoslav league system, FK Budućnost Podgorica, known till 1991 as FK Budućnost Titograd. Between 1987 and 1992, Ćalov made 70 games in the Yugoslav First League with Budućnost.

== Managerial career ==
Ćalov had his coaching career closely linked to the one of his compatriot Miodrag Božović, being his right-hand as assistant manager while Božović coached several clubs in Russia, first FC Amkar Perm in 2008, followed by FC Moscow in 2009, then between July 15, 2013 and September 26, 2014, FC Rostov, from where he left to FC Lokomotiv Moscow. Then, in July 2015, he followed Božović again, this time moving to Serbia to become assistantsp manager at Red Star Belgrade.
