= Pljevlja Gymnasium =

- 1901

Location
- Pljevlja, Montenegro, Pljevlja Municipality; Montenegro; 43.356667°N 19.358333°E

Information
- Type: Charter school State school Gymnasium; Latin; Russian; English; French; University preparatory school
- Established: November 18, 1901
- Founder: Serbian Orthodox Church in Pljevlja
- Status: Functional
- Affiliation: Secular

The Pljevlja Gymnasium (Serbian: Пљеваљска гимназија / Pljevaljska gimnazija) is a secondary school in Pljevlja. Since its founding the gymnasium bears the name of its first principal and professor of history: "Tanasije Pejatović Gymnasium" (Гимназија Танасије Пејатовић/Gimnazija Tanasije Pejatović )

It was established by the Metropolitanate of Karlovci on November 18, 1901. Pljevlja Gymnasium was the first gymnasium in the newly formed Province of Pljevlja founded at Berlin Congress, placed under dual occupation and administered by Austro Hungarians and Ottoman Empire. Following the treaty items of Berlin Congress education in Pljevlja Gymnasium included also Christian youth from Prijepolje and Priboj, the regions within the Province of Pljevlja, and Christian youth from a part of the city of Pljevlja administered by the Austro-Hungarian administration where the school building was located. The teaching staff were Serbs from different places of the region under the Austro Hungarian occupation, as well many professors were sent from Kingdom of Serbia and Principality of Montenegro. Among them was Vasa Stajić and the famous painters Nadezda Petrovic and Milenko Atanacković all of them, at that time, residents with documents of Austria-Hungary.

== Background ==
The first educational life until beginning of modern education, was organized in Churches and monasteries. The Holy Trinity Monastery (Pljevlja) became of great significance of cultural and spiritual life for the Orthodox Serbs in the Middle Ages.School in the monastery of St. Trinity has been working continuously since 16th century. It continues to be of cultural importance. The school in the Holy Trinity Monastery has been in service since the 16th century. The school in the nearby Dovolja monastery has been functional since the 18th century. The primary school system was established in this region in 1823.

== History ==
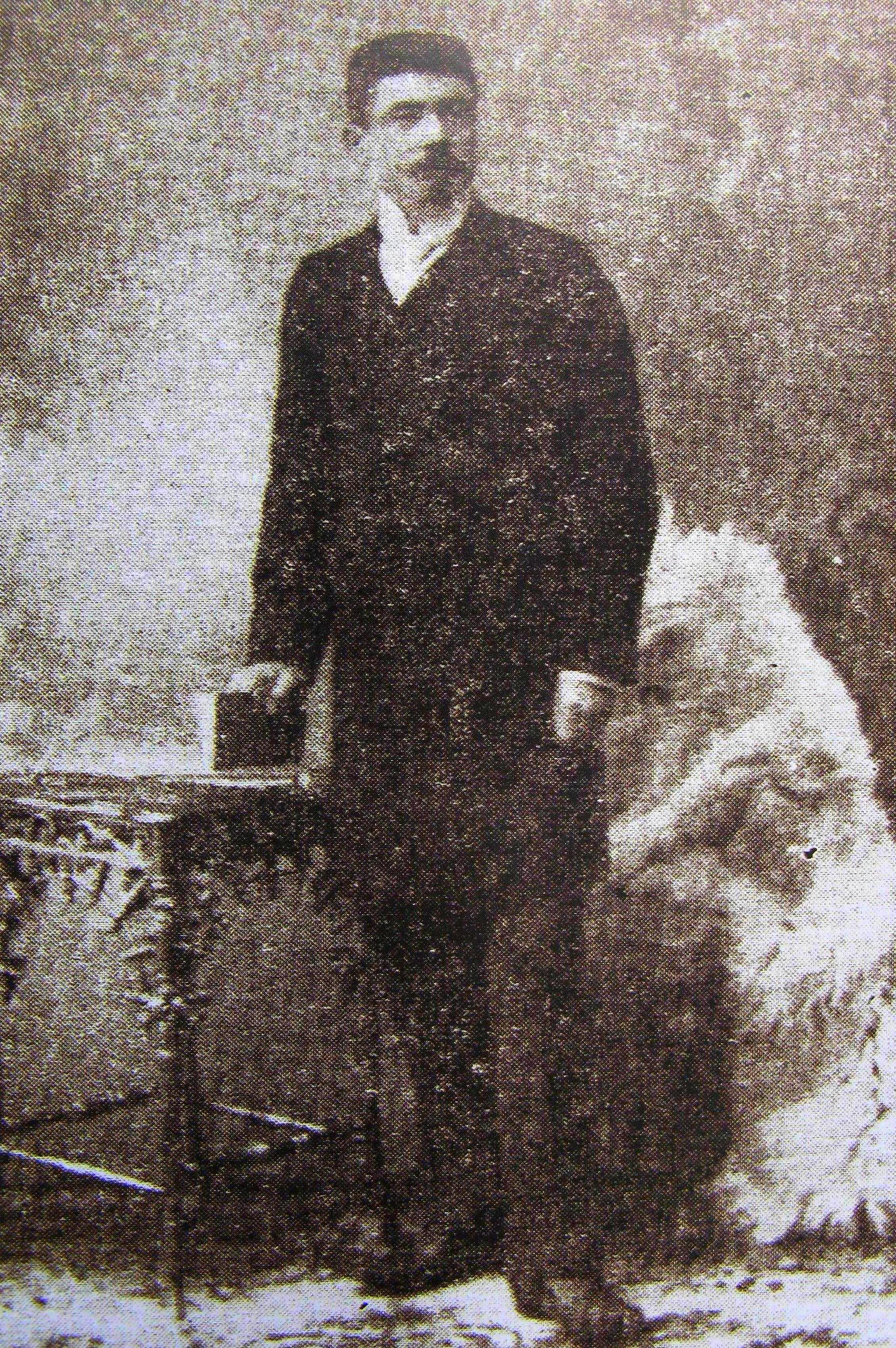
Prof. Tanasije Pejatović, first director.

The Pljevlja Gymnasium was established in 1901 as the Serb Gymnasium (Srpska gimnazija/Српска ) with the financial support of the Ministry of Foreign Affairs of the then Kingdom of Serbia. The gymnasium's first principal was Tanasije Pejatović and Jovan Cvijić as supervisor.Instruction was given in Serbian. Subjects included social sciences and natural sciences, history, social geography, physical geography, anthropology and ethnography.

== Gymnasium in Kingdom of Montenegro ==
After the final liberation of the city during the First Balkan War in October 1912 by Treaty of Bucharest (1913) the territory and school become part of the Kingdom of Montenegro

== Gymnasium in Kingdom of Yugoslavia ==
In Kingdom of Yugoslavia on March 29, 1919, falling under the jurisdiction of the Zeta Banovina province in 1929. In 1944 studies resumed in the gymnasium. On 8 April 1945 it was organized into the Ministry of Education of PR Montenegro. In 1968, the gymnasium was renamed to Tanasije Pejatović Gymnasium.

In 1977, as part of the Stipe Šuvar statewide education reform in Socialist Yugoslavia, the gymnasium was merged into the Vocational education stream, removing many of its advantages over other schools. The principals of all gymnasiums in SR Serbia and SR Montenegro lobbied the scientific and policy-making community to re-establish their special status, rights, funding, and curriculum. As a result, in 1991 the school was officially re-established as a classical gymnasium.

== Honours ==
- Order of Merit with the Golden Star, by Presidency of SFR Yugoslavia.
- Oktoih Award by Socialist Republic of Montenegro.

== Literature ==
- Васовић, Милорад (2009). Историја Пљеваља. ISBN 978-9940-512-03-3.

=== Sources ===
- Serbian High School in Pljevlja cultural property of national significance
