= Heritage Museum Pljevlja =

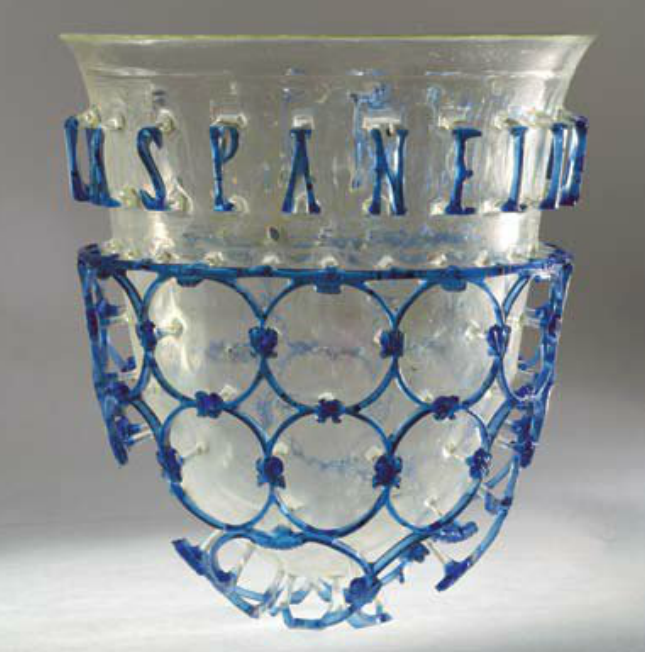
- Pljevlja Diatreta
- Established: 1952
- Location: Pljevlja, Montenegro
- Coordinates: 43.36°N 19.36°E
- Collection size: more than 5,000 objects
- Director: Branko Banović
- Website: Museum website

The Heritage Museum Pljevlja (Serbian: ЈУ Завичајни Музеј Пљевља) is a museum in Pljevlja, Montenegro. The museum collection begins with works of prehistoric art from the 1st–4th centuries BC. One of the largest museums in Montenegro, it was founded in 1952. Its holdings amount to over 5,000 items, of which only a small number are on permanent display, including the Pljevlja diatreta or cage cup.

== Pljevlja diatreta ==
The Pljevlja diatreta is a well-preserved cage cup from the 4th century AD. It is made of transparent colourless glass with a cobalt blue web. The inscription on it is of the same colour: VIVAS PANELLENI BONA. The cup is also a very rare example of a complete Roman cage cup, or diatretum. It comes from a famous workshop in Cologne. The cup is not on display, but can be looked at a scheduled appointment with the museum administration.

== Fibula (brooch) gallery ==
A cross-shaped fibula made of bronze, a silver heart-shaped pendant, a silver jointed fibula(1st – 2nd century), a silver ring with a red rock (2nd– th century).

Silver necklace 1st–2nd century BC.

Fibula 1st–2nd century BC.

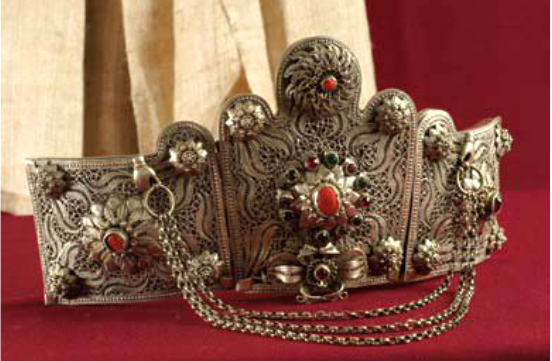
The belt called a Chemer part of the Montenegrin woman's folk costume .

== Bibliography ==
- History of Pljevlja, 2009, Heritage Museum Pljevlja, pp. 615–621. Prof. Slavenko Terzic (ed.), CIP Cataloguing in Publication of the Central NationalLibrary of Montenegro, Cetinje.
