= Slobodan Šiljak =

Slobodan Šiljak (1881 in Pljevlja – December 5, 1943 in Pljevlja) was a Montenegrin priest in the Serbian Orthodox Church who was sainted by the church in 2005.

Šiljak studied theology in Prizren. He served as a military chaplain in the Balkan Wars. Šiljak was executed by a local Yugoslav Partisan unit during World War II on December 5, 1943 as an "enemy of the people". He was proclaimed a saint by the Serbian Orthodox Church in May 2005 in Bosnia and Herzegovina's Žitomislić Monastery despite protests by groups from Pljevlja that he was a war criminal. Milosava Strunjaš has come forward claiming that Šiljak was responsible for the death of her father Rajko Cerović.
