= List of medieval Serbian manuscripts =

The List of Medieval Serbian manuscripts (Serbian: Средњовековни српски рукописи, Srednjovekovni srpski rukopisi) belonging to a corpus of Medieval Serbian literature, including Serbian Orthodox codices, written in vernacular Serbian (Folk language, Slavic), Old Church Slavonic, using Serbian Cyrillic, and/or Glagolitic scripts. Containing important works attributed to Serbia or Serbs. The majority of works are theological, with a few biographies and constitutions.

The number of early Serbian manuscripts, that is, those made before the end of the 14th century, is estimated at 800–1,000. The number of Serbian manuscripts dating between the 12th and 17th centuries that are located outside Serbia is estimated at 4,000–5,000. The largest number of the manuscripts are located in Europe. The largest and most important collection is housed at the Hilandar on Mount Athos. Next, the second largest collection is most likely found in Russia, where hundreds of manuscripts are held. More than a thousand of medieval manuscripts held at the National Library of Serbia (NBS) were destroyed during the Nazi bombing of Belgrade (1941) ordered by Adolf Hitler himself.

The Digital National Library of Serbia (NBS) has digitalized several manuscripts, included at their website.

The Digital National Library of Saint Petersburg, Russia (NLR) has digitalized several manuscripts, included at their website

== 11th–12th century ==
Work	Dating	Commissioner, author, editor	Description
Codex Marianus	early 11th century	Unknown	A tetraevangelion (Four Gospels) written in Glagolitic, in Serbian/Macedonian recension.
Dimitri's Psalter	11th century	Several scribes	Psalter, 145 parchment leaves, written in Glagolitic, partly in Serbian/Croatian recension.
Gršković's fragment of the Acts of the Apostles (Grškovićev odlomak Apostola)	end of 11th, early 12th century	Unknown	Fragment (4 leaves) of Acts of the Apostles, written in Glagolitic script, in Pre-Serbian Church Slavic recension, originating in Bosnia or Zeta–Hum area.
Mihanović's fragment of the Acts of the Apostles	end of 11th, early 12th century	Unknown	Orthodox-rite fragment of Acts of the Apostles, written in Glagolitic script, in Serbian Church Slavic recension.
Miroslav's Gospel	1180	Grigorije the Pupil for Miroslav of Hum	Gospel Book, Illustrated manuscript. Digitalized at NBS.
Charter of Ban Kulin	1189	Scribe Radoje for Ban Kulin	Trade agreement charter between the Banate of Bosnia and city of Ragusa (Dubrovnik).
Charter of Hilandar	1198	Stefan Nemanja and Athonite monk Sava	Founding charter to the Hilandar monastery on Mount Athos.
Karyes Typikon	1199	Athonite monk Sava	Typikon
Short Hagiography of St. Simeon Nemanja	1199–1200	Athonite monk Sava	Hagiography about Stefan Nemanja (monk Symeon), written by his son monk Sava.

== 13th century ==
Work	Dating	Commissioner, author, editor	Description
Charter of Hilandar (II)	1200–01	Stefan the First-Crowned	A charter to the Hilandar monastery on Mount Athos, a revision of the founding charter of Hilandar.
Prologue Hagiography of St. Symeon (Prološko žitije Svetog Simeona)	after 1200	Unknown	Hagiography about Stefan Nemanja (monk Symeon).
Studenica Typikon	1208	Archimandrite Sava	Typikon written by Archimandrite Sava. Digitalized at NBS.
Life of Stefan Nemanja/Hagiography of St. Symeon (Žitije svetog Simeona)	1208	Archimandrite Sava	Hagiographical/biographical work about Serbian monarch Stefan Nemanja, written by his son, Archimandrite Sava. Included in the introduction of the Studenica Typikon.
Vukan's Gospel	1200–08	Monk Simeon for Vukan Nemanjić	Gospel Book.
Psaltir Typikon	13th century	Archbishop Sava	Typikon
Letter to hegumen Spiridon	13th century	Archbishop Sava	Personal letter
Belgrade Prophetologion (Beogradski parimejnik)	Early 13th century	Unknown	Lectionary, a book of prophecies and readings from the Old Testament (prophetologion). Digitalized by NBS.
Hagiography of St. Symeon	1216	Stefan the First-Crowned	Hagiography about Stefan Nemanja (monk Symeon), commissioned by Stefan the First-Crowned. The autograph has not survived and the oldest copy is from the second half of the 14th century. It is held in Paris.
Zakonopravilo (St. Sava's Nomocanon)	1219	Saint Sava	Civil law and canon law (medieval constitution).
Bratko Menaion (Bratkov minej)	1234	Bratko	A liturgical calendar book (menaion) written by Orthodox monk-scribe Bratko, commissioned by magnate Obrad that served king Stefan Vladislav (r. 1234–43). Held at the National Library in Belgrade. Digitalized by NBS.
Hagiography of St. Symeon	1242–43	Domentijan	Hagiography about Stefan Nemanja (monk Symeon), written by Domentijan. The autograph has not survived and the oldest copies are from the 14th century. The oldest copy is held in the National Library of Serbia (Marko the Hilandarian's copy), while later copies are held in Odessa, Bucharest, Prague, and Vienna.
Life of St. Sava	1242–43	Domentijan	Hagiography about Saint Sava, written by Domentijan.
Charter of Ston	1253	Stefan Uroš I	Charter
Dragolj Code	1259	Monk Dragolj	Illuminated manuscript that includes the Treatise Against the Bogomils. Held at the National Library in Belgrade.
Life of St. Sava	1261	Teodosije the Hilandarian	Biography
The Life of St. Simeon	1264	Domentijan the Hilandarian	Biography
Belgrade Macedonian Oktoih	13th century		
Trebnik	13th century		
March menaion	13th century		
Hagiography	13th century	Saint Sava	Hagiography

== 14th century ==
Work	Dating	Commissioner, author, editor	Description
Visoki Dečani Tetraevangelion I (Četvorojevanđelje)	13th–14th c.	Unknown	241 parchment leaves. Held at Visoki Dečani. Digitalized at Visoki Dečani.
Charter to Hilandar	1302	Stefan Milutin	Lost
Časoslov	1300–10		
Life of King Milutin (Život kralja Milutina)	1323–26	Danilo II	Biography about Serbian king Stefan Milutin by Archbishop Danilo II (t. 1324–1337). Included in Lives of Serbian Kings and Archbishops.
Life of Stefan Dečanski (Život Stefana Dečanskog)	1330	Danilo II	Biography about Serbian king Stefan Dečanski (r. 1321–1331) by Archbishop Danilo II (t. 1324–1337). Included in Lives of Serbian Kings and Archbishops.
Life of Archbishop Danilo II (Život arhiepiskopa Danila II)	1337–1340	Danilo's student	Biography about Archbishop Danilo II (t. 1324–1337) by Danilo's student (fl. 1337–1340). Included in Lives of Serbian Kings and Archbishops.
Lives of Serbian Kings and Archbishops (Život kraljeva i arhiepiskopa srpskih)	1337–40, additions after 1375	Danilo II, Danilo's student, Danilo's continuators	Hagiographical/biographical work about Serbian monarchs and church leaders compiled by Archbishop Danilo II (t. 1324–1337), Danilo's student (fl. 1337–1340), and others dubbed "Danilo's continuators" (after 1375).
Life of St. Arsenije	1324–37	Danilo II	Biography
Rodoslov (carostavnik)	1337	Archbishop Nikodim	Biography
Dušan's Code	1349	Emperor Dušan	Constitution
Nikola Stanjević Gospel	1350	Monk Feoktist	Gospel Book written by monk Feoktist. Commissioned by magnate Nikola Stanjević (fl. 1355–1366) who donated it to Hilandar. It is held at the British Museum.
Serres Gospel	1354	Kalist Rasoder	A tetraevangelion (Four Gospels) written by Kalist Rasoder.
Charter of Hilandar	1360		Issued by emperor Uroš V for Hilandar.
Charter of Drenča	1382	Dorotej of Hilandar	charter for the monastery of Drenča
Charter of Ravanica	1381	Prince Lazar	Charter
Serbian Alexandride	14th century		Life of Alexander the Great
Gospel of St. Nicholas (Nikoljsko jevanđelje)	14th century		Gospel book, located in Ireland (Dublin RU 147)
Munich Serbian Psalter	1370–1395		Illuminated psalter
Oxford Serbian Psalter	late 14th century		Psalter
Visoki Dečani Tetraevangelion II (Četvorojevanđelje)	14th c.	Unknown	174 parchment leaves. Held at Visoki Dečani. Digitalized at Visoki Dečani.
Visoki Dečani Tetraevangelion III (Četvorojevanđelje)	14th c.	Unknown	327 parchment leaves. Held at Visoki Dečani. Digitalized at Visoki Dečani.
Visoki Dečani Jevanđelistar (Jevanđelistar)	14th c.	Unknown	158 parchment leaves. Held at Visoki Dečani. Digitalized at Visoki Dečani.
Visoki Dečani 1370s Tetraevangelion (Četvorojevanđelje)	1370s	Unknown	264 parchment leaves. Held at Visoki Dečani. Digitalized at Visoki Dečani.

== 15th century ==
Work	Dating	Commissioner, author, editor	Description
Gospel of St. Nicholas of Rošci (Nikoljsko jevanđelje)	End of 14th, early 15th century	Unknown	Gospel book.
Life of St. Stefan of Dečani	1402–09	Gregory Tsamblak	Biography
Mining Code	1412	Stefan Lazarević	Code of law
Karlovački rodoslov	1418–27		
Radoslav's Gospel (Radoslavljevo jevanđelje)	1429	scribe Radoslav	Gospel Book, located at the National Library of Russia in St. Petersburg. Digitalized at NBS.
Charter to St. Paul Monastery	1430	George Brankovic	Charter
Life of Despot Stefan Lazarević	1431	Constantine of Kostenets	Biography
Slovo o pravopisu	143X	Constantine of Kostenets	
Služabnik	1453		Located in the National Library of Serbia (RS 538)
Varaždin Apostol	1454	three transcribers	Apostol (Acts of the Apostles and the New Testament epistles)
Dečani chronicle	second half of the 15th century	18th-century transcription	
Cetinje Octoechos	1494	Hieromonk Makarije	Octoechos
Bogorodičnik	15th century		Theotokarion held in Hilandar.
Goražde Psalter	1521	Teodor Ljubavić	Printed psalter

== Early modern period ==
- Cetinje chronicle
- Belgrade Armorial II
- Tronoša chronicle
- Vrhobreznica Chronicle, 1650

== See also ==
- Medieval Serbian charters
- Medieval Serbian literature
- Medieval Serbian law
- Serbian chronicles

== Sources ==
- Cernic, L. and Bogdanovic, D., 1981. About Attribution of Medieval Serbian Cyrillic Manuscripts. Textology of Medieval South Slavic Literature.
- Čajka, František (2014). "Srbskocírkevněslovanský rukopis Modlitby sv. Řehoře" [The Serbian Church Slavonic Manuscript of the Prayer of St Gregory]. The Cyril and Methodius Mission and Europe: 1150 Years Since the Arrival of the Thessaloniki Brothers in Great Moravia (in Czech). pp. 300–303. ISBN 978-80-86023-51-9. OS LG 2023-08-18.
- Trifunović, Đorđe (1990). Azbučnik srpskih srednjevekovnih književnih pojmova (2 ed.). Belgrade: Nolit.
