= Vasilije Petrović =

Metropolitan bishop of Cetinje

Vasilije Petrović Василије Петровић
- Metropolitan of Montenegro
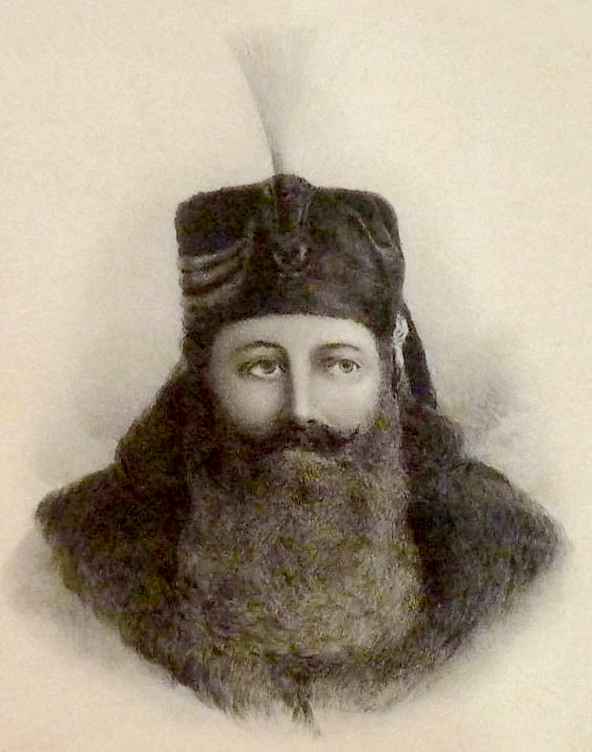
- An illustration of the metropolitan done by an unknown artist.
- Native name: Василије III Радуловић Петровић
- Church: Serbian Patriarchate of Peć
- Metropolis: Cetinje
- See: Cetinje
- Installed: 1744
- Term ended: March 10, 1766

Orders
- Ordination: by Atanasije II Gavrilović

Personal details
- Born: 1709 Njeguši, Prince-Bishopric of Montenegro
- Died: 10 March 1766 (aged 56–57) St. Petersburg, Russian Empire (now Russia)
- Buried: Annunciation Church of the Alexander Nevsky Lavra
- Denomination: Eastern Orthodox Christianity
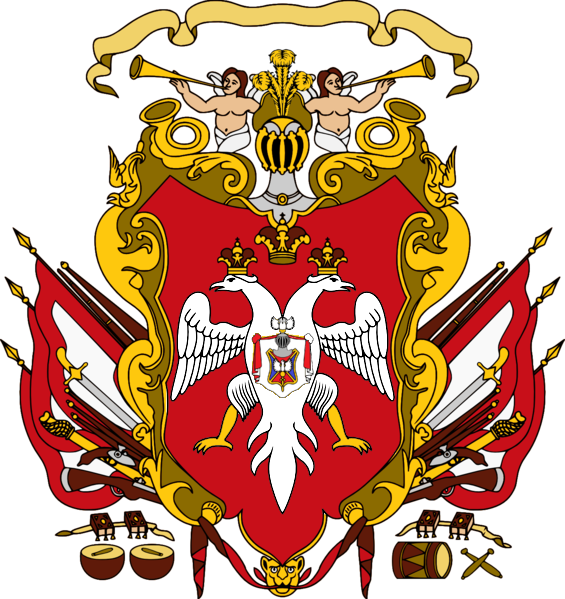
- Coat of arms

Vasilije Petrović (Serbian Cyrillic: Василије Петровић; 1709 – 10 March 1766) was the metropolitan bishop of Cetinje (Prince-Bishop of Montenegro), ruling with Sava Petrović, his cousin. He was author of the History of Montenegro, published in 1754.

From 1744 to 1766, Metropolitan Vasilije Petrović Njegoš, Sava's coadjutator, became effectively the highest authority in Montenegro and its representative abroad. After Vasilije died at St. Petersburg in 1766, Sava again resumed his duties as Metropolitan (Prince-Bishop).

== Background ==
The modern political history of Montenegro began with Metropolitan Danilo, a Metropolitan of Cetinje between 1697 and 1735 and the founder of a state ruled by a dynasty from the Petrović-Njegoš family. Danilo was eventually succeeded by his cousins, first by Sava Petrović, and then by Vasilije.

Bishop Sava was a secluded, contemplative man who dedicated himself more to religion than to politics. He had some influence among the tribesmen of Montenegro. He advocated for Montenegrin dependence on Russia as a means of defeating the Ottoman Empire and achieving statehood for Montenegro. He also maintained good relations with the Republic of Venice.

== Term ==
=== Background ===
Through the efforts of Metropolitan Sava, the Podmaine Monastery near Budva, dedicated to the Assumption of the Blessed Virgin Mary, was renovated and expanded in 1736, and the Stanjevići Monastery, dedicated to the Holy Trinity, was built in 1747. While Sava was in Russia, Archimandrite Vasilije replaced him on the chair of the Montenegrin Metropolitanate.

During his term, Vasilije ruled together with his cousin Sava as coadjutor. From 1752 to 1754, he stayed in Russia and thereafter made additional trips to gain Russian assistance. With the help of Russian arms, he went to war with the Ottomans and then had to seek refuge in Russia. Sources state that he was the complete opposite of his predecessor, Sava Petrović. Sava was a seclusive, contemplative man, while Vasilije was bold, broad-minded and conceptual.

According to Sava Vuković, at the request of Metropolitan Sava, Vasilije prepared for the monastic order in the Peć Patriarchate, where he was probably tonsured. After passing through all the ranks, he was ordained an archimandrite. During Metropolitan Sava's stay in Russia, archimandrite Vasilije replaced him in all matters of an ecclesiastical and political nature. Due to the action he took in Venice in 1744, a tribal crisis occurred in Montenegro and a conflict with Sava Petrović. Later, relations improved.

=== Reign ===
Vasilije's reputation grew in Montenegro. He was an intermediary between the Patriarch of Peć in the Ottoman Empire and the Serbian Church in the Austrian lands. He first visited Karlovci as the Patriarch's envoy at the end of July 1749, during the National Assembly. In the spring of the following year, Atanasije II Gavrilović, the Patriarch of Peć, and three metropolitans sent Vasilije to the Russian emperor for alms. However, Vasilije stayed in Srem and visited the monasteries of Vrdnik and Karlovci. He then returned to Belgrade, where, on the recommendation of Sava, Atanasije II ordained him as the new Metropolitan of Cetinje and appointed him "Exarch of the Most Holy Throne of Peć" on August 22, 1750, in Belgrade. As exarch, Vasilije was sent to Vienna to return church property. He used his stay in Vienna to address Empress Maria Theresa with a memorandum, in which he explained the past of Montenegro and the Montenegrins' intention to become completely independent and therefore asked for the help of the Viennese court.

While Sava was in Russia, Vasilije travelled to the Republic of Venice with six elders in early April, where he addressed the Venetian Senate with a series of petitions on various matters. Upon Sava's return to Montenegro, a conflict arose between him and Vasilije. Vasilije was in favor of a constant fight with the Turks, and he also gladly watched the Montenegrins' plundering incursions into Venetian and Ragusan territory. Sava had the full support of the Venetians in suppressing Vasilije. Later, relations were smoothed over.

As he had a conflict with Metropolitan Nenadović, in March 1751, upon his return, he was banished to the Krušedol Monastery in Srem, and for that reason no attention was paid to his memorandum. After a few months, he was released from custody, and in mid-July 1751 he returned to Zadar and from there to Montenegro. Working to strengthen ties with Russia, Metropolitan Vasilije went to Russia three times. During his stay in Vienna between 1750 and 1766, he asked Empress Maria Theresa to take Montenegro under her protection and unsuccessfully tried to convince her that "since the time of Alexander the Great" Montenegro had been a "separate republic.. [over which] rules her metropolitan". On this occasion, Vasilije realized that he could not expect any significant help from Austria, so he turned completely to Russia.

==== First trip to Russia ====
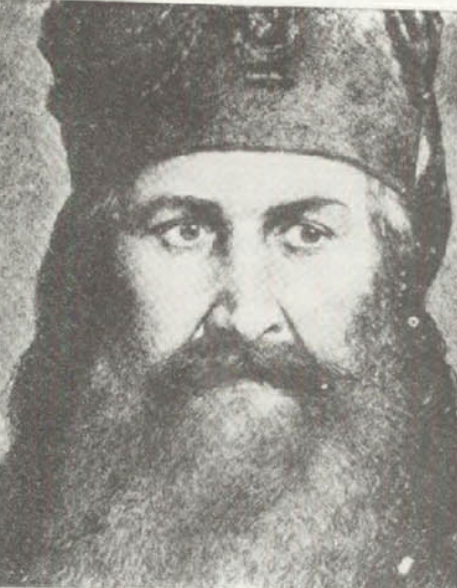
A rarer illustration of Vasilije Petrović Njegoš.

In the spring of 1752, he traveled to Russia with the recommendation of Metropolitan Sava and Montenegrin leaders. At the beginning of 1753, he arrived in Moscow. Vasilije was well received in Russia, and he established numerous contacts with Russian dignitaries. He raised the issue of the migration of Montenegrins to Russia and the issue of the state status of Montenegro. The Russian government suggested that as the Montenegrins did not pay tribute to the Turks and were in constant war with them they were therefore a free people.

Metropolitan Vasilije worked to eradicate blood feuds and establish schools and a printing press. He sent about twenty young men to Russia for education because "Montenegro felt a great need for educated people." This practice continued later. Wanting to acquaint Russia with the difficulties that Montenegro was struggling with, Metropolitan Vasilije wrote and printed an uncritical edition of his History of Montenegro in 1754.

His History of Montenegro (written in 1754) was immediately translated into Italian for the needs of the Venetian Republic. Thus, its first critic was the provost-general for Venetian Dalmatia, Francesco Grimani. This book was otherwise dedicated to Russian vice-chancellor Mikhail Ilarionovich Vorontsov. In Russia, Vasilije resolutely stood up against some Serbs from Bosnia and Herzegovina who falsely presented themselves as counts, and other adventurers who presented themselves as Montenegrin chieftains. He even told Vorontsov "that no one be recognized in Russia as a Montenegrin without our certificate." He claimed that only Montenegrins were worthy of the attention of the Russian court. In Russia, Vasilije received aid for the Cetinje Monastery in the form of relics and church books, money for travel expenses, and 5,000 rubles in aid also for the Cetinje Monastery. He returned to Montenegro in mid-September 1755 via Vienna, where he was received in audience by the Austrian emperor.

Vasilije's return from Russia marked a change in policy towards both Venice and the Ottoman Empire. Vasilije boasted about Russian aid. With it, he built a new church in Maine near Budva, and the Stanjevići monastery became a hotbed of Russian agitation. Because of this, the Venetians decided to poison him. From the end of 1755 to November 1756, the inquisitors issued orders for poisoning three times, and the men designated for this job were Marko Kažanegra and Domeniko Bubić. The Ottomans also threatened to attack Montenegro because Vasilije refused to pay the tribute.

==== Second Trip to Russia ====
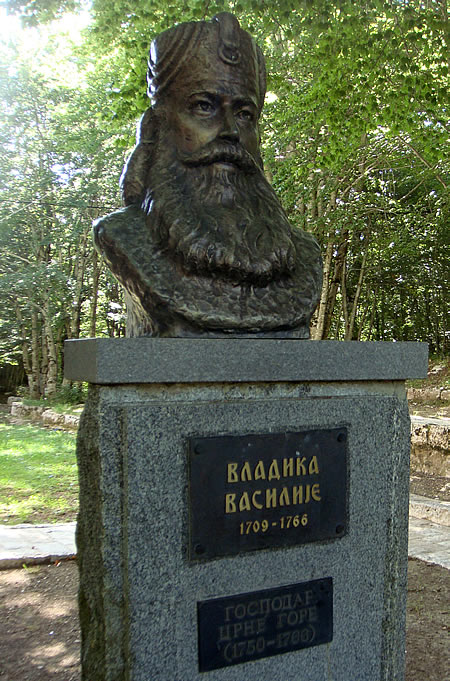
A bust of Vasilije.

Soon, Vasilije and Teodosije Mrkojević secretly left Montenegro on November 11, 1756, and went to Rijeka, and from there to Russia. The Ottomans attacked Montenegro and entered Čevo, but they were stopped in Tomići, and then withdrew, although they caused great losses to the people. In Russia, Vasilije advocated for the immigration of Montenegrins to Russia. In four years, from 1756 to 1760, 1499 inhabitants moved to Russia, but a number returned because they could not adapt to the new conditions. With Vasilije, guvernadur Radonjić, serdar Vukale Vukotić, vojvoda Mojaš Plamenac, Prele Đurašković and Teodosije Mrkojević came to Russia. In Russia itself, divisions and conflicts arose among them. Some sided with Vasilije, and some against him, led by pro-Venetian guvernadur Radonjić. This group of leaders had previously returned to Montenegro. Vasilije personally received 1000 rubles from Russia, and 3000 rubles as aid to the Cetinje Monastery, while the Russian Synod awarded the monastery and Vasilije 1132 rubles in aid.

Vasilije arrived in Montenegro on August 9, 1759, disembarking near Budva, with a "large presence and enthusiasm of the people, who fired their rifles." With him came the Russian delegate Stefan Justinov Puchkov and an engineer, who was supposed to investigate whether there was any ore in Montenegro. Vasilije went to Stanjevići, and a mass of people from Boka, Grbalj and Paštrovići simply besieged the monastery. Puchkov stayed in Montenegro until September 20, and then returned to Russia via Dubrovnik, Barletta and Naples. He submitted a negative report, claiming "The people are savages. Montenegrins have no rights or laws among themselves. It would be difficult to establish government." Puchkov wrote of Vasilije that he was "restless by nature, ambitious, greedy like everyone else, a troublemaker and slanderer." Puchkov measured Montenegro by European standards, and was unable to understand the essence of Montenegrin tribal society. His report disrupted Montenegrin-Russian relations. Vasilije remained silent and waited for a new opportunity to establish relations with Russia. That opportunity arose on the occasion of the accession to the Russian throne of Empress Catherine II. In early June 1762, Sava and Vasilije sent their nephews Nikola and Ivan with letters to the empress. In one of the letters, the empress was asked to take the Montenegrins into her service. Nothing came of it. The Russian government paid the two men their travel expenses and recommended that the Montenegrins live in peace with their neighbors. Vasilije was openly told not to come to Russia. The year of 1763 was tough, thus Vasilije asked Ragusan citizens to "Give aid to our church and Montenegrin people with a sum of aspers as the Serbs aid the Serbs and their neighbors."

The Venetians particularly disputed the rights of the Montenegrin metropolitans in the diocese of Novi. The people of Novi had their own bishop, but after the deaths of metropolitans Savatije and Stefan, the Venetians ignored their requests to appoint a new metropolitan, and therefore Sava consecrated churches in this area and ordained priests. After that, the people of Novi were practically under the jurisdiction of the Montenegrin metropolitans. Vasilije Petrović ordained Dositej Obradović in the Stanjevići monastery on Easter 1764. In early June of the same year, Sava and Vasilije consecrated Genadije Vasiljević, who had come to Montenegro from Russia via Dalmatia, as a Dalmatian archimandrite. During Vasilije's time, a conflict also broke out over the Orthodox Church of St. Luke in Kotor. The Venetians sought to place it under the administration of other Orthodox peoples, and so they placed the church under the administration of the Greeks. The Montenegrin leaders sent a sharp protest to the Kotor governor, pointing out that the church was built for the Montenegrins and Boka: "[...] to serve the people with prayer and liturgy before God in their natural Slavic-Serbian language. How can the Greeks come to Kotor, having taken from us Saint Luke, whom the Greeks, through espionage and betrayal, lost to the principle of the pre-war: Cyprus, and Candia and Morea. And why did they not guard and shed blood around their border like we did around this one, but they also betrayed the Serbs in Kosovo, and now the quick Greeks want to move into Kotor in the name of Saint Luke through cunning."

==== Third Trip to Russia ====
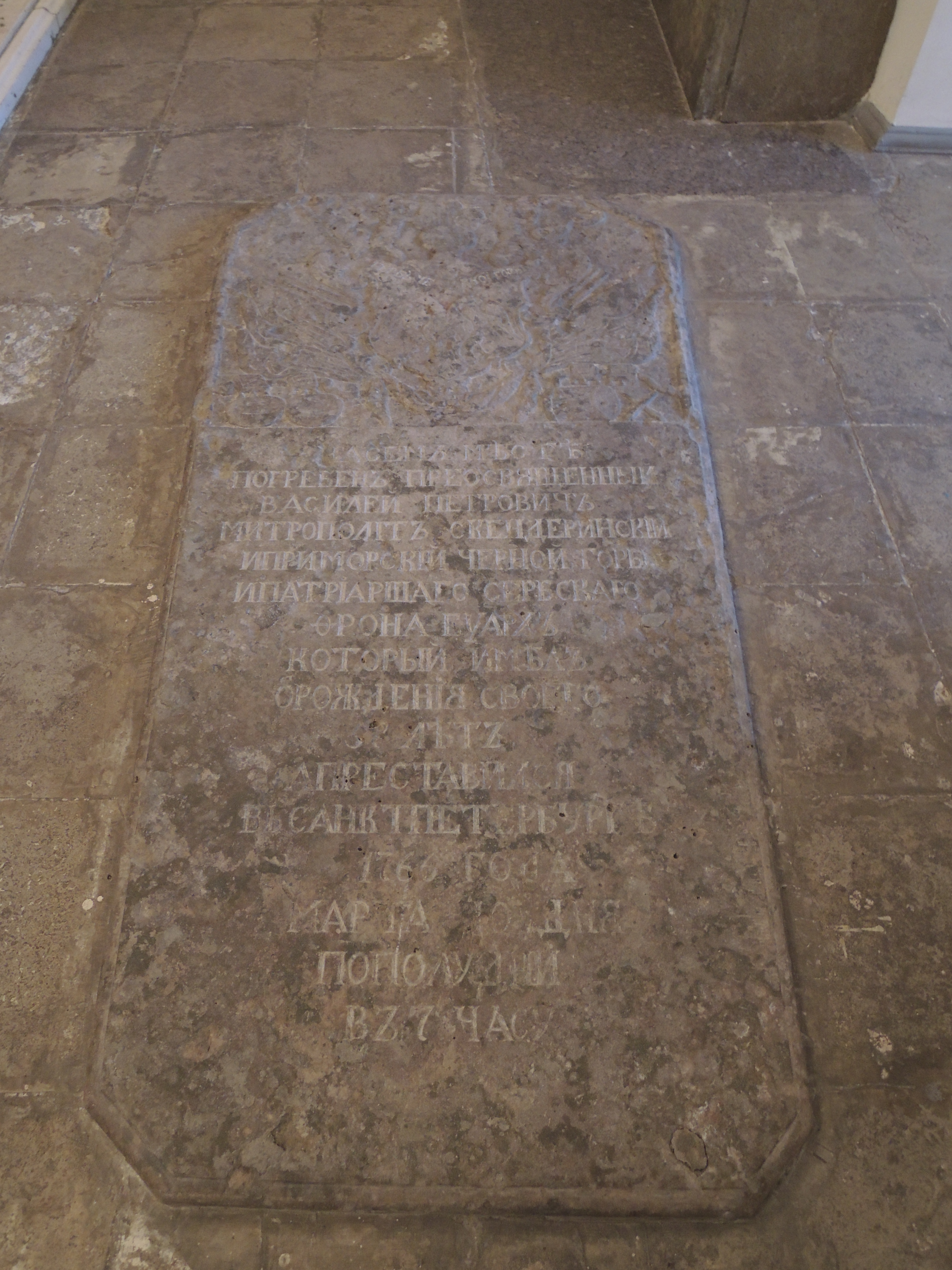
Tombstone of Vasilije Petrović with "Metropolitan of Montenegro, Skenderija and Primorje, and Exarch of the Serb throne" written on it

Vasilije was deeply troubled by the distrust coming from Russia, so he decided to travel there a third time. He did so in early June 1765. He boarded in Budva and sailed to Rijeka, then to Vienna. He was accompanied by hieromonk Josif Vukićević and hierodeacon Petar Petrović, whom Vasilije had taken to Russia for education, and Teodosije Mrkojević, a companion with whom Vasilije clashed and reconciled with several times. Mrkojević reached Vienna with them, but did not continue on to St. Petersburg. According to Venetian reports, Vasilije was received in Vienna by Empress Maria Theresa, and then he headed for Russia via Bavaria and Prussia. At the end of October 1765, Vasilije arrived in St. Petersburg via Kiev and was given modest accommodation there.

Although he addressed the Russian authorities, he failed to have Empress Catherine II receive him in audience, although the Montenegrin delegation was provided with a living allowance. Vasilije took advantage of the Liturgy in the court church, when the empress received church dignitaries, including him. However, he suddenly fell ill from pneumonia. Sensing the end, he dictated a will in the presence of hierodeacon Petar Petrović and hieromonk Josif Vukićević, but death prevented him from signing it. In the last moments of his life, he dictated this message to the empress: "If I die, do not leave the Montenegrin people without attention and merciful defense."

He was buried in the Annunciation Church of the Alexander Nevsky Lavra in St. Petersburg. The tombstone, which is still preserved today, is carved with the coat of arms of Montenegro with the inscription that "the Metropolitan of Montenegro, the Littoral, Skenderija and the Exarch of the Throne of Peć" rests here. News of Vasilije's death was received in Montenegro in July.

== Aftermath ==
On the recommendation of the Collegium of Foreign Affairs, Empress Catherine II ordered that Vasilije's legacy be transferred to Montenegro, and for this purpose she appointed Lieutenant Mikhail Tarasov, accompanied by translator Ivan Šefer, to go to Montenegro together with Josif Vukićević and Petar Petrović. When they arrived in Montenegro, Tarasov presented Sava with 1,500 rubles in aid. Tarasov's report on Montenegro was said to be quite different from Puchkov's.

After Vasilije, Sava took power and continued with the same foreign policy as before, allying himself with Venice. That did not last long, however, as Šćepan Mali who claimed to be the Russian Tsar Peter III himself, managed to convince the people that he should rule Montenegro. He immediately severed ties with Venice altogether, implemented the strict rule of law, began building roads until his life was cut short in 1773 by an assassin sent by the Vizier of Skadar.

Sava returned to serve as metropolitan once again, and after him, his nephew, Arsenije Plamenac of Crmnica, became the Metropolitan of Cetinje between 1781 and 1784 and earlier the co-adjutor to Metropolitan Sava Petrović during the reign of Šćepan Mali (1767–73). But Arsenije, too, was soon to die, in 1784. Once again, a member of the house of Petrović-Njegoš, now Petar I Petrović-Njegoš, was inaugurated.

== Literary works ==
The writing and teaching of Montenegrin history was a chief interest for most of Vasilije's life, as well as his occupation as a spiritual leader. Istorija o Černoj Gori (History of Montenegro), published in St. Petersburg in 1754, is his most renowned work. Through accounts from ordinary citizens, the book represented the first attempt to write the history of Montenegro.

It was an effort on the part of Vasilije to gain Russian political support for Montenegro against the Ottomans by highlighting and mythologizing Montenegrin struggles. It put forth the idea of Montenegrin independence for the first time, though it did not have a large immediate impact. Parts of the Cetinje chronicle, a collection of manuscripts (letters, documents, reports and poems), are also attributed to him, as well as him adding his own writings to it.

== Bibliography ==
- History of Montenegro (Serbian Cyrillic: Историја о Черној Гори)
- Ode to Nemanja (Serbian Cyrillic: Похвала Немањи)
- Cetinje Chronicle (Serbian Cyrillic: Цетињски љетопис)

== Title ==
- Metropolitan of Skenderija and Primorje of Montenegro, and Exarch of the Serb patriarchal throne (smjerni mitropolit skenderijski i primorski Crnoj Gori i patrijaršijskog trona srpskoga egzarh).

Eastern Orthodox Church titles
Preceded by Sava	Metropolitan of Cetinje; 1744–1766	Succeeded by Sava
