= Maksim Tujković =

Serbian monk

Maksim Tujković was an early 18th-century Serbian monk of the Cetinje monastery who often traveled as an icon painter and woodcarver. He learned his craft and art at the Boka Kotorska School of Dimitrijević-Rafailović in Risan.

He is best known for his paintings in the monastery of Nikoljac, the Patriarchate of Peć and the Sarajevo church, where his pieces of art can be seen alongside famous works by older painters. He was one of the best Serbian icon painters of the first half of the eighteenth century. A contemporary of Rafailo Dimitrijević, Maksim Tujković was born in the village of Tujkovića, near Kotor, around the turn of the 18th century (1700), and in time he became known professionally as Maksim Tujković the zograf.

His first known works are two throne icons in the church of Holy Mary (Sv. Gospođa) at Njeguši, on the right central icon of Jesus Christ with the apostles, dating from 1720. There it mentions the children of Staniša Radonjić -- Vukosav, Jovo, and Marko -- evidently the ktitor of the project. In that same church, Staniša Radonjić is mentioned in an inscription by another contemporary painter Rafailo Dimitrijević from 1756. In the monastery of Nikoljac Tujković worked on the completion of the iconostasis in 1723 and this is where his best carving work is located.

== See also ==
- Dimitrije Daskal
- List of painters from Serbia
- Serbian art
- Kyr Kozma (also known as Jovan of Hilandar)
- Zograf Radul
- Andrija Raičević
- Avesalom Vujičić
- Georgije Mitrofanović
- Pop Danilo
- Zograf Longin
- Lovro Dobričević
