= Lives of Serbian Kings and Archbishops =

- Original title: Животи краљева и архиепископа српских
- Created: 1337–40, with later additions
- Commissioned by: Danilo II
- Author(s): Danilo II, Danilo's student, "Danilo's continuators"
- Subject: Serbian monarchs and church leaders
- Purpose: hagiography/biography collection

The Lives of Serbian Kings and Archbishops (Serbian: Животи краљева и архиепископа српских, romanized: Životi kraljeva i arhiepiskopa Srpskih), also known as Danilo's Collection (Serbian: Данилов зборник, romanized: Danilov zbornik) is a hagiography/biography collection on selected Serbian monarchs of the Nemanjić dynasty and Serbian Orthodox church leaders (archbishops and patriarchs) compiled by Archbishop Danilo II (t. 1324–1337), Danilo's student (fl. 1337–1340), and others dubbed "Danilo's continuators".

The work was created by Danilo II, and was then continued by his student and continuators, to include also the biography on Danilo II himself.

Đura Daničić published the work in 1866. N. Radojičić analyzed the work in 1935.

== Content ==
=== Kings ===
| Kings | Author or editor | Daničić edition length |
|---|---|---|
| Stefan Radoslav (r. 1223–1234) | Danilo II | 7 lines |
| Stefan Vladislav (r. 1234–1243) | Danilo II | 2 pages |
| Stefan Uroš (r. 1243–1276) | Danilo II | 14 pages |
| Stefan Dragutin (r. 1276–1282) | Danilo II | 31 pages |
| Queen Jelena (d. 1314) | Danilo II | 47 pages |
| Stefan Milutin (r. 1282–1321) | Danilo II | 59 pages |
| Stefan Dečanski (r. 1321–1331) | Danilo's student | 52 pages |
| Stefan Dušan (r. 1331–1355) | Danilo's student | 16 pages |

=== Archbishops ===
| Archbishops | Author or editor | Daničić edition length |
|---|---|---|
| Arsenije (t. 1233–1263) | Danilo II | 38 pages |
| Sava II (1263-1271) | Danilo II | 2 pages |
| Danilo I (1271-1271) | Danilo II | 7 lines |
| Joanikije I (1272-1276, d. 1279) | Danilo II | 15 pages |
| Jevstatije I (1279-1282) | Danilo II | 27 pages |
| Jakov (1286-1292) | Danilo II | 1 page |
| Jevstatije II (1292-1309) | Danilo II | 2 pages |
| Sava III (1309-1316) | Danilo II | 2 pages |
| Nikodim (1317-1324) | Danilo's continuators | 2 pages |
| Danilo II (1324-1337) | Danilo's student | 49 pages |
| Patriarch Joanikije II (1338-1354) | Danilo's continuators | 2 pages |
| Patriarch Sava IV (1354-1375) | Danilo's continuators | 4 pages |
| Patriarch Jefrem (installed 1375) | Danilo's continuators | 3 pages |

== See also ==
- Serbian manuscripts
- Serbian chronicles

== Sources ==
- Daničić, Đura, ed. (1866). Животи краљева и архиепископа српских, написао архиепископ Данило и други. Загреб: Штампарија Светозара Галца – via Дигитална БМС.
- Birnbaum, Henrik (1974). "The Old Serbian 'Vita'". On Medieval and Renaissance Slavic Writing: Selected Essays. Walter de Gruyter GmbH & Co KG. pp. 299–340. ISBN 978-3-11-088591-0.
- McDaniel, Gordon Lawrence (1980). The Lives of the Serbian Kings and archbishops by Danilo II: textual history and criticism (PhD thesis). University of Washington.
- Radojičić, N., ed. (1935). Животи краљева и архиепископа српских (PDF).
