= Vrdnik (disambiguation) =

Vrdnik is a village in Srem, Vojvodina, Serbia.

Vrdnik may also refer to:

- Vrdnik-Ravanica Monastery, a monastery in Srem, Vojvodina, Serbia
- Vrdnik Transcript, a copy of the Ravanica Charter

== See also ==
- Vrdnik
