= Aleksandar Sandić =

Serbian historian, cultural worker and politician

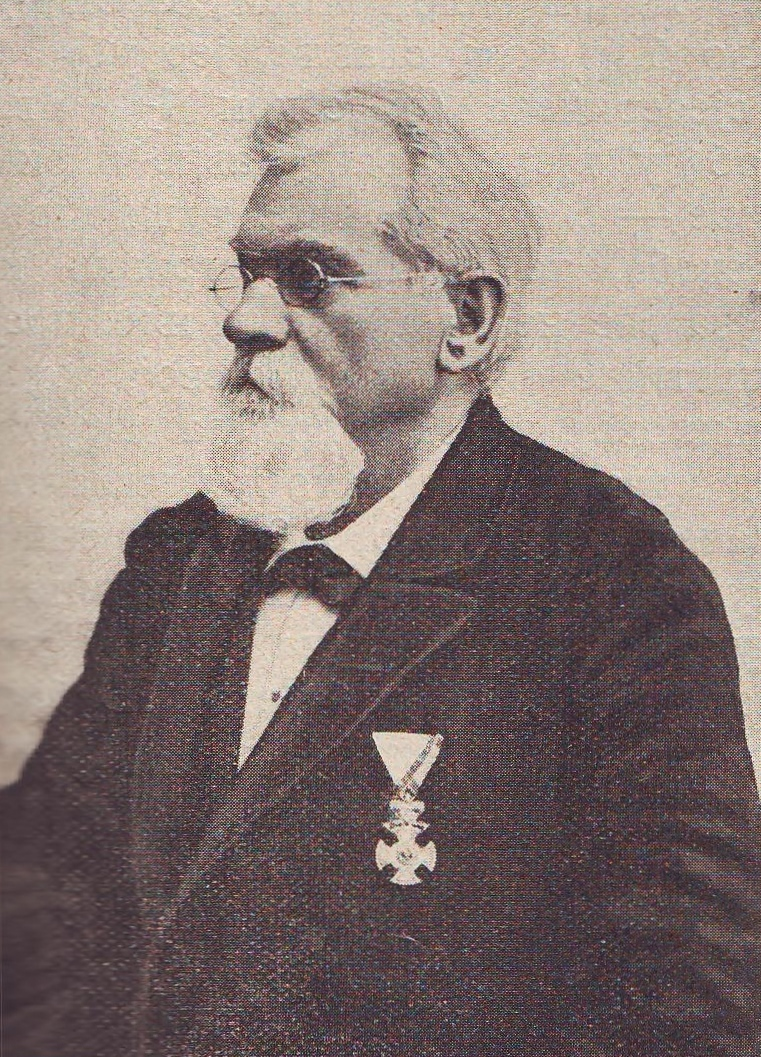
Aleksandar Sandic Portrait

Aleksandar Sandić (Veliki Beckerek, Austrian Empire, today's Zrenjanin, Serbia, 14 May 1836 - Novi Sad, then Habsburg Monarchy, today's Serbia, 15 April 1908) was a Serbian historian, cultural worker and politician. He was an elected member of the Serbian Royal Academy in 1897.

== Biography ==
He was educated at Veliki Bečerek and Timișoara and studied law and Slavonic philology in Vienna with Franz Miklosich as a scholarship holder of Matica srpska, between 1857 and 1861. In Vienna, he met Vuk Stefanović Karadžić and became his secretary and energetic advocate for his language reform. In 1861 Sandić became a teacher of the Serbian language and literature at the Karlovci Gymnasium. In 1862 he joined the editorial board of the radical Viennese newspaper Ost und West, which tried to bridge the German world with the Slavic world. He worked as an assistant editor to Imbre Tkalec and after his departure, Sandić also worked as an editor for the same newspaper in 1864 and 1865. He became a professor of English and Serbian language and literature at the Serbian Gymnasium in Novi Sad in 1866. Since the 1870s, he actively participated in the work of the Matica srpska and the Serbian National Theater in Novi Sad. He was a four-time member of the National Church Council in Sremski Karlovci as a representative of the Serbian People's Freedom Party, Svetozar Miletić.

He began working as a "jurist" (lawyer) in Vienna, collaborating first in Serbian newspapers Vienna's "Svetovid" from 1857 and Novi Sad's Miletić's "Serbian Diary". Later he expanded his cooperation with a large number of Serbian newspapers and magazines, mainly in Novi Sad. In addition to writing, he worked on translating works by notable writers Goethe, Mosenthal, Kanitz into Serbian. He also translated and supplemented with historical facts in 1862, works by Felix Philipp Kanitz's "Byzantine Monuments in Serbia", Johann Christophe Bartenstein's "A brief account of the scattered Illyrian nation", and V. Pasha's "History of the World" (in three volumes). After the departure of the editor Imre Tkalec, he published and edited in Vienna a newspaper which was published in German and served the Slavic and German interests - Ost und West ("East and West") from 1862 until 1865. At the request of Archimandrite German Anđelić (who later became Serbian Patriarch), he launched in 1868 and edited - wrote articles for a year, the first (outside Serbia) Serbian ecclesiastical newspaper Beseda, with the addition of "Spiritual Proceedings". In this "Proceedings," church words and sermons were published. He was also invited and wrote three textbooks on religious education in primary schools. Sandić was much involved in Serbian historiography; collected material for the history of Serbian literature and the Serbian movement 1848-1849. He did not leave any more extensive works. Worthy of note is his 1885 venture with a valuable written monument. He photographed the "Charter of Ravanica" of Lazar of Serbia, issued to his endowment - the monastery in 1381. With this diploma, a large national seal was also stamped on it. These items were printed in several dimensions, and with them, the Sandić wrote a comprehensive description and expert explanations. He published the illustrated edition in 1885, to bring to the nation a worthy testimony to his old glory and high positions, in the Middle Ages. The Ravanica Chrysovul - a gold-plated imperial letter with a golden imperial seal, which is considered to be one of the most beautiful Serbian mediaeval monuments.

== Works ==
- Beseda na opelo Dr-a Vuka Stef. Karadžića, 1864
- Miloŝ Obilić: srpska narodna pevanija, 1885
- Rosmarin und Myrte in Hochzeitskränzen: monteregrinische Hochzeitslegende, 1901
- Pomen Triest-godišni po smrti Vuku Stefanoviću Karadžiću, 1894
- Kratak izveštaj o stanju rasejanoga mnogobrojnoga ilirskoga naroda, Johann Christoph Bartenstein, Preveo Aleksandar Sandić/A brief account of the scattered Illyrian nation, Johann Christoph Bartenstein, Translated by Aleksandar Sandić, 1866
- Kraljević Marko u slikama, 1884
