= Pandeh =

Pandeh (Serbian and Bulgarian: Пандех: 13th century) was a writer of a story from 1259 known as Proročanskom skazaniju or "According to Prophecy", which dealt with contemporary political events of the time in Medieval Serbia and Bulgaria.

In Pandeh's manuscript, the author lived in Medieval Serbia at the time of Stefan Uroš I. The work mentioned Konstantin Tih Asen (1257-1277) as "the first" in the following context:

When two are fighting, the third will be the first.

That meant the three-way battle for supremacy at the time between the monarch of Hungary, Béla IV of Hungary, the Byzantine emperor John IV Laskaris and Bulgaria's Konstantin Tih Asen.

== Translation into modern Serbian ==
"Pandeh" in the manuscript of Pop Dragolj, in "Old Serbian records and inscriptions", prepared by professor Milorad Pavić, Ph.D., was printed in Belgrade in Prosveta and SKZ, 1986, p. 36–37.

== Literature ==
- Dejan Mihailović: Byzantine Circle (Small Dictionary of Early Christian Literature in Greek, Byzantine and Old Serbian Literature), Belgrade, "Institute for Textbooks", 2009, p. 142-143.
