= Serbian chronicles =

This is a list of Serbian chronicles, a group of early Serbian historiographical works (genealogies and annals) from the late medieval and early modern periods, hence called the Old Serbian annals and genealogies (Serbian: Стари српски родослови и летописи / Stari srpski rodoslovi i letopisi). There exist approximately 50 Serbian works of these types from the period between the 15th and the 18th centuries, written in the old Serbian language and Cyrillic script. They are divided into letopisi (annals) and rodoslovi (genealogies).

Name	Time frame	Composed	Notes
Carostavnik		14th century	
Vrhobreznica Chronicle	–1371	1650	Gavrilo, a hermit, collected earlier annals in his redaction composed in 1650 at the Vrhobreznica monastery. Part of a manuscript archived as Prague Museum #29 (together with Vrhobreznica Genealogy).
Vrhobreznica Genealogy		1650	Gavrilo, a hermit, shortened an earlier original in his redaction composed in 1650 at the Vrhobreznica monastery. Part of a manuscript archived as Prague Museum #29 (together with Vrhobreznica Chronicle).
Constantine's Genealogy	1166–1431	1431	Constantine of Kostenets's Life of Despot Stefan Lazarević includes a genealogy of the Nemanjić dynasty up until Despot Stefan Lazarević, in chapters 14–16. Survived in several manuscripts.
Koporin Chronicle	–1371	1453	Damjan, a deacon, wrote the annals on the order of Archbishop of Zeta, Josif, at the Koporin monastery.
Studenica Chronicle	–in 14th c.	1350–1400	Oldest survived copy in a 16th-century manuscript, together with a younger annals.
Cetinje Chronicle	–in 14th c.	end of 16th c.	A manuscript collection from the end of the 16th c.
Karlovac Chronicle		1418–27	
Dečani Chronicle		1450–1500	1595 manuscript.
Karlovci Chronicle		1503	
Tronoša Chronicle		1526	1791 manuscript.
Peć Chronicle	–in 14th c.	early 16th c.	
Ruvarac's Genealogy	–in 16th c.	1533–1584	The manuscript written 1712–25, archived as 'Karl. patr. bibl. br. 175', includes a genealogy, list of Serbian patriarchs, and a younger annals.
Berković Chronicle			
Branković Chronicle			
Ostojić Chronicle			
Sečenić Chronicle			
Vukomanović Chronicle			
Pejatović Chronicle		17th c.	17th-century manuscript, published by At. Pejatović in Spomenik XXXVIII. Archived as 'Nar. Bibl. br. 631'.
Ćorović Chronicle			A manuscript dating to the end of 17th c./beg. 18th c., published by Vladimir Ćorović in Spomenik LXVI. Archived as 'III a 43'.
Magarašević Chronicle			
Pajsije's Genealogy		pre-1642	Pajsije, Serbian Patriarch (1614–1647), included a genealogy in the Life of Emperor Uroš.

== Non-Serbian chronicles including Serbian history ==
- De Administrando Imperio (960), by Constantine VII
- Chronicle of the Priest of Duklja (possibly 14th century)
- Kingdom of the Slavs (1601), by Mavro Orbini

== See also ==
- Serbian manuscripts

== Sources ==
- Ćirković, Sima (2004). The Serbs. Malden: Blackwell Publishing.
- Stojanović, Ljubomir (1927). Stari srpski rodoslovi i letopisi. Srpska kraljevska akademija.
- Dvornik, Francis (1962). "Slavic Medieval Cultural Achievements". The Slavs in European History and Civilization. Rutgers University Press. ISBN 978-0-8135-0799-6.
