= Dimitrije Daskal =

Painter Dimitrije Daskal (c. 1660-after 1718) was the founder and head of the Dimitrijević-Rafailović family of painters whose ten members, from the seventeenth to the second half of the nineteenth century, painted icons and murals on the southern coast of Montenegro and southern Bosnia and Herzegovina.

== Biography ==
He was born around 1660 in Kotor in the Republic of Venice. He left information about his ancestors in the inscription on the icon of the Assumption of the Virgin in Morača. At the end of the 1670s, he studied under the tutelage of Zograf Radul, with whom he painted the Church of the Holy Trinity (one of the six churches) in the Praskvica Monastery in 1680. Around 1680 he settled in Risan, a decade before the Great Migration. He had a daughter and four sons - Gabriel, Daniel, George, and Raphael—who followed his footsteps. He was a contemporary of Tripo Kokolja.

== Artistic work ==
Dimitrije painted several churches, including St. George in Šišići in 1699, St. Petka in Mrkovima in 1704, St. Nicholas in Pelinovo in 1718, and he is also credited with frescoes in the now-demolished church of St. Mina in Preradi. He also left behind a considerable number of iconic works such as four icons from 1680 -- Deesis, Our Lady of Christ and the Archangels, St. Nicholas, St. George and St. John the Forerunner of All Serbian Saints—in the Church of Saints Peter and Paul in Risan, two lintels with representations of the Nedremanj Eye and the Hospitality of Abraham in the church of St. Luke in Kotor in 1688, iconostasis in St. George in Šišići in 1690, and during 1716. He painted about 35 icons for the iconostasis in the village of Pelinovo in Grbalj, Montenegro, which was not preserved. In Morača monastery he painted the icons Saint Luke painting the Virgin, now in the Collection of Icons Sekulić in Belgrade, the use of John the Forerunner in the National Museum in Belgrade, both from the end of the seventeenth century and the Assumption of the Virgin with scenes related to the Virgin in 1713. To his hand, with more or less certainty, are the icons from the iconostasis in Mrkovima around 1703, the icon of Avram's Hospitality from Praskvica from 1714, the design act from the National Museum in Belgrade, as well as iconic works in the Savina, Piva, and Krka monasteries and the Church of St. George in Srpska, near Podgorica.

Dimitrije accepted most of his iconographic and stylistic choices from his teacher Zograf Radul and from Zograf Jovan. He inherited compositional and color solutions, figure processing and the organization of space, but is distinguished from the works of older masters by a more pronounced schematization of forms, a more refined and less noble color selection, and coarser processing. Some of Dimitrije's works also feature some of the less frequently presented iconographic themes, such as certain scenes in the extensive cycles of Saint Petka in Mrkovima and St. Nicholas in Pelinovo, an extensive cycle of the church calendar on the frescoes in Pelinovo, compositions by the Virgin Mary the Living East and the Virgin Mary's Cover on the icon of the Assumption of the Virgin in the Morača Monastery.

== See also ==
- Maksim Tujković
- List of painters from Serbia
- Serbian art
- Kyr Kozma (also known as Jovan of Hilandar)
- Zograf Radul
- Andrija Raičević
- Avesalom Vujičić
- Georgije Mitrofanović
- Pop Danilo
- Zograf Longin
- Lovro Dobričević
