= Andrija Raičević =

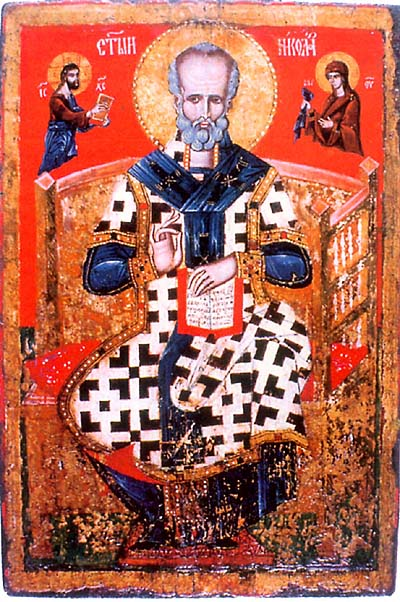
St. Nicholas, Sarajevo Church of the Holy Archangels (Old Orthodox Church). Tempera on wood 59 × 39.2 cm, Andrija Raičević, 1641

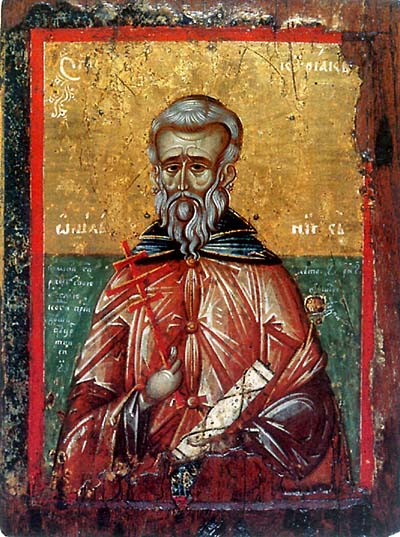
St. Kirijak the hermit, Sarajevo Church of the Holy Archangels (Old Orthodox Church). Tempera on wood 32.5 × 24.2 cm, Andrija Raičević, 1649.

Andrija Raičević (c. 1610 - after 1673) was a Serbian iconographer and miniaturist who worked during the Ottoman occupation of Southeastern Europe.

Raičević was born in Tolac, Sanjak of Herzegovina, Ottoman Empire. He undertook commissions for the Patriarchate of Peć and went to Bosnia and Herzegovina to paint icons for the iconostasis in the Church of the Holy Archangels Michael and Gabriel in Sarajevo. He is noted for having painted Saint Nicholas in an abstract but traditional form. His icon is not influenced by Western art; St. Nicholas is presented in the Byzantine art style of the twelfth century and those that followed suit. All of his commissions came from the Patriarchate (Peć) or from high-ranking Serbian officials.

The Monastery of the Holy Trinity of Pljevlja, also known as Vrhobreznica, was the largest rewriting center (Scriptorium) in Montenegro during the period of Ottoman rule. In the monastic brotherhood of the Holy Trinity, some of the most important achievements of Serbian manuscript literature from the Ottoman era were created. John the Exarch's Hexameron (a 15th-century Russian translation) and Cosmas Indicopleustes's Christian topography, hand-copied by Gavrilo Trojičanin in 1649 and then illustrated by painter Andrija Raičević, were a remarkable and significant undertaking of miniature painting in the seventeenth century. Raičević was a relative of Mojsije, the abbot of the Monastery of the Holy Trinity. Over time, these two works in the same connection became especially recognizable by Raičević's extraordinary illustrations. Today, Andrija Raičević's works are on display in the Museum of the Serbian Orthodox Church and Heritage museum Pljevlja (Zavičajni muzej Pljevlja).

He died in Peć.

== See also ==
- Maksim Tujković
- Dimitrije Daskal
- List of painters from Serbia
- Serbian art
- Kyr Kozma (also known as Jovan of Hilandar)
- Zograf Radul
- Avesalom Vujičić
- Georgije Mitrofanović
- Pop Danilo
- Zograf Longin
- Lovro Dobričević
