= Munich Serbian Psalter =

14th-century illuminated psalter

- Munich, Bavarian State Library, Cod. slav. 4
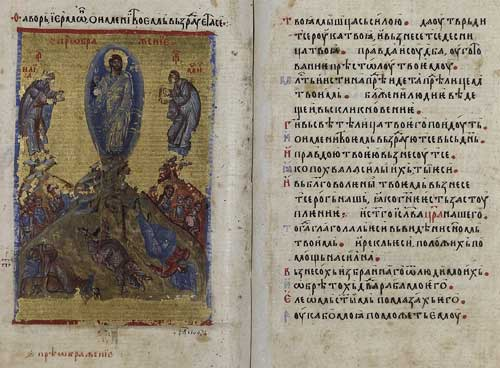
- Folios 116v and 117r. The miniature depicts the Transfiguration of Christ, illustrating Psalm 88:13, "Tabor and Hermon shall rejoice in thy name."
- Also known as: Serbian Psalter in Munich, Serbian Munich Psalter
- Type: Psalter
- Date: Late 14th century
- Place of origin: Moravian Serbia
- Language: Church Slavonic of the Serbian recension
- Patron: Lazar Hrebeljanović or Stefan Lazarević
- Material: Paper
- Size: 28 by 19.7 cm; 229 leaves
- Format: Quarto
- Script: Uncial Cyrillic
- Contents: The Psalms, the canticles, and the Akathist to the Theotokos
- Illumination: 148 miniatures
- Additions: Old inscriptions (folio 1r)
- Previously kept: Moravian Serbia and Serbian Despotate (14th–15th centuries); Privina Glava Monastery in Syrmia (17th century); Gotteszell Monastery in the Bavarian Forest (1689–1782); St Emmeram's Monastery, Regensburg (1782 – c. 1800)

The Munich Serbian Psalter (Serbian: Минхенски српски псалтир, romanized: Minhenski srpski psaltir, German: Serbischer Psalter) is a 14th-century illuminated psalter written in Church Slavonic of the Serbian recension. With its 229 leaves illustrated with 148 miniatures, it is regarded as the most extensively illuminated Serbian manuscript book. It was written after 1370 in Moravian Serbia, either for its ruler Prince Lazar, or more likely, for his successor Stefan Lazarević. The book was rebound in 1630 by Serbian Patriarch Pajsije. It was taken to Bavaria in the late 17th century, and has been kept in the Bavarian State Library in Munich (as MS Cod. slav. 4) since the beginning of the 19th century.

== Description ==
The Munich Serbian Psalter is a manuscript book written in Church Slavonic of the Serbian recension, in uncial Cyrillic script. It is a representative of the revised version of the Church Slavonic psalter text which came into use in the early 14th century. Compared with previous psalter texts, this version is a closer translation of the Greek original into Church Slavonic. Beside the Psalms, the manuscript also contains the canticles and the Akathist to the Theotokos. It is illustrated with 148 miniatures, which often occupy whole pages, and is regarded as the most extensively illuminated Serbian manuscript book. It has 229 paper leaves in the quarto format, now measuring 28 by 19.7 centimetres. The text columns measure 19 by 12 centimetres and the usual height of the letters is 4 to 5 millimetres; the columns written in such letters consist of 21 lines or, exceptionally, 22 lines. The miniatures' captions are written in red in half-uncial script, with letters smaller than those of the normal text. Some of the captions contain traits of the Serbian vernacular. The titles of the psalms are written in gold on a red background, and most of them include a comment indicating how the psalm is related to Christ and the New Testament. The recto of the first leaf (folio 1r) was originally left blank, but now it contains inscriptions which span several centuries.

The psalter's miniatures are painted on a gold ground, and they are framed by red and blue lines. The most numerous are those depicting events described in the Old Testament, with the focus on David. A second group of miniatures illustrate interpretations of the psalms as found in Church literature and religious novels, while scenes from the New Testament form a third group. A fourth group are the illustrations of the canticles and the akathist. Some psalms have no corresponding illustrations, while others have more than one. The quality of the miniatures lies more in their colouring than in their composition. By their iconography and style, they are related to paintings in Serbian churches created after 1350 during a period when there was no central, dominant art school in Serbia. This phase of Serbian art began during the reign of Serbian Emperor Stefan Uroš IV Dušan (r. 1331–1355). The miniatures show characteristics of various local schools, the most dominant of which are the school of the Matejče Monastery and the school of Metropolitan Jovan Zograf, both of which originated in the region of Skopje in northern Macedonia. The miniatures are the collective work of a group of painters belonging to those different schools.

The manuscript is not in its original binding, and the current one was made in 1630 in the Byzantine style. The front and back covers are made of two wooden boards. They have holes and grooves for the binding threads, with which the boards are laced together through the backs of the book's gatherings. The spine of the book consists of a strong linen or hemp cloth. Goatskin painted dark brown is glued onto the boards and the cloth, covering them completely on the outside; the inner sides of the boards are partially covered. Two leather straps are attached to the back cover, and the book is held closed by fastening the straps to two corresponding pins stuck in the front cover. Both covers are decorated with patterns stamped into the goatskin.

== History ==
There are no historical sources documenting where, when and for whom the Munich Serbian Psalter was created. A reliable piece of evidence used to determine its dating is the watermark impressed in the paper on which the manuscript was written (Briquet 3227). This watermark was in use between 1370 and 1390, and as the paper could have been used several years after its production, it can be estimated that the manuscript was written at some point between 1370 and 1395. The miniature illustrating the end of the last psalm (folio 185r) contains a heraldic design in the form of a red double-headed eagle. This was the coat of arms of Stefan Lazarević, who became the ruler of Moravian Serbia after his father Prince Lazar died in 1389 in the Battle of Kosovo fighting against the Ottomans. The same miniature also depicts two young princes, one dressed in red, and the other dressed in blue. A similar depiction is found in a fresco in the Ljubostinja Monastery in central Serbia, built at the end of the 14th century. In the fresco, the two princes are designated as Stefan Lazarević and his younger brother Vuk. These and some other data indicate that the Munich Serbian Psalter was created in Moravian Serbia for the Lazarević brothers around 1390. If, however, an earlier date is accepted, then the patron of the manuscript could have been Prince Lazar. Its illuminators hailed from a more southerly area of the former Serbian Empire, specifically northern Macedonia, but it is known that painters from this region worked in Moravian Serbia in the last decade of the 14th century.

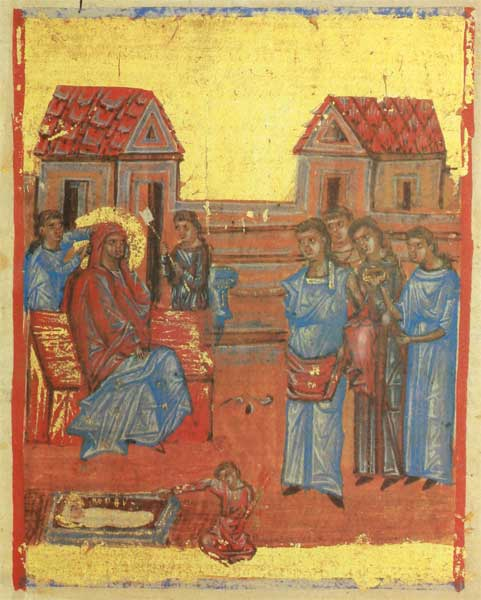
Miniature depicting the Nativity of Mary (folio 167r)

Stefan Lazarević became the Despot of Serbia in 1402, and he was succeeded by Đurađ Branković in 1427. A contemporary inscription on the recto of the first leaf of the psalter indicates that the book was part of Despot Đurađ's library, and that, at some point, he sent it to one of his sons. It is conjectured that the book might have been a wedding gift for his youngest son and successor, Lazar Branković, who married in 1446. The Serbian Despotate fell to the Ottomans in 1459, and the Branković family went into exile in Syrmia, then part of the Kingdom of Hungary. At the beginning of the 17th century, the psalter was in the Privina Glava Monastery on Mount Fruška Gora in Syrmia, which was then under Ottoman rule. In 1627, Serbian Patriarch Pajsije visited the monastery and took the manuscript to his library in Vrdnik, where it remained until 1630. During that time, a copy of the psalter was transcribed; the miniatures were also copied. The patriarch then rebound the book and returned it to Privina Glava. The copy, known as the Belgrade Psalter, would be later kept in the National Library of Serbia. It was destroyed along with the library by the German bombing of Belgrade in April 1941.

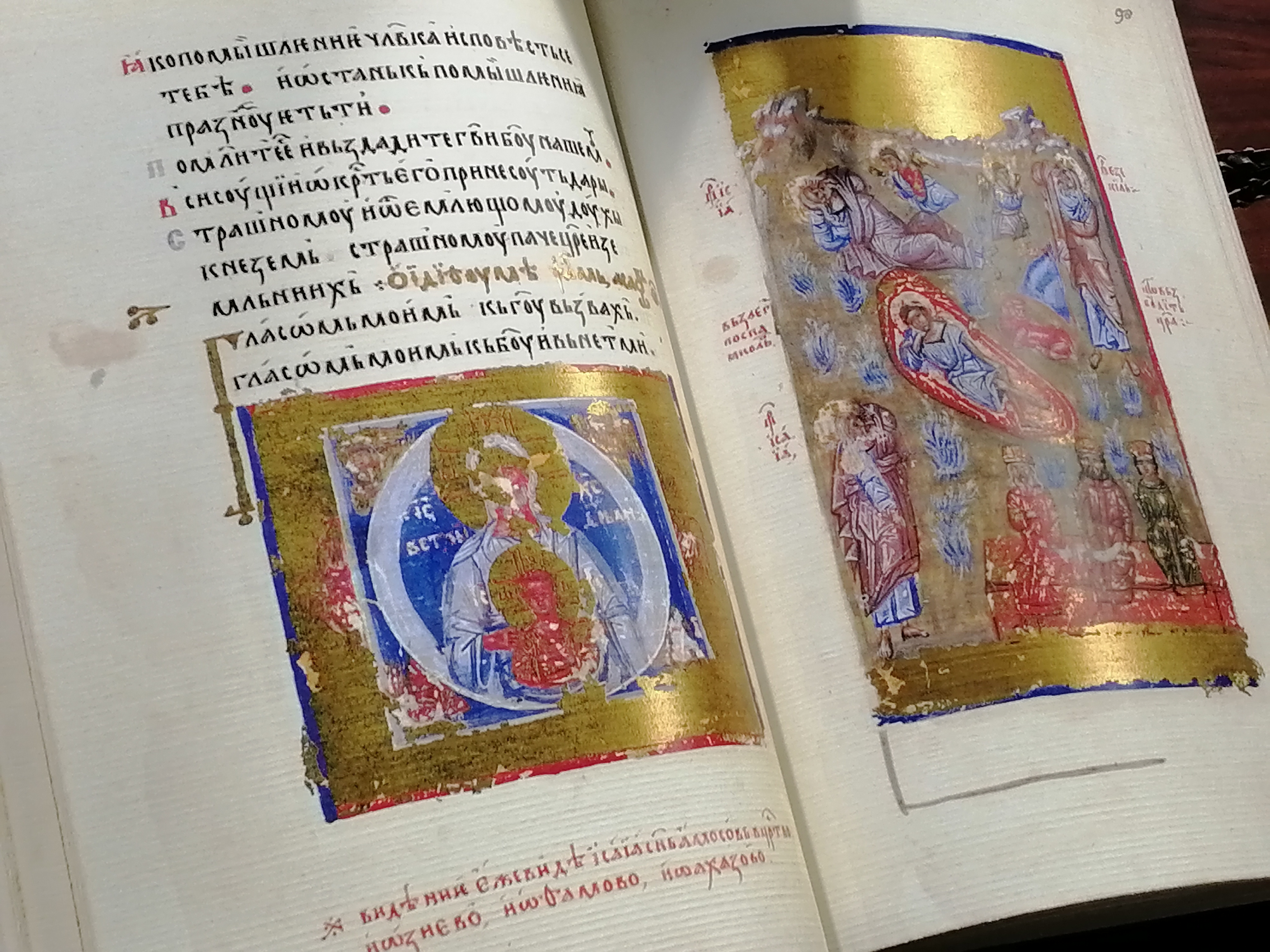

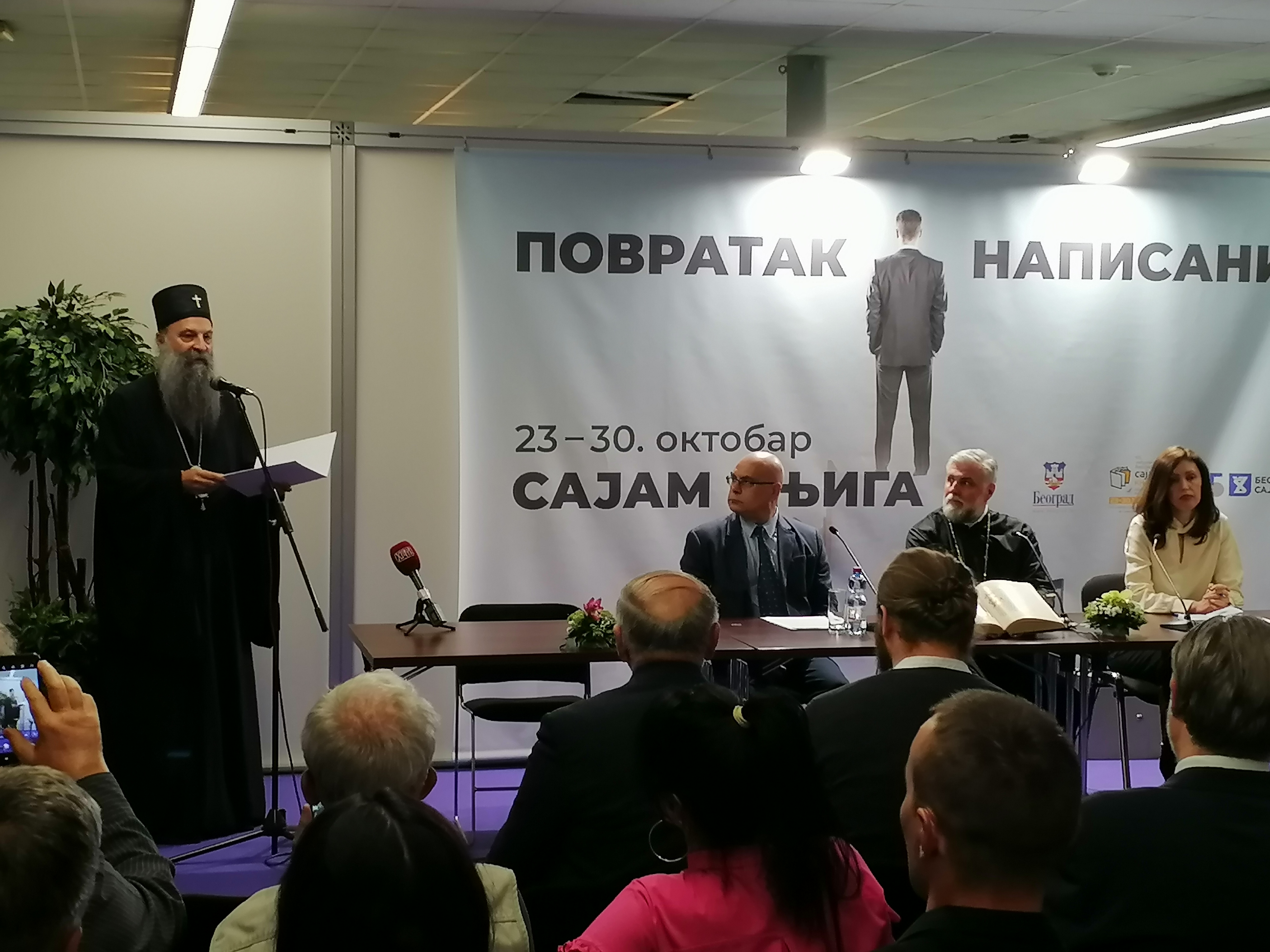

During the Great Turkish War, Bavarian troops under Maximilian II Emanuel fought in Syrmia against the Ottomans. The psalter came into the hands of one of Maximilian's high officers named Wolfgang Heinrich von Gemell zu Fischbach. In 1689, he gave the book to the Gotteszell Monastery in the Bavarian Forest, where it remained for almost a century. In an exchange of books, the Gotteszell monks gave the psalter to the Monastery of St. Emmeram in Regensburg in 1782. At the beginning of the 19th century, many valuable manuscripts were taken from monasteries to the Bavarian State Library in Munich, and this was also the case with the Serbian Psalter, which was given the shelf number Cod. slav. 4. It was regarded in Germany as a Russian manuscript until 1834, when Russian scholar Mikhail Kutorga established its Serbian provenance. A substantial monograph on the psalter was published in Vienna in 1906. A philological analysis of its text was provided by Vatroslav Jagić, a prominent scholar of Slavic Studies. The miniatures were described and analyzed by Josef Strzygowski, an internationally reputed member of the Vienna School of Art History. Another monograph on the psalter was published in 1978 in Wiesbaden, Germany. It includes a facsimile reproduction of the whole manuscript.

== See also ==
- Oxford Serbian Psalter
