= Gavrilo Trojičanin =

Serbian historiographer, scribe and monk

Gavrilo Trojičanin (c. 1600-after 1651) was a Serbian historiographer, a gifted scribe and the monk of the monastery of Svete Troice (Holy Trinity) at Vrhobreznica, near Pljevlja.

== Works ==
Through his transcript work, from 1633 to 1651, he displayed more talent than any other copyist of the period. He had an enviable education and was interested in almost every area of human knowledge and endeavor that was nurtured in the Middle Ages. In monasteries and libraries, he collected comparisons of old manuscripts, copied ritual books, and decorated them with illuminations. His Cyrillic manuscript is extensive and ten works (several thousand pages in length) have been preserved in libraries.

He also collaborated with artists of his time, namely Andrija Raičević and Jovan Kyr Kozma, during their stay in 1643 at the Monastery of the Holy Trinity of Pljevlja and hand-copied 6th-century traveler Cosmas Indicopleustes's Christian Topography.

In the Vrhobreznica Chronicle (Vrhbreznik letopis) of 1650, he codified old Serbian historiography, collecting together, in the new edition, the Serbian chronograph, genealogy, older yearbook, and junior yearbook. In summarizing Serbian historiography, it "symbolically marked the end of the medieval epoch", according to Serbian historian Dimitrije Bogdanović.

== Literature ==
- A translation of his work into modern Serbian - The Chronicle of the Border: An Ancient Book of 1650, edited by Vladeta Cvijović, Podgorica, Institute of History of Montenegro, 2000.
- Dimitrije Bogdanović: History of Old Serbian Literature, Belgrade, SKZ, 1980.
- Dejan Mihailović: The Byzantine Circle (Little Dictionary of Early Christian Literature in Greek, Byzantine and Old Serbian Literature), Belgrade, "Textbooks Institute", 2009, p. 38.
- Jelica Stojanovic: Writer Gavrilo Trojicin and the Spelling and Linguistic Characteristics of the "Vrhobreznik Chronicle", "Proceedings of the Scientific Conference: Scepan Polje and its Saints throughout the Ages" (Pluzine, September 24–25, 2006), *Berane: *Sveviđe - Monastery Zagrađe 2010, p. 159–170.
- Group of Authors: Historical Lexicon of Montenegro, Book 3 "Daily Press-News", 2006.

== See also ==
- Andrija Raičević
- List of painters from Serbia
