= Tronoša Chronicle =

1526 Serbian chronicle

Tronoša chronicle
- Also known as: Serbian Chronicle
- Date: 1791 (manuscript); 1526 (lost original)
- Place of origin: Tronoša monastery, Ottoman Empire
- Language: Serbian
- Author: Josif
- Script: Serbian Cyrillic
- Exemplars: Tronoša manuscript, held at Vienna, Austria; Serafim's copy

The Tronoša chronicle (Serbian: Троношки летопис; Троношки родослов) is a Serbian chronicle dating to 1526, transcribed by Orthodox hieromonk Josif Tronošac (Троношац) in 1791 at the Tronoša monastery near Loznica, in western Serbia. The Tronoša manuscript is the oldest survived copy, of which there are several transcriptions, one of them transcribed by Serafim. A copy is held at the monastery, while the original manuscript by Josif is held in Vienna.

The chronicle includes hagiographies of Serbian rulers. The Battle of Kosovo (1389) is described in the chronicle, probably based on the story about the battle transferred to the region north of Sava and Danube in the first half of the 18th century. According to tradition, as included in the chronicle, Prince Lazar of Serbia and his army had a holy communion before the battle at the church in Samodreža.

== See also ==
- Serbian chronicles
- Serbian manuscripts
