= Kalist Rasoder =

Kalist Rasoder was the author of the Tetraevangelion, also known as "Serres Gospel" book, written in 1354 in the Serbian recension of Church Slavonic. In view of the turbulent historical happenings in the region at the time, it is understandable how the Gospel book of Metropolitan Jakov of Serres found its way into the library of St. Paul's monastery (Agiou Pavlou) at Mount Athos, although the precise date of the transfer is unknown. The manuscript was brought to England in 1837 from the Athonite monastery of Agiou Pavlou, by Robert Curzon, 14th Baron Zouche. It was deposited at the British Museum by his son in 1876 and is kept in the British Library as Additional Manuscript 39626.

== See also ==
- Teodosije the Hilandarian (1246–1328), one of the most important Serbian writers in the Middle Ages
- Elder Grigorije (fl. 1310 – 1355), builder of Saint Archangels Monastery
- Antonije Bagaš (fl. 1356 – 1366), bought and restored the Agiou Pavlou monastery
- Lazar the Hilandarian (fl. 1404), the first known Serbian and Russian watchmaker
- Pachomius the Serb (fl. 1440s – 1484), hagiographer of the Russian Church
