= Georgije Mitrofanović =

Serbian monk

Georgije Mitrofanović (Serbian Cyrillic: Георгије Митрофановић; c. 1550–c. 1630) was a Serbian Orthodox monk and painter, remembered best for his work on the Morača monastery church and the frescoes (wall paintings) inside the Krupa monastery church. Mitrofanović, a monk, had trained at the Hilandar monastery workshop, situated on Mount Athos, before coming to Montenegro where he worked on frescoes in the Morača monastery. He had many pupils and associates, but his most famous follower was Zograf Jovan. His contemporary was Zograf Longin.

Serbian Patriarch Pajsije initiated the restoration of the old 13th- and 14th-century churches of the Patriarchal Monastery of Peć in 1620. Its restoration marked the symbolic beginning of the renaissance of true artistic activity in the territories subordinate to prikazes of the Serbian Patriarchate of Peć. All the domes of the churches were covered with lead, the Church of St. Demetrius was practically rebuilt, and almost half of the frescoes were restored by Mitrofanović, giving them a new layer. The major part of the early 17th-century frescoes in the church is found in the altar and in the space beneath the cupola. Retaining the old subjects and respecting the preceding compositional solutions, Mitrofanović tended to approach the artistic attitude of master painter John from the 14th century retaining at the same time his own warmer coloring.

== Work ==
- The icon of Saints Demetrius, George, Artemius and Procopius, at Hilandar Monastery, Mount Athos, Greece, 1618
- The fresco of Patriarch Jovan, 1619-1620
- The icon of Annunciation. Centre door of an iconostasis of Saint Tryphon Church in Hilandar Monastery, Mount Athos, Greece

== See also ==
- Maksim Tujković
- Dimitrije Daskal
- List of painters from Serbia
- Serbian art
- Kyr Kozma (also known as Jovan of Hilandar)
- Zograf Radul
- Andrija Raičević
- Zograf Longin
- Lovro Dobričević

== Annotations ==
1. His name is mostly spelt Georgije and Đorđe Mitrofanović (Ђорђе Митрофановић).
