= Church of St. Luke (Kotor) =

Church in Montenegro

Coordinates: 42°25′32″N 18°46′16″E

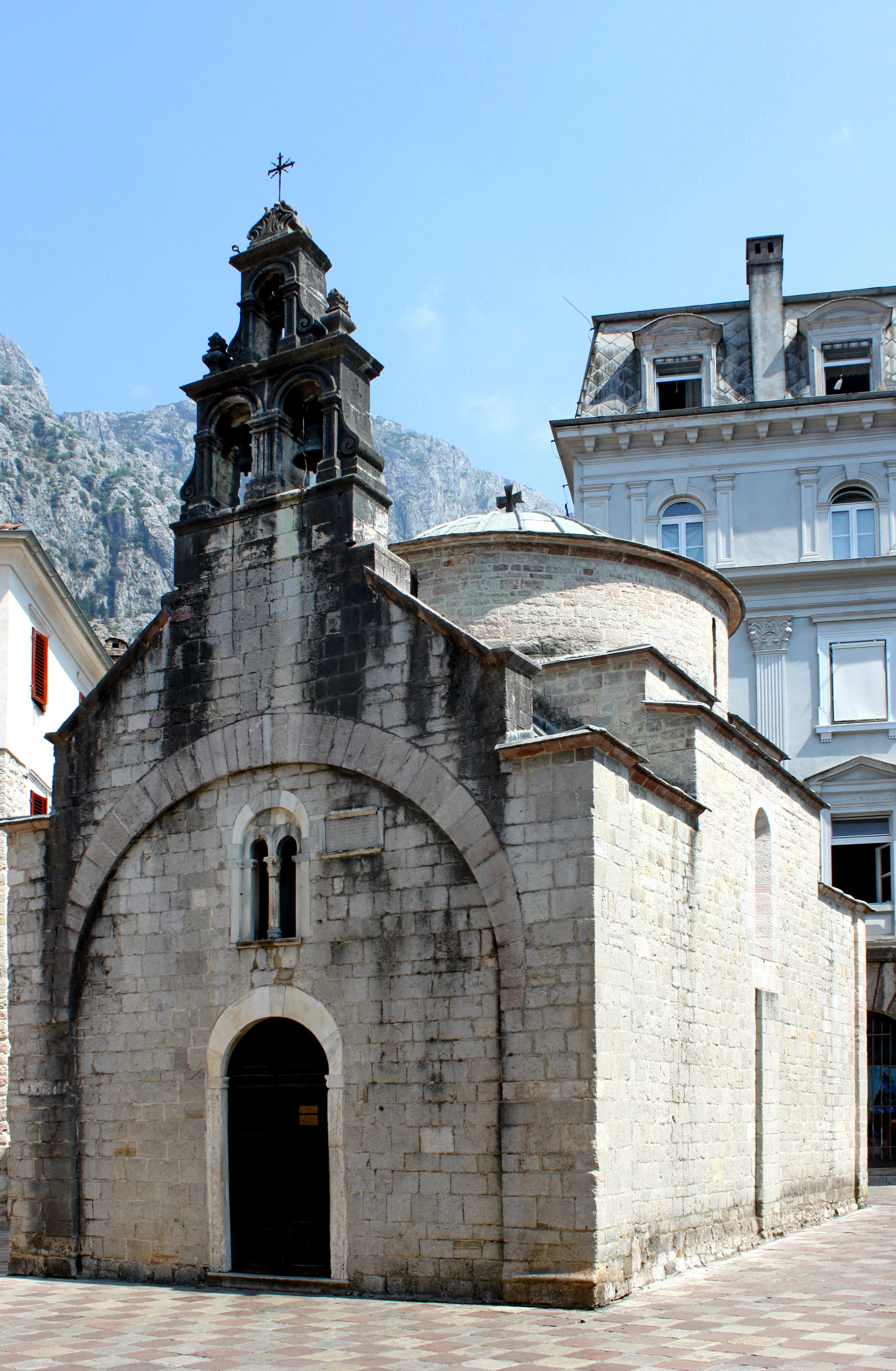
The church

The Church of St. Luke in Boka Kotorska, Montenegro (Serbian Cyrillic: Црква Светог Луке у Котору) belongs to the Serbian Orthodox Church. The Byzantine and Gothic architecture was built in 1195 during Stefan Nemanja's reign. In the 17th century, Dimitrije Daskal painted the icons of the iconostasis of the Church of Sveti Luka (in Serbian).

There is an older structure in same town, Kotor Cathedral that was built on the foundation of a ninth-century Christian church in 1166.
