= Life of Despot Stefan Lazarević =

c. 1431 Serbian biography

The Life of Despot Stefan Lazarević (Serbian: Живот деспота Стефана Лазаревића, Житије деспота Стефана Лазаревића / Život despota Stefana Lazarevića, Žitije despota Stefana Lazarevića) is a biography of Serbian ruler Stefan Lazarević authored by Constantine of Kostenets ("the Philosopher") c. 1431. The biography had been ordered by Serbian Patriarch Nikon following the death of Despot Stefan. That order was only fulfilled four years later, when allegedly Despot Stefan himself appeared in Constantine's dream. The biography is regarded as one of the most interesting in the medieval Serbian literature because it contains not only facts about the Despot's life, but also geographic information and thorough descriptions of numerous historical events. Constantine was apparently inspired by Byzantine chronicles. The work begins with a geographic description of Serbia's natural beauties, going on to describe its residents, praising their character but also mourning their forthcoming fall to the Turks. An exhaustive story of court events and Despot Stefan's life follows, with numerous Biblical and classical references and numerous historical data which have proven invaluable to later historians. On several occasions, Constantine used acrostics, with three masterpiece instances: in the introduction verses, in the titles of central chapters, and in the verses telling of his sorrow for the deceased.

== See also ==
- Life of Stefan Nemanja
- Life of St. Sava (by Domentijan)
- Life of St. Sava (by Teodosije)

== Sources ==
- Birnbaum, Henrik (1972). "Byzantine Tradition Transformed: The Old Serbian Vita". Aspects of the Balkans: Continuity and Change. The Hague and Paris: Mouton. pp. 243–284.
- Ćirković, Sima (2004). The Serbs. Malden: Blackwell Publishing. ISBN 9781405142915.
- Fine, John Van Antwerp Jr. (1994) [1987]. The Late Medieval Balkans: A Critical Survey from the Late Twelfth Century to the Ottoman Conquest. Ann Arbor, Michigan: University of Michigan Press. ISBN 0472082604.
- Grickat-Radulović, Irena (1993). "Serbian Medieval Literary Language". Serbs in European Civilization. Belgrade: Nova, Serbian Academy of Sciences and Arts, Institute for Balkan Studies. pp. 146–150. ISBN 9788675830153.
- Radošević, Ninoslava (1986). "Laudes Serbiae: The Life of Despot Stephan Lazarević by Constantine the Philosopher". Зборник радова Византолошког института (in French). 24–25: 445–451.
