= Dečani Chronicle =

Dečani chronicle
- Date: second half of the 15th century (original), 1595 (manuscript)
- Place of origin: Dečani monastery, Serbian Despotate
- Language: Serbian language

The Dečani chronicle (Serbian: Дечански летопис) is a Serbian-language manuscript written in the second half of the 15th century in the Dečani monastery.

== Transcription and publishing ==
During the transcription of the Dečani chronicle from the original manuscript, the transcriber not only transcribed it, but also interpreted the original text.

It was published by Serafim Ristić in his work Dečani Monuments. In 1908 its translation into Russian was published in Saint Petersburg by deacon Nikolai Mavrov.

== Content ==
The earliest mention of Ibarski Kolašin is in the 1595 register found in the Dečani chronicle which includes all of Kolašin's villages and their registered inhabitants. This chronicle explains the Serbian-language origin of the name of the town Šabac.

The Dečani chronicle discusses members of the Nemanjić dynasty, in particular Stefan Nemanja and some his descendants. It describes the death of Stefan Dečanski after he was first denigrated by his stepmother Simonida. The chronicle presents information about natural phenomena that accompanied Stefan's death, including the solar eclipse. The Dečani chronicle is one of four medieval chronicles which mention Simeon Uroš, the half-brother of Emperor Dušan, and his actions to temporarily seize the Serbian throne.

This chronicle mentions the Battle of Rovine of 1395 and explains that Prince Marko and Constantine Dragaš died in this battle. This chronicle also explains that Marko's brother, Andreja Mrnjavčević, died in the Battle of Rovine too. The Dečani chronicle describes how the Ottoman military commander Skanderbeg fled the battlefield in Momina Klisura in 1444, near modern-day Pazardzhik in Bulgaria, after being defeated by Serbian Despot Đurađ Branković.

== See also ==
- Serbian chronicles
- Serbian manuscripts
