= Jakov of Serres =

Serbian writer, scholar, translator and hierarch of the Serbian Orthodox Church

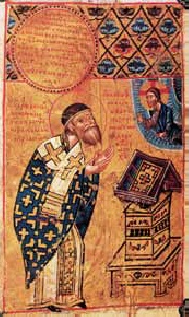
Illustration of Jakov of Serres from the 1354 Tetraevangelion.

Jakov of Serres (Serbian: Јаков Серски; 1300–1365) was a medieval Serbian writer, scholar, translator, and hierarch of the Serbian Orthodox Church, one of the most important men of letters working in the 14th century.

== Biography ==
Evidence about his life is scarce, but his literary legacy suggests an excellent knowledge of Greek and Slavic languages. In 1343, King (and eventually Emperor) Stefan Dušan began to build the Monastery of the Holy Archangels near Prizren; he appointed Jakov, a learned and highly esteemed monk, its first hegumen (abbot). Both Stefan Dušan and his wife Jelena were in awe of Jakov's wide knowledge and they often sought his company and counsel. In 1345, Stefan Dušan captured the city of Serres from the Byzantine Empire; and Jakov was appointed Metropolitan of Serres and its surrounding territories. The population of Serres was mixed Slavic, Albanian and Greek and Jakov was fluent in all three languages and their dialects. In fact, Jakov wrote some literature hymns in Greek and is numbered among the Greek authors as well as Serbian. Jakov was a disciple of Gregory of Sinai and a friend of Romylos of Ravanica.

After the sudden death of Stefan Dušan in 1355, Jelena, Dušan's wife, became a nun, took the name Jelisaveta, and moved from Skoplje, the capital of Serbia, to Serres. From there, she administered her estates; and Jakov was at her side as wise counsel. Jakov wrote the Triodion which he sent as his bequest to the Monastery of the Theotokos in Sinai in 1359 or 1360. At present, the Triodion (a two-part Triodion, one for Lent and the other for the period between Easter and Pentecost) is kept in Monastery of St. Catherine in Sinai. Copies are also kept at Hilandar Monastery, Mount Athos, Greece, and in libraries in the United Kingdom, Europe, and North America.

He is illustrated in the Serbian manuscript of scribe Kalist Rasoder's Tetraevangelion (The Four Gospels) dating to 1354, held at the British Library.

== See also ==
- Teodosije the Hilandarian (1246–1328), one of the most important Serbian writers in the Middle Ages
- Elder Grigorije (fl. 1310 – 1355), builder of Saint Archangels Monastery
- Antonije Bagaš (fl. 1356 – 1366), bought and restored the Agiou Pavlou monastery
- Lazar the Hilandarian (fl. 1404), the first known Serbian and Russian watchmaker
- Pachomius the Serb (fl. 1440s – 1484), hagiographer of the Russian Church
- Miroslav Gospel
- Gabriel the Hilandarian
