= Nikola Stanjević Gospel =

14th-century Serbian Orthodox gospel

- Created: mid-14th century
- Author: Monk Feoktist
- Purpose: Gospel

The Nikola Stanjević Gospel (Serbian: Јеванђеље Николе Стањевића, romanized: Jevanđelje Nikole Stanjevića) is an illuminated manuscript Gospel Book in Old Serbian (Rascian). It was donated to the Hilandar monastery of Mount Athos by Serbian Imperial Military commander Nikola Stanjević. The decorations of the manuscript show a diversity of styles which makes this manuscript special. Its author is a monk by the name of Feoktist.
