= Nikola Stanjević =

14th-century magnate who served Stefan Dušan

Nikola Stanjević (Serbian Cyrillic: Никола Стањевић, fl. 1355–1366) was a magnate who served Emperor Stefan Dušan (r. 1331–55) as veliki vojvoda (general), and who was still alive during the rule of Emperor Uroš V (r. 1355–71), when in 1366 the Emperor confirmed the metochion of his endowment, the Konče Church, dedicated to St. Stephen, near Radovište, to the Hilandar monastery. He held a province in northern Macedonia, around Skopje. He is an ancestor of Nikola Pavlović "Gefalija" and the Stanjević brotherhood in Montenegro. He is the founder of the Stanjevići Monastery on the southern slopes of Mount Lovćen, overlooking Budva.

== Gospel ==
Nikola had a gospel book written and illustrated by monk Feoktist, which he donated to the Hilandar monastery of Mount Athos. The book is now called the "Tetravangelion of Nikola Stanjević", found in London at the British Museum, collection No. 154.

Military offices
Vacant Title last held by Novak Grebostrek	veliki vojvoda of Stefan Dušan ?–1355; Served alongside: Jovan Oliver	Succeeded by Jovan Uglješa as veliki vojvoda of Uroš V

== See also ==
- Teodosije the Hilandarian (1246–1328), one of the most important Serbian writers in the Middle Ages
- Elder Grigorije (fl. 1310–1355), builder of Saint Archangels Monastery
- Antonije Bagaš (fl. 1356–1366), bought and restored the Agiou Pavlou monastery
- Lazar the Hilandarian (fl. 1404), the first known Serbian and Russian watchmaker
- Pachomius the Serb (fl. 1440s–1484), hagiographer of the Russian Church
- Miroslav Gospel
- Gabriel the Hilandarian
- Constantine of Kostenets
- Cyprian, Metropolitan of Kiev and All Rus'
- Gregory Tsamblak
- Isaija the Monk

== Sources ==
- Ćorović, Vladimir (2001), Istorija srpskog naroda (in Serbian) (Internet ed.), Belgrade: Ars Libri
- Fajfrić, Željko (2000) [1998], Sveta loza Stefana Nemanje (in Serbian), Belgrade: "Tehnologije, izdavastvo, agencija Janus", "Rastko".
