= Stanjevići Monastery =

Serbian Orthodox monastery near Budva, Montenegro

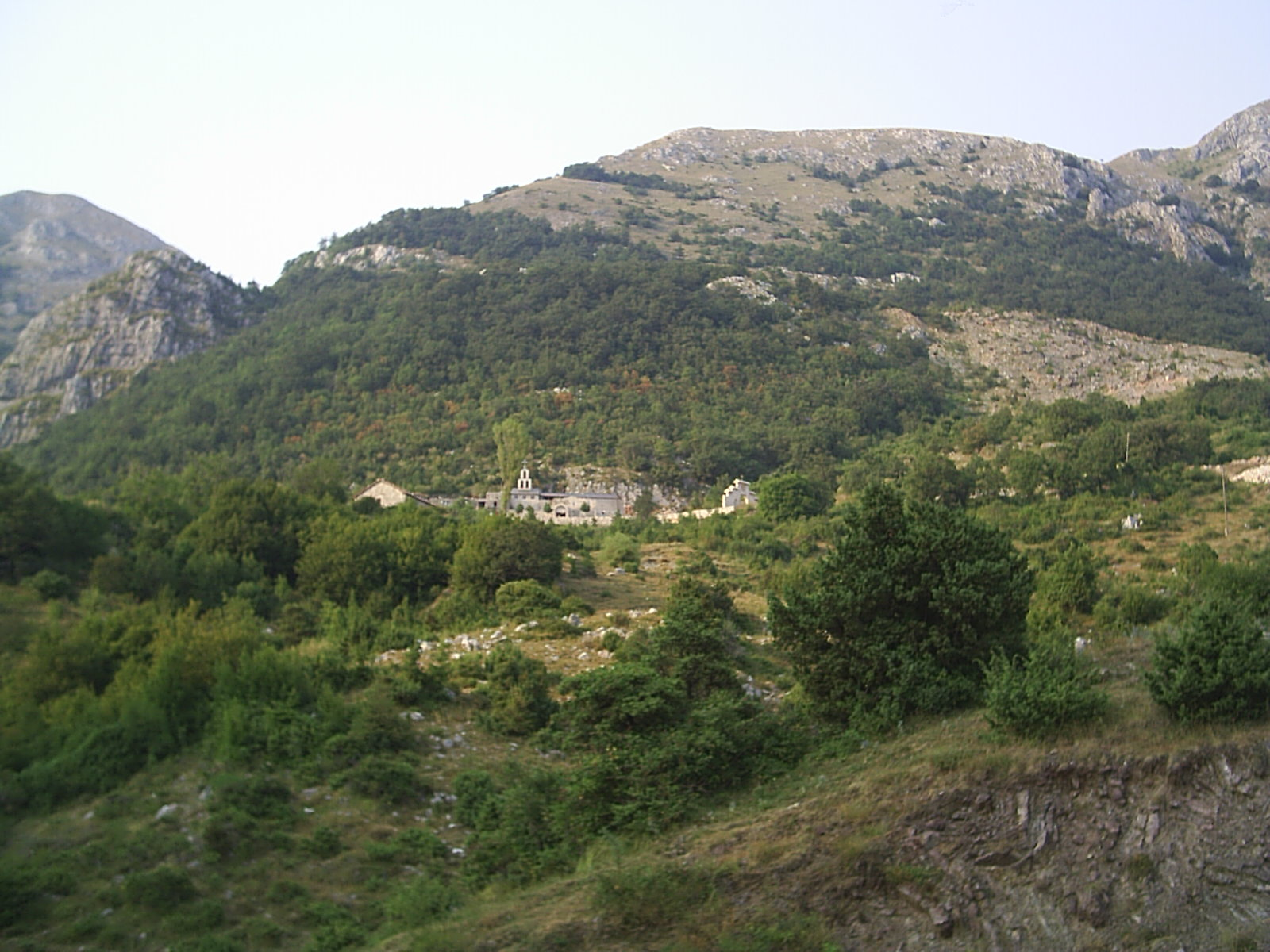
- Interactive map of the Stanjevići Monastery area

General information
- Type: monastery
- Location: north of Budva, Montenegro
- Coordinates: 42°20′06″N 18°49′49″E

The Stanjevići Monastery (Serbian: Манастир Стањевићи, romanized: Manastir Stanjevići) is located north of the town of Budva, Montenegro. Founded by Nikola Stanjević, the monastery is remembered as the Prince-Bishopric of Montenegro and the place where the praviteljstvo suda (judicial administration) and zakonik (legal code) for Montenegro and the Brda was promulgated and enacted in 1798 by 50 members of the council and Vladika Petar I Petrović-Njegoš. It is also considered the cultural centre of the Paštrovići.

== See also ==
- List of Serbian monasteries
