= Karlovački rodoslov =

- Also known as: Karlovački letopis
- Date: 1418 — 1427
- Language: Serbian
- Material: Paper
- Script: Serbian Cyrillic
- Previously kept: Eparchy of upper Karlovac
- Discovered: In Karlovac, Croatia

Karlovački rodoslov (Serbian Cyrillic: Карловачки родослов, German: Genealogie von Karlovac), compiled between 1418 and 1427, is a manuscript "which does not only include myths and legends, but also historical facts". It was found at Karlovac, in Croatia, hence its name. It was studied by Pavel Jozef Šafárik (1795–1861), in the scientific work with the title "Short history on the Serbian Emperors" (Истоpиja кратка о српским царевима).

It includes Nemanjić dynasty history, and the Battle of Kosovo. It also includes claims of Serbian antiquity, such as "All Serbs worshipped Dagon, from where the Dagoni and Dacians derived their name" (и вса Србска идолу служаше Дагону, от суду и Дагони и Даки именујет се), that the Serbs derived their name from Ser (от Сера же Србље), and Emperor Licinius was referred to as a "Dalmatian lord, Serb by birth" (далматински господин, родом Србин). According to it, the "Great Emperor" Constantine I employed Licinus, "the Serb Emperor", whom he "gave his sister to wed". It then claims that Stefan Nemanja, the Serbian Grand Prince, was the great-grandson of Licinus.

== See also ==
- Vrhobreznica Manuscript, 1650
- Konstantin's Manuscript
- Pajsije's Manuscript
- Ruvarac's Manuscript
