= Cetinje chronicle =

Ancient manuscripts collection

Cetinje chronicle (Cetinjski ljetopis)
- Cetinje monastery
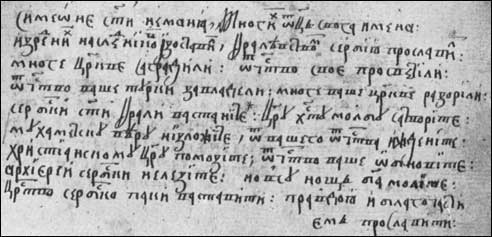
- "Ode to Nemanja", by bishop Vasilije Petrović, inscription in the Cetinje Chronicle
- Also known as: Montenegrin Chronicle
- Type: Charter
- Place of origin: Serbian monasteries in the Zeta Plain
- Language: Serbian recension of Church Slavonic
- Author: Unknown
- Compiled by: Vasilije Petrović
- Size: 32 cm x 21.5 cm
- Script: Serbian Cyrillic
- Additions: by Vasilije Petrović

The Cetinje Chronicle (Serbian: Цетињски љетопис/Cetinjski ljetopis) is a collection of manuscripts (letters, documents, reports and poems) compiled by Vasilije Petrović who added some of his own writings to it. It contains 81 leaves of dimensions 32 cm x 21,5 cm. It is kept in Cetinje monastery. There are other versions of this collection (in Odessa, St Petersburg, &c.) which are not identical to the original because the original texts were transcribed by different people at different times. The first scholar who used this chronicle as source for his works was Vasilije Petrović who used it for his work on history of Montenegro, published in Moscow in 1754.

´There are several preserved transcriptions of this manuscript collection. The original is kept in Cetinje monastery. One version was given in 1830 by Njegoš to Polish collector Kucharski. After Kucharski's death it was purchased by Odessa University.

== Name ==
The name of the book which is written on its covers is Крусоволь. Until the end of the 19th century, it was referred to as the "Montenegrin Chronicle" (Crnogorski ljetopis) or "Crnojević's Chrysobull" (Krusovolj Crnojevića). Because it is kept in the Cetinje monastery, built by Ivan Crnojević in 1484, it is referred to as the "Cetinje chronicle".

== Background ==
After Ottoman Empire captured Skadar in 1479 Ivan Crnojević moved his court from easily accessible Zeta Plain to the mountains where he built his court (1482) and Cetinje monastery (1484). Remarkable collection of manuscripts was taken to the new court and monastery during the exodus from the churches in the plain. At the end of 15th century Cetinje monastery became an important center for collecting and transcription of old charters and other books. The Cetinje chronicle is a longer and supplemented version of the Studenica Chronicle (Studenički letopis), written in 2nd quarter of the 15th century.

== Content ==
=== Ode to Nemanja ===
O Simeon, the sainted Nemanja,

Father of numerous kin, You left fine heirs Who glorified Serbia with kingdom, Many churches they built, Their fatherland enlightened. The Turks conquered your fatherland, Many of our churches destroyed. Holy Serb kings arise, Say a prayer to Christ the King, Strike down the Mohammedan faith, Expel it from your fatherland! Help the Christian Emperor, Revive your fatherland! Serb bishops, do not rest, But pray to God all night long The Empire of the Serbs to restore

To glorify it with justice and blessing!

=== Biography of Skanderbeg ===
The first manuscript in the chronicle is the biography of Skanderbeg, which is the major part of the chronicle. It is translation of Barleti's work on Skanderbeg which is shortened either during translation or during transcription performed by Vasilije. A note at the end of this transcription says that the author of the text is "Marin from Shkodër of Slavic origin" (Марин Скадранин, родом Словен/Marin Skadarski, rodom Sloven).

=== Other documents and writings ===
Cetinje chronicle also contains charters and other documents transcribed by Vasilije III Petrović-Njegoš (in whole or partially) and issued by various rulers of Montenegro.

It contains the charter of Stefan the First-Crowned from 1212 in which he presents a list of churches he built in Kotor and Prevlaka. Cetinje Chronicle also contains the charter of Ivan Crnojević of 1485 in which he recorded his donation of land and property to the Cetinje Monastery.

A transcript of 1485 Golden bull of Ivan Crnojević by which he established the Cetinje Monastery is part of the Cetinje chronicle.

Vasilije wrote a note within this chronicle which describes the Battle at Carev Laz in 1712.

== See also ==
- Crnojević printing house

== Sources ==
- Martinović, Niko S. (1962), Cetinjski ljetopis [Cetinje chronicle] (in Serbian), Cetinje: Izd. Centr. nar. biblioteke NR Crne Gore, OCLC 7185102, archived from the original on 4 November 2013
