= Zograf Radul =

Zograf Radul (also simply Radul, c. 1630 - c. 1690) was a Serbian archpriest, writer, painter, and woodcarver. Such a combination for that period was not uncommon. According to art historians, Radul was influenced by Kyr Kozma. He was a contemporary of Kyr Kozma and Avesalom Vujičić, another Serbian icon painter who lived and worked at the same period. His student was Dimitrije Daskal.

Radul was a painter of the Serbian Patriarchate of Peć at the time of Patriarch Maksim I. He mainly painted altarpieces but was also active as a portrait painter.

His creations can be traced from 1665 to the Deesis in the church monastery in Crna Reka and from 1671 in the early 14th century Church of Saint John, in the isolated Serb village of Crkolez in the now disputed Serbian province of Kosovo), and the icons in the Church of Saint Nicholas in the Serbian Patriarchate of Peć while his writings are ensconced in the archives of the church of the Holy Trinity in the Praskvica Monastery (1681) in the Serbian Orthodox Metropolitanate of Montenegro and the Montenegrin Littoral.

Radul's most important works are the icons he painted in the period from 1673 to 1677 when he was commissioned by Patriarch Maksim (1655–1674) for the Church of St. Nicholas in Peć, and the Church of the Holy Archangels in Sarajevo.

== See also ==
- List of painters from Serbia
- Zograf Longin
- Serbian art
- Avesalom Vujičić
- Kyr Kozma (also known as Jovan of Hilandar)
- Andrija Raičević
- Georgije Mitrofanović
- Lovro Dobričević
- Pop Danilo
