= Dragolj Code =

1259 Serbian Orthodox manuscript

- Original title: Зборник попа Драгоља
- Created: 1259
- Location: National Library of Serbia
- Author(s): Dragolj

Dragolj Code or Miscellany by Dragolj (Serbian: Зборник попа Драгоља, romanized: Zbornik popa Dragolja) is a 1259 Serbian Orthodox manuscript by Serbian priest Dragolj (Presbyter Vasilije). It is written in the Old Serbian with characteristics of Zeta and Hum dialects. The code contains the "Adaptation of Kozma`s Sermon against Bogomils".

It was found in 1875 by a P. Srećković in a Serbian village in Albania kept by seventeen generations of the Serbian Orthodox priests from the same family. In 1902, the manuscript was obtained by the Ministry of Education for the National Library of Serbia. It disappeared during evacuation and retreat of the Serbian Army in the World War I in 1915. It was returned with the 13th-century Belgrade Prophetologion to the National Library after being purchased from the Federal Republic of Germany in 1969.

== See also ==
- List of medieval Serbian literature
