= Oxford Serbian Psalter =

Manuscript

- Oxford, Bodleian Library, MS e Mus. 184
- Type: Psalter
- Date: Late 14th century
- Language: Church Slavonic of the Serbian recension
- Material: Parchment
- Size: 219 leaves
- Script: Cyrillic
- Illumination: none

The Oxford Serbian Psalter is a manuscript psalter written on parchment in the late 14th century in Church Slavonic of the Serbian recension. It is well preserved, missing only one leaf, which contained Psalm 118:108–21, and now it has 219 leaves. Practically devoid of illuminations, it is written "in a hand which is clear and careful but not elegant".

The Oxford Serbian Psalter is a representative of the revised version of the Church Slavonic psalter text which came into use in the early 14th century. Compared with the previous psalter texts, this version is a closer translation of the Greek original into Church Slavonic. The text of the manuscript was corrected in a number of places, and some of the erased words are still partly legible. They have been shown to be readings of the older version. There are also five such readings which were left uncorrected. The scribe who wrote the manuscript also made the corrections. Some readings coincide with those of the Russian redaction of the psalter text.

The Bodleian Library in Oxford received the Serbian psalter in 1688 from Thomas Smith, Fellow of Magdalen College, Oxford. It is unknown when and where Smith acquired the manuscript. He was an Anglican clergyman and one of the Non-Jurors, who sought at the end of the 17th century to unite the Anglican and the Eastern Orthodox Church.

== See also ==
- Munich Serbian Psalter
