= Zograf Longin =

16th century Serbian icon painter

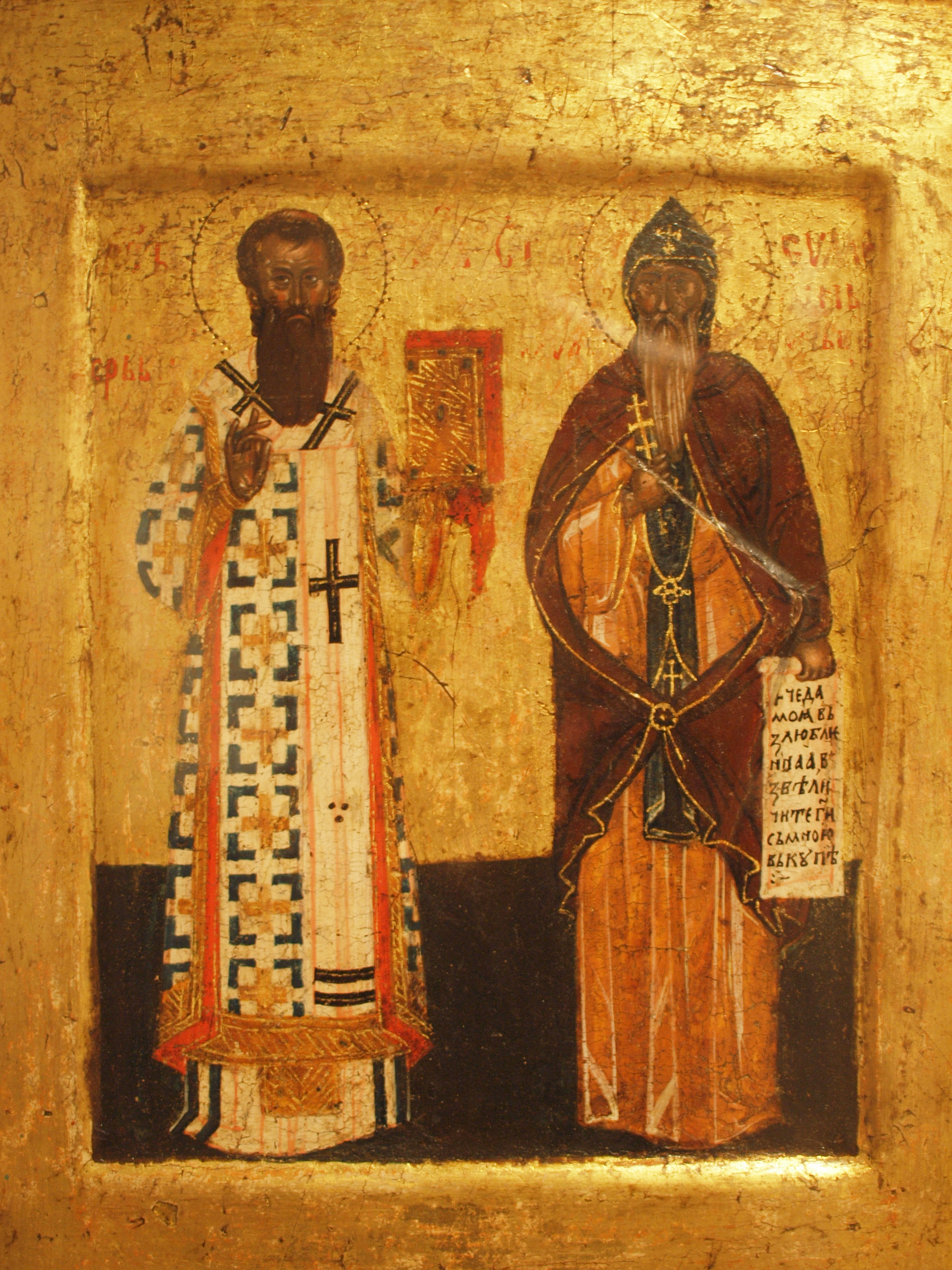
St Sava and St Symeon by Zograf Longin

Zograf Longin is considered the most significant Serbian icon painter of the 16th century. He was also a translator and writer. He was first a layman and later a monk in the monasteries of Peć and Sopoćani. His workplace was the monastery Visoki Dečani where he worked from 1563 to 1597. His icons and frescoes in the monasteries of Peć, Visoki Dečani, Piva Monastery, Velika Hoča, Lovnica, and the village churches Crkolez and Sveti Nikola at Bijelo Polje are preserved.

Zograf Longin's ascetic style is strongly committed to lyrical role models. His characters are serious, drawn out and follow styles of Serbian painting of the 14th century.

His icons include the "Saint Sava and Simeon" at National Museum of Serbia, the "Stefan Uroš IV Dečanski" in the Visoki Dečani Monastery, and the "Our Lady with Christ" in the Lovnica Monastery, his most famous icon. The icon is painted on a gold ground with a harmonious choice of colors in green, blue, cinnabar, red and ocher. This icon was presented with compositions of Serbian masters of the Baroque as well as Paja Jovanović in the Serbian Pavilion at the World Exhibition in Paris 1900.

== See also ==
- Georgije Mitrofanović
- Maksim Tujković
- List of painters from Serbia
- Serbian art
- Kyr Kozma (also known as Jovan of Hilandar)
- Zograf Radul
- Andrija Raičević
- Avesalom Vujičić
- Georgije Mitrofanović
- Pop Danilo
- Lovro Dobričević
