= Belgrade Prophetologion =

13th-century Serbian Orthodox lectionary of the Old Testament

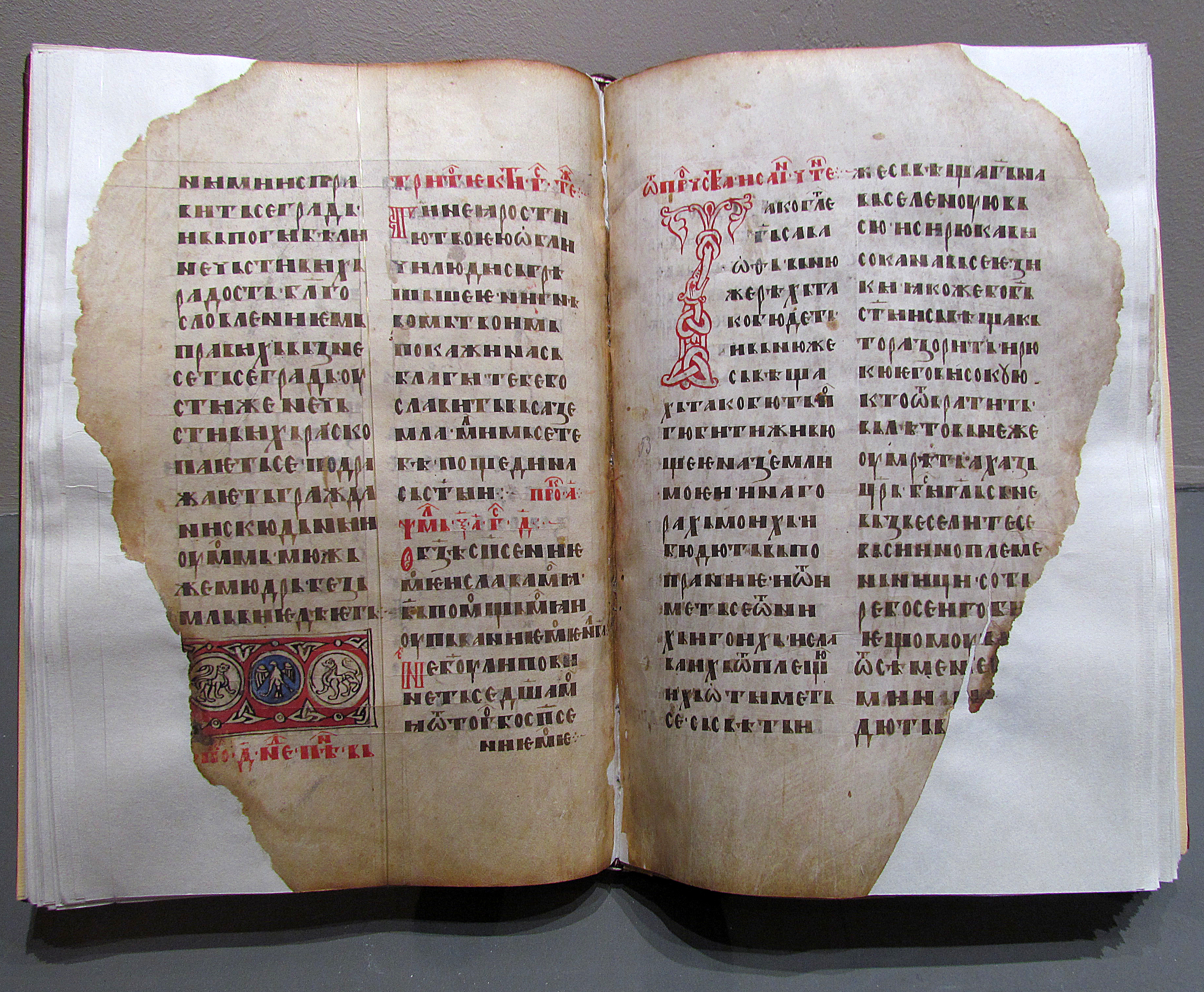
- Created: 13th century
- Location: National Library of Serbia
- Purpose: Prophetologion

Belgrade Prophetologion or Parimejnik (Serbian: Београдски паримејник, romanized: Beogradski parimejnik) is an early 13th-century Serbian Orthodox Prophetologion (Old Testament lectionary). of an unknown scribe.

It is written in Old Serbian (Old Church Slavonic) with mainly Rascian orthography and some orthographic features connecting it to Zeta and Hum manuscripts and Macedonian antecedents. Only fragments of this paroimoia have been preserved. It disappeared during evacuation and retreat of the Serbian Army in the Balkan Wars in 1915. It was returned to the National Library of Serbia collection after being purchased from the Federal Republic of Germany in 1969.

== See also ==
- List of medieval Serbian literature
