= Life of St. Sava (by Domentijan) =

1254 Serbian hagiography

The Life of St. Sava
- Also known as: Hagiography of St. Sava
- Type: hagiography
- Date: 1243–54
- Place of origin: Kingdom of Serbia
- Language: Old Serbian
- Scribe: Domentijan
- Dedicated to: Saint Sava

The Life of St. Sava (Serbian: Žitije Svetog Save/Житије Светог Саве) was the biography of Saint Sava (1169–1236), the first Archbishop of Serbs (s. 1219–1235), written by Serbian monk Domentijan (1210–after 1264) in 1254. Serbian monk Teodosije the Hilandarian wrote a second biography of Saint Sava.

== See also ==
- List of medieval Serbian literature
