= Vrhobreznica Chronicle =

1650 Serbian text

Vrhobreznica Chronicle Врхобрезнички Љетопис
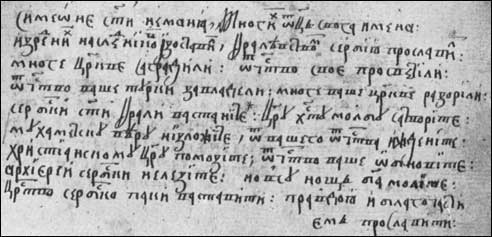
- Also known as: Врхобрезнички Љетопис
- Type: Chronicle
- Date: 1650
- Place of origin: Pljevlja
- Language(s): Serbian
- Author(s): Gavrilo Trojičanin
- Material: Paper
- Script: Serbian Cyrillic
- Previously kept: Monastery of the Holy Trinity of Pljevlja
- Discovered: In Pljevlja, Montenegro by Pavel Jozef Šafárik

The Vrhobreznica Chronicle (Serbian: Врхобрезнички љетопис) is a Serbian chronicle of which the oldest manuscript dates to 1650, from the Monastery of the Holy Trinity of Pljevlja. It is preserved in the collection of the Prague National Museum. The original texts, such as those of Koporin, Peć, Studenica and Cetinje, originated in the second half of the 14th century, and represent the oldest Serbian chronicles and the core of the medieval historiography of Serbia.

== Presumed influence from a 14th-century lost chronicle ==
The 14th-century abounds in translations by unknown persons, which were called "chronicles," actually a number of separate but similar manuscripts, stemming from an original historic source that does not survive but is assumed to have been written by the credited author.

== See also ==
- Serbian chronicles
