= Danilo's student =

Serbian medieval writer

Danilo's student (Serbian: Данилов ученик; 14th century) or Danilo's pupil was an anonymous Serbian medieval writer. Researchers were unable to find out either his worldly nor monastic name. All that is known that at the court of Archbishop Danilo II he was "fed, loved and taught". He wrote the biography of Danilo II between 1337 and 1340.

== Life ==
He belonged to a small circle of associates of Stefan Dušan, who after the death of Danilo II, Serbian Archbishop in 1337, the logothete (chancellor) was appointed as archbishop and thus tried to put the Serbian church under his stronger influence.

Professing anonymity was not uncommon for monks in medieval Serbia. Names of some monk scribes are difficult to come by because of their dedication to their craft of writing and because their spirituality did not permit them to disclose their name or take any credit for their work. Some would only give their first name, and occasionally some, like those from the Rača monastery, used the name of their monastery as a surname.

== Literary work ==
Danilo's student wrote three biographies: his mentor "Danilo", "The Life of the King Stefan Dečanski and "The Life of King Dušan the Mighty" only until the time of the collection "Lives of Kings and Archbishops" (1337–1340) and Žitije archiepiscopal Danilo II, Serbian Archbishop.

He wrote along the same lines as Danilo II, describing the life of his teacher after 1337, and presenting only the spiritual life and ecclesiastical calling of his master.

His works have been noted for their artistic and stylistic qualities. His writing has been described as dramatic and vivid. He was unable to completely avoid the stock phrases and epithets common in hagiographic literature of the time, however, the realistic detail in his works is unusually abundant for the period. In addition, "The Lives of Serbian Kings and Archbishops" (Животи краљева и архиепископа српских) .is a source on political and religious life in Serbia during the Nemanjić period.

His account of the Catalan attack on the monasteries of Mount Athos provides a contemporary description of the event.

It is assumed that from the biographies compiled by Archbishop Danilo and from his own, which he wrote according to the same pattern between 1337 and 1340, he made a whole, the collection "Lives of Serbian Kings and Archbishops" (the so-called "Danilo's Collection"). His narration is chronic, focused on external events (eg the description of the defence of Hilandar; the description of the battle of Velbužde), which goes beyond the old poetics of presenting internal spiritual values and linguistic and stylistic ups and downs.

He is credited with compiling the biographies written by Danilo II in a collection, and he added his biography of Stefan Uroš III and the "Life of Archbishop Joanikije I", written by a monk from the Monastery of Sopoćani.

Translation into modern Serbian

- Danilo's followers. Danilo's student, other followers of Danilo's collection. Edited by Gordon Mak Danijel, today's language version Lazar Mirković, Belgrade, Prosveta, SKZ, 1989, Stara srpska književnost u 24 knjige, knj. 7.

== Literature ==
- С. Novaković: "Narodna tradicija i kritička istorija", Otađbina 1880, knj. - {V} -, no. 17;
- И. Pavlović: Literary works of Archbishop Danilo - {II} - , Belgrade 1888:
- L J. Stojanović: "Lives of Serbian Kings and Archbishops and by Archbishop Danilo and Others" Glas SA, 1923, - {CVI} -;
- Text by George Sp. Radojičić in: Enciklopedija Jugoslavije , Zagreb, JLZ, 1984, volume - {III} -, p. 383.
- Н. Radojčić: "On Archbishop Danilo - {II} - and his successors" (foreword translated by L. Mirković: The Life of Serbian Kings and Archbishops). Belgrade 1935, p. - {V – XXIX} -;
- М. Kašanin: "Danilo's Continuator, Serbian Literature in the Middle Ages", Belgrade 1975, p. 234–252;
- Dimitrije Bogdanović: "History of Old Serbian Literature", Belgrade, SKZ, 1980.
