= Charter of Ravanica =

Founding charter of the Ravanica monastery in Belgrade, issued in 1381

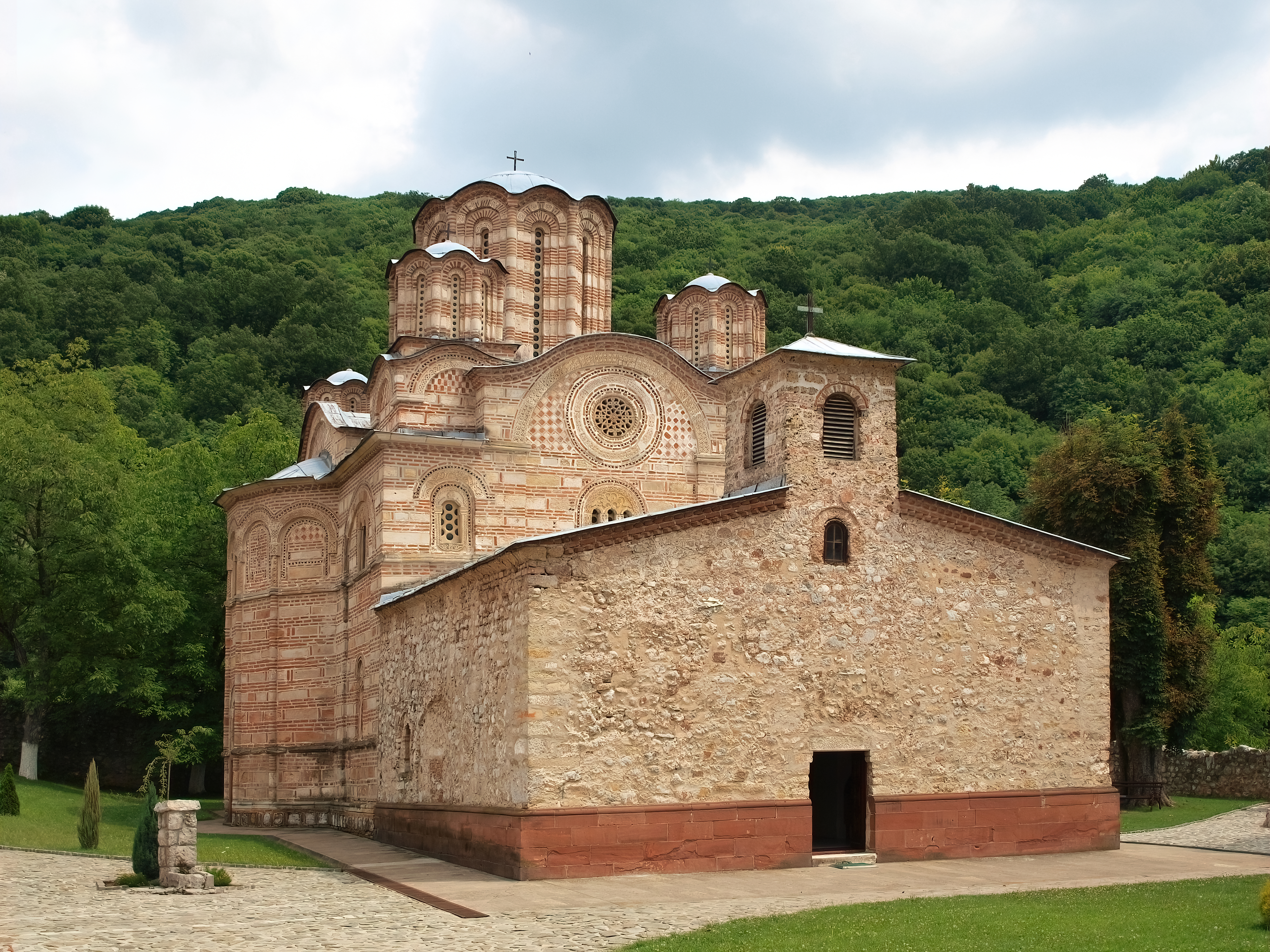
- Ravanica monastery
- Original title: Раваничка повеља
- Created: 1381
- Location: Museum of the Serbian Orthodox Church, Belgrade
- Signatories: Lazar of Serbia
- Purpose: Charter

The Charter of Ravanica (Serbian: Раваничка повеља, romanized: Ravanička povelja) was the founding charter of the Ravanica monastery, the main endowment (ktetor), and burial place of Prince Lazar of Serbia (r. 1371-1389), issued in 1381.

The Ravanica charter is not preserved in original, however, there is a well preserved copy of the Vrdnik transcript of the 17th century. The text of the charter is written in a fine dark colour, and the capital letters are in green, with a red surrounding. In the upper central part of the charter there is a depiction of Jesus Christ, and beside him, two angels. The image of Jesus is intertwined with vines of bright colours. On the charter is a silver stamp with gold platings on which the figure of Prince Lazar is on one side, and Jesus Christ on the throne on the other side. The charter is exhibited at the Museum of the Serbian Orthodox Church in Belgrade (Ed. MS 196–200). The Bologna transcript (which hasn't been published in full) signed by Patriarch Ephraim (t. 1375–1380, 1389–1390), is the second transcription preserved of the original.

According to the Vrdnik transcript, the charter dates from 1381, and according to the Bologna transcript, Ravanica dates from 1376/1377.

== See also ==
- List of medieval Serbian literature

== Sources ==
- Project Rastko, "Раваничка повеља кнеза Лазара из 1381. године"
- Barišić, F. (1974) O poveljama kneza Lazara i patrijarha Spiridona. Zbornik Filozofskog fakulteta, XII-1
- Ćirković, S.M. (1981) Ravanička hrisovulja. u: Manastir Ravanica 1381–1981, Spomenica o šestoj stogodišnjici, Beograd
- Mirjana Ćorović-Ljubinković, Ravanica, "Jugoslavija", 1966
