= Life of St. Sava (by Teodosije) =

c. 1300 Serbian hagiography

The Life of St. Sava
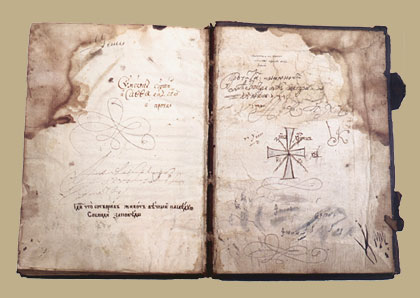
- 1739 transcript
- Also known as: Hagiography of St. Sava
- Type: hagiography
- Date: 1292–1300
- Place of origin: Kingdom of Serbia
- Language: Old Serbian
- Scribe: Teodosije the Hilandarian
- Dedicated to: Saint Sava

The Life of St. Sava (Serbian: Žitije Svetog Save/Житије Светог Саве) was the second biography of Saint Sava (1169–1236), the first Archbishop of Serbs (s. 1219–1235), written by Serbian monk Teodosije the Hilandarian (1246–1328), after the first biography written in 1254 by monk Domentijan.

== See also ==
- List of medieval Serbian literature
