= Kyr Kozma =

Serbian painter

Kyr Kozma (Master Kozma or Kozma) was one of the most renowned Serbian painters who lived and worked in the sixteenth and early seventeenth century along with the likes of Zograf Longin, Zograf Radul, Avesalom Vujičić, and Georgije Mitrofanović.

Kozma is remembered for his work in the Morača Monastery in Montenegro. In the monastery's Church of the Assumption (Crkva Uspenja Bogorodice), founded in 1252 by Stefan Vladislav, grandson of Stefan Nemanja, the wall paintings (mostly from the sixteenth- and seventeenth-century) are Georgije Mitrofanović's work while next to the narthex, in the adjacent chapel are the scenes depicting the life of Stefan painted by Kyr Kozma. Not too far away, there is the Church of St. Nicholas (crkva sv. Nikole), dating from 1635, which also features frescoes by Kyr Kozma.

== See also ==
- List of painters from Serbia
- Serbian art
- Zograf Longin
- Zograf Radul
- Andrija Raičević
- Avesalom Vujičić
- Georgije Mitrofanović
