= Tetraevangelion =

Tetraevangelion (Greek: τετραευαγγέλιον, "Four Evangelia/Gospel Books"; Georgian: ოთხთავი, ot'kht'avi; Old Slavonic: благовѣствованиѥ; Bulgarian: Четвероевангелие; Serbian: Четворојеванђеље) is a name used in Eastern Orthodox terminology for the Canonical gospels of the Four Evangelists. Examples of notable medieval manuscripts include:

- Gospels of Tsar Ivan Alexander (1355–56), Bulgarian, illuminated.
- Jakov of Serres' (1354), Serbian, illuminated.
- Vani Gospels (12–13th c.), Georgian, illuminated.
- Mstislav Gospel (12th c.), Russian, illuminated.
- Codex Marianus (11th c.), South Slavic. One of the oldest Slavic tetraevangelia.
- Codex Zographensis (10–11th c.), South Slavic, illuminated. Oldest Slavic tetraevangelion.

== Sources ==
- Francis Watson (26 May 2013). Gospel Writing: A Canonical Perspective. Wm. B. Eerdmans Publishing. pp. 584–. ISBN 978-0-8028-4054-7.
