= Vrdnik =

Vrdnik Врдник (Serbian)
- Village (Selo)
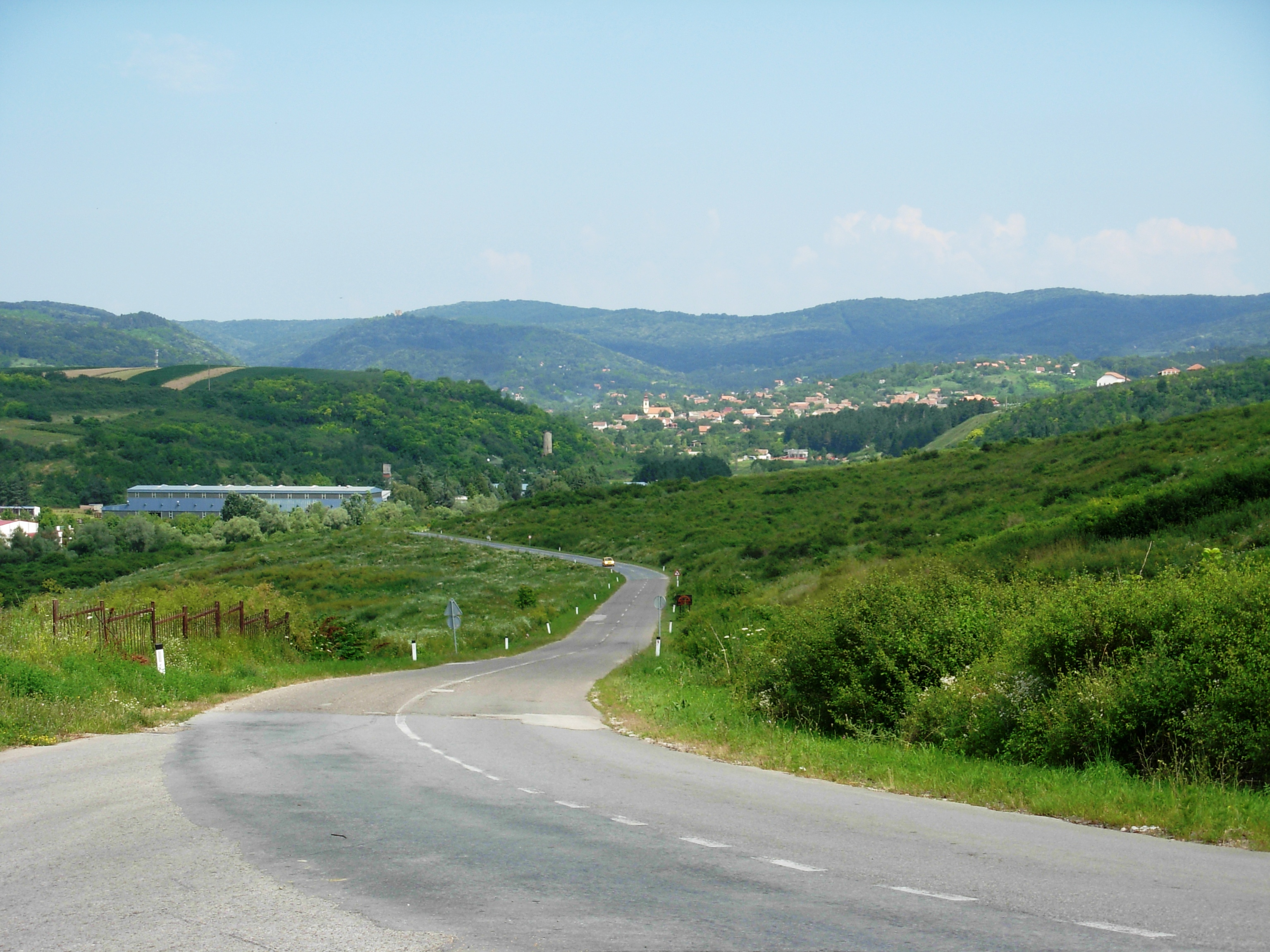
- View on Vrdnik from far
- Interactive map of Vrdnik
- Country: Serbia
- Province: Vojvodina
- District: Srem
- Municipality: Irig

Area
  - Total: 33.7 km^{2} (13.0 sq mi)
- Elevation: 267 m (876 ft)

Population (2011)
  - Total: 3,092
  - Density: 91.8/km^{2} (238/sq mi)
- Time zone: UTC+1 (CET)
  - Summer (DST): UTC+2 (CEST)

Vrdnik (Serbian Cyrillic: Врдник; pronounced [vř̩dniːk]) is a village located in the municipality of Irig, northern Serbia, in the Vojvodina province of Serbia. It is located at southern slopes of Fruška Gora, at the border of the national park. As of 2011 census, it has a population of 3,092 inhabitants.

Vrdnik is one of Serbia’s leading destinations for spa and wellness tourism.

== History ==
9th century BC graves of Bosut culture were found in Vrdnik.

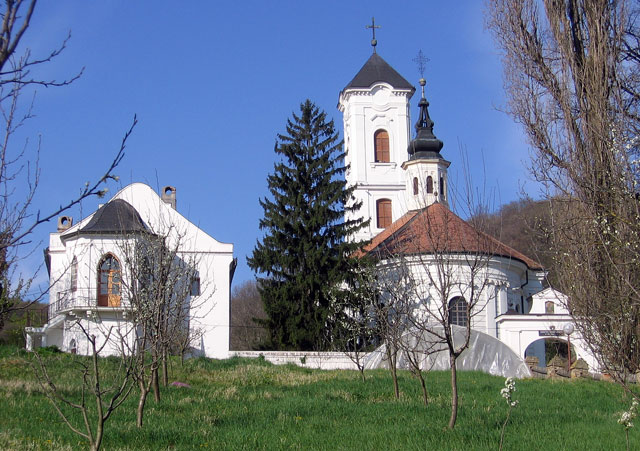
Ravanica monastery

Tower of Vrdnik is significant historical monument, whose basements date from the Roman period. The tower's builder supposedly was Roman emperor Probus in 287. During the reign of the Kingdom of Hungary, a new fortress was built in the 14th century on its remains, of which only the today's tower remained. The Castellum Redneck, as it was called, was probably used for protection of Vrdnik and partly Sirmium (Sremska Mitrovica).

This first written data about Vrdnik fortress date from 1315, but they consistently reappeared only after 1702 The village developed along the nearby monastery, and the population consisted of emigrants from all sides who worked as serfs at the monastery's property. They lived at the settlement called Prnjavor which was separate from the Village.

The key year for the development of Vrdnik was 1804, when a brown coal mine was opened following the discovery of large deposits. For almost a century and a half, it was the key feature of the village's development. Miners from entire Habsburg monarchy settled in the town, forming new parts of the settlement, first of which is now known as the Old Colony (Stara Kolonija). Lipovac developed next, along the road to village and monastery Jazak. The smallest part is New Colony, raised between 1890 and 1908 and lies at the western part of the town. The part named "Clerk's line" (Činovnički red) was apparently housed by clerks from the mine and administration.

The mine was closed in 1968 because deposits were largely exhausted, and coal exploitation became unviable. The village's population is in a decay since.

== Spa ==
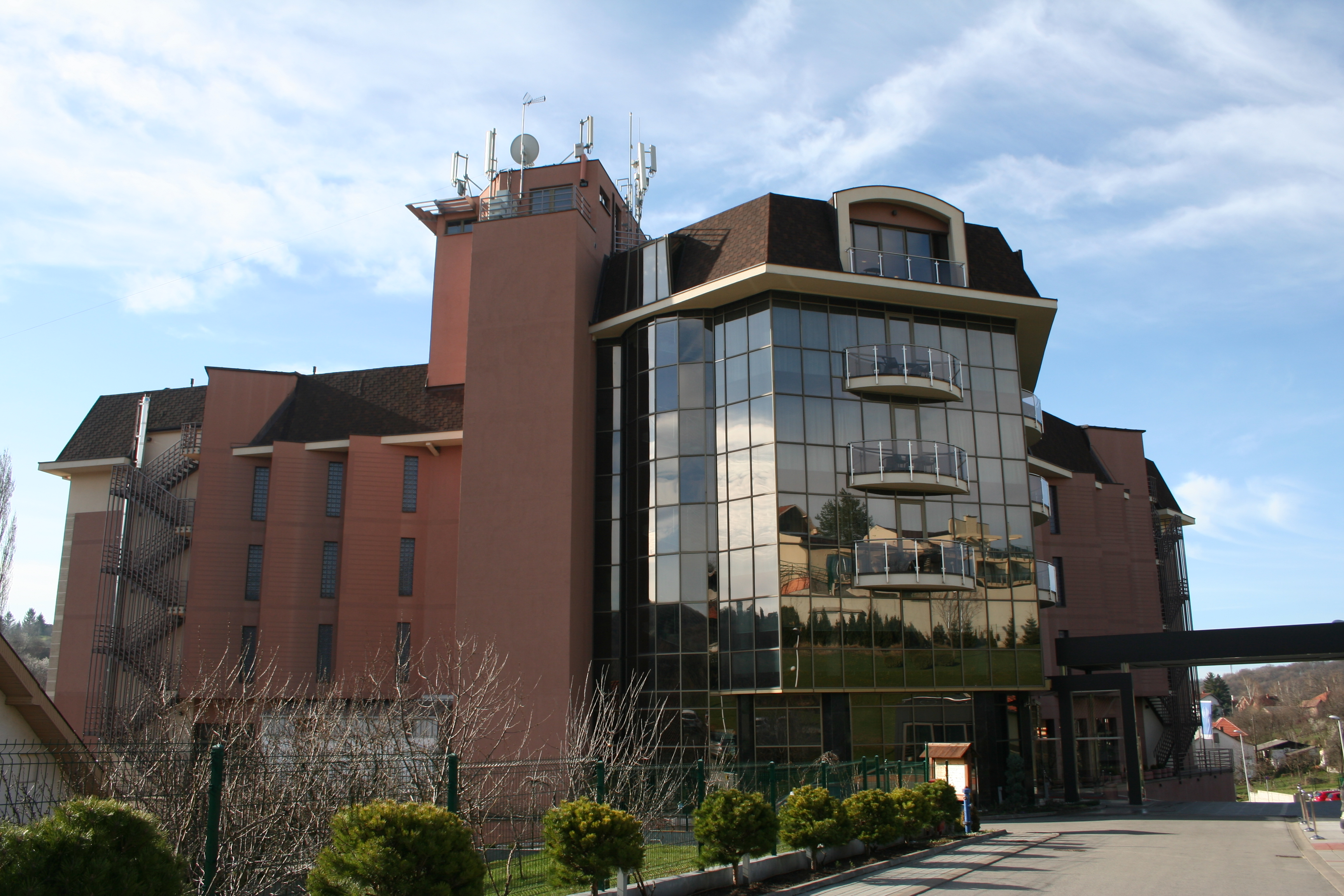
Hotel Premier Aqua

Vrdnik Spa has attracted significant investment in tourism infrastructure, including the development of hotels, wellness and spa facilities, and other visitor amenities. These investments have helped transform the resort into one of Serbia’s leading destinations for spa and wellness tourism.

The water temperature is 32.8 °C, and the spa is suitable for treatment of rheumatoid ailments, postoperative conditions, various painful disorders, and general balneologic recuperation.

== Demographics ==
Historical population
Year	Pop.	±% p.a.
1948	4,070	—
1953	4,153	+0.40%
1961	4,610	+1.31%
1971	4,072	−1.23%
1981	3,612	−1.19%
1991	3,495	−0.33%
2002	3,704	+0.53%
2011	3,092	−1.99%

As of 2011 census, the village of Vrdnik has a population of 3,092 inhabitants.

== Notable people ==
- Aleksandar Berček, actor
- Franjo Ožegović, Yugoslav geologist
- Milan Stepanović, poet
- Milica Stojadinović-Srpkinja, poet
- Zvonko Turkali, architect

== See also ==
- List of spa towns in Serbia
- List of places in Serbia
- List of cities, towns and villages in Vojvodina

== Literature ==
- Slobodan Ćurčić, Broj stanovnika Vojvodine, Novi Sad, 1996.
