= List of Serbs =

List of Serbs contains notable people who are Serbs or of Serb ancestry. The list includes all notable Serbs sorted by occupation and year of birth, regardless of any political, territorial or other divisions, historical or modern.

Traditional tricolor flag of the Serbs, in continuous use since 1835

== Artists ==
=== Visual artists ===
==== Architects ====
- Atanasije Nikolić (1803–1882)
- Emilijan Josimović (1823–1897)
- Nikola Djordjević (the 19th century)
- Aleksandar Bugarski (1835–1891)
- Svetozar Ivačković (1844–1924), post-Romantic architect
- Konstantin Jovanović (1849–1923), architect who designed National assemblies of Serbia and Bulgaria and National Bank of Serbia
- Milan Antonović (1850–1929)
- Milica Krstić Čolak-Antić (1887–1964), one of the most important female architects during the first half of the twenty-first century.
- Vladimir Nikolić (1857–1922)
- Andra Stevanović (1859–1929)
- Dimitrije T. Leko (1864–1914), Serbian architect and urbanist
- Nikola Nestorović (1868–1957)
- Danilo Vladisavljević (1871–1923)
- Momčilo Tapavica (1872–1949), designer of Novi Sad's Matica Srpska building; also 1st Serb to win an Olympic medal at 1st modern Olympic Games (Athens, Greece, 1896)
- Petar Popović (1873–1945)
- Petar Bajalović (1876–1947)
- Branko Tanazević (1876–1945)
- Jelisaveta Načić (1876–1955), pioneer in women's architecture in Serbia
- Đura Bajalović (1879–1949)
- Momir Korunović (1883–1969)
- Dragiša Brašovan (1887–1965), modernist architect, leading architect of the early 20th century in Yugoslavia
- Jovanka Bončić-Katerinić (1887–1966), architect, 1st woman engineer in Germany
- Milan Minić (architect) (1889–1961, architect
- Aleksandar Deroko (1894–1988), architect, artist, professor and author
- Nikola Dobrović (1897–1967)
- Milan Zloković (1898–1965), architect, founder of the Group of Architects of Modern Expressions.
- Branislav Kojić (1899–1986)
- Mihailo Janković (1911–1976), architect who designed several important structures in Serbia
- Milica Šterić (1914–1998), architect for Energoprojekt, built post World War 2 power plants
- Alexis Josic (1921–2011), French architect
- Bogdan Bogdanović (1922–2010), architect, urbanist and essayist, designed monumental concrete sculpture in Jasenovac
- Ivan Antić (1923–2005), architect and academic, considered one of the former Yugoslavia's best post-World War 2 architects
- Ilija Arnautović (1924–2009), Yugoslav and Serbian architect, known for his projects during the period of Serbian and Slovenian socialism (1960–1980)
- Ivanka Raspopović (1930–2015), Serbian architect
- Predrag Ristić (1931–2019), Serbian architect
- Ranko Radović (1935–2005)
- Aleksandar Đokić (1936–2002), architect known for Brutalist and postmodernist styles
- Zoran Bojović (1936–2018), architect for Energoprojekt, worked in Africa
- Zoran Manević (1937–2019), prominent Serbian architecture historian
- Ljiljana Bakić (1939–2022), Serbian architect
- Jovan Prokopljević (born 1940)
- Louis and Dennis Astorino (born 1948), American architects of Serbian origin, Louis was the 1st American architect to design a building in the Vatican
- Ksenija Bulatović (born 1967), architect
- Maja Vidaković Lalić (born 1972), architect
- Dubravka Sekulić (born 1980), architect and academic

==== Sculptors ====
- Petar Ubavkić (1852–1910), recognized as the first sculptor of modern Serbia
- Đorđe Jovanović (1861–1953), won prizes at the World Exhibitions in Paris 1889 and 1900 for the works "Gusle" and "Kosovo Monument"
- Simeon Roksandić (1874–1943), sculptor and academic, highly regarded for his bronzes and fountains (Čukur Fountain), frequently cited as one of the most important figures in Yugoslavian sculpture.
- Dragomir Arambašić (1881–1945)
- Vukosava Velimirović (1888–1965)
- Iva Despić-Simonović (1891–1961)
- Risto Stijović (1894–1974), sculptor, author of Monument to Franchet d'Esperey in Belgrade
- Sreten Stojanović (1898–1960)
- John David Brcin (1899–1983), Serbian American sculptor
- Yevgeny Vuchetich (1908–1974)
- Vojin Bakić (1915–1992), Yugoslav sculptor
- Bogosav Živković (1920–2005)
- Jovan Soldatović (1920–2005)
- Dragiša Stanisavljević (1921–2012)
- Olga Jevrić (1922–2014), awarded sculptor
- Matija Vuković (1925–1985)
- Dušan Džamonja (1928–2009), sculptor
- Miodrag Živković (1928–2020)
- Slavomir Miletić (born 1930)
- Nebojša Mitrić (1931–1989)
- Mirjana Isaković (born 1936), former professor at Faculty of Applied Arts
- Drinka Radovanović (born 1943), sculptor of many monuments to national heroes
- Slobodan Pejić (1944–2006)
- Lilly Otasevic (born 1969), Serbian born Canadian sculptor/designer
- Mihailo Stošović (born 1971)

==== Painters, cartoonists, illustrators ====
- Lovro Dobričević of Kotor (c. 1420 – 1478), Venetian painter who first started to paint at the Serbian Orthodox Savina Monastery, Montenegro, in the mid-15th century.
- Đorđe Mitrofanović (c. 1550 – 1630), Serbian fresco painter and muralist who travelled and worked throughout the Balkans and the Levant.
- Joakim Marković (c. 1685 – 1757)
- Hristofor Žefarović (1710–1753)
- Teodor Stefanov Gologlavac (18th century)
- Janko Halkozović (18th century)
- Jovan Četirević Grabovan (1720–1781)
- Jakov Orfelin, (early 18th century–1803)
- Vasa Ostojić, (1730–1791)
- Teodor Kračun (1730–1781)
- Dimitrije Bačević (1735–1770)
- Nikola Nešković (1740–1789)
- Lazar Serdanović, (1744–1799)
- Simeon Lazović (c. 1745 – 1817)
- Teodor Ilić Češljar (1746–1793)
- Stefan Gavrilović (c. 1750 – 1823)
- Jovan Pačić (1771–1849)
- Pavel Đurković (1772–1830)
- Aleksije Lazović (1774–1873)
- Petar Nikolajević Moler (1775–1816), revolutionary and painter
- Georgije Bakalović (1786–1843), Serbian painter
- Konstantin Danil (1798–1873), painter and portraitist of the 19th century
- Grigorije Davidović-Obšić, (18th century)
- Uroš Knežević (1811–1876)
- Katarina Ivanović (1811–1882)
- Dimitrije Avramović (1815–1855), painter known best for his iconostasis and frescos.
- Pavel Petrović (1818–1887)
- Pavel Đurković (early 19th century)
- Novak Radonić (1826–1890)
- Mina Karadžić (1828–1894)
- Đura Jakšić (1832–1878)
- Ladislav Eugen Petrovits (1839–1907)
- Đorđe Krstić (1851–1907)
- Uroš Predić (1857–1923)
- Paja Jovanović (1859–1957)
- Anastas Bocarić (1864–1944)
- Marko Murat (1864–1944)
- Dragutin Inkiostri Medenjak (1866–1942), painter and is also considered the first interior designer in Serbia.
- Jovan Pešić (1866–1936)
- Beta Vukanović (1872–1972)
- Rista Vukanović (1873–1918)
- Nadežda Petrović (1873–1915)
- Stevan Aleksić (1876–1923)
- Veljko Stanojević (1878–1977)
- Branko Popović (1882–1944)
- Todor Švrakić (1882–1931)
- Ljubomir Ivanović (1882–1945)
- Lazar Drljača (1882–1970)
- Jovan Bijelić (1886–1964)
- Petar Dobrović (1890–1942)
- Vasa Pomorišac (1893–1961)
- Risto Stijović (1894–1974)
- Zora Petrović (1894–1962)
- Ilija Bašičević (1895–1972)
- Ignjat Job (1895–1936)
- Sava Šumanović (1896–1942)
- Mladen Josić (1897–1972)
- Milo Milunović (1897–1967)
- Milan Konjović (1898–1993)
- Ivan Tabaković (1898–1977)
- Živko Stojsavljević (1900–1978)
- Dragan Aleksić (1901–1958), Yugoslav dadaist painter, founder of Yugo-Dada
- Mihajlo Petrov (1902–1983)
- Marko Čelebonović (1902–1986), artist
- Đorđe Andrejević Kun (1904–1964) Serbian and Yugoslavian painter, designer of the Belgrade Coat of Arms and reputedly designed the Coat of arms of Yugoslavia and Yugoslav orders and medals
- Janko Brašić (1906–1994), one of the foremost contributors to the naive art genre
- Petar Lubarda (1907–1974)
- Predrag Milosavljević (1908–1989)
- Milena Pavlović-Barili (1909–1945)
- Ljubica Sokić (1914–2009)
- Miodrag B. Protić (1922–2014)
- Ljubinka Jovanović (1922–2015)
- Milorad Bata Mihailović (1923–2011)
- Mića Popović (1923–1996)
- Mića Popović (1923–1996)
- Kossa Bokchan (1925–2009)
- Sava Stojkov (1925–2014)
- Mladen Srbinović (1925–2009)
- Petar Omčikus (1926–2019)
- Ljubomir Pavićević Fis (1927–2015), graphic- and industrial designer, According to the Belgrade Museum of Applied Arts, "Serbia's oldest and most well-known designer".
- Draginja Vlasic (1928–2011), painter
- Radomir Stević Ras (1931–1982)
- Olja Ivanjicki (1931–2009), contemporary artist in fields such as sculpture, poetry, costume design, architecture and writing, but was best known for her painting.
- Predrag Koraksić Corax (born 1933), political caricaturist
- Ljuba Popović (1934–2016)
- Milić od Mačve (1934–2000)
- Vladislav Lalicki (1935–2008)
- Milovan Destil Marković (born 1957)
- Vladimir Veličković (1935–2019)
- Radomir Damnjanović Damnjan (born 1935)
- Bratsa Bonifacho (born 1937)
- Djordje Prudnikov (1939–2017)
- Dušan Otašević (born 1940)
- Stevan Knežević (1940–1995)
- Dušan Petričić (born 1946), illustrator and caricaturist (Toronto Star, New York Times)
- Dragan Malešević Tapi (1949–2002)
- Jugoslav Vlahović (born 1949), illustrator, known for many Yugoslav album covers
- Relja Penezic (born 1950)
- Branislav Kerac (born 1952), comics artist, he created Cat Claw
- Rastko Ćirić (born 1955)
- Gradimir Smudja (born 1956), cartoonist in France and Italy, published acclaimed "Le Cabaret des Muses"
- Mile V. Pajić (born 1958)
- Milica Tomić (born 1960)
- Zoran Janjetov (born 1961), comics artist, worked with Alejandro Jodorowsky
- Slobodan Peladić (1962–2019)
- Aleksandar Zograf (born 1963), cartoonist
- Uroš Đurić (born 1964)
- Gradimir Smudja (born 1965)
- Petar Meseldžija (born 1965)
- Jasmina Đokić (born 1970)
- Viktor Mitic (born 1970)
- Irena Kazazić (born 1972), Slovenian painter of Serbian origin
- Aleksa Gajić (born 1974), comics artist

==== Performance artists ====
- Marina Abramović (born 1946), performance artist
- Ana Prvacki (born 1976), performance and installation artist

==== Photographers ====
- Anastas Jovanović (1817–1899), first professional photographer of Serbia
- Branibor Debeljković) (1916–2003), the first photographer member of ULUS (Serbian Association of Artists)
- Stevan Kragujević (1922–2002), photojournalist and art photographer
- Boris Spremo (1935–2017), Serbian-born Canadian award-winning photojournalist, member of the Order of Canada
- Dragan Tanasijević (born 1959), portrait photographer
- Željko Jovanović (born 1961), press photographer
- Srdjan Ilic (born 1966), award-winning press photographer
- Boogie (Vladimir Milivojevich) (born 1969), Serbian-born American documentary photographer
- Goran Tomasevic (born 1969), award-winning press photographer for Reuters
- Milena Rakocević, fashion photographer
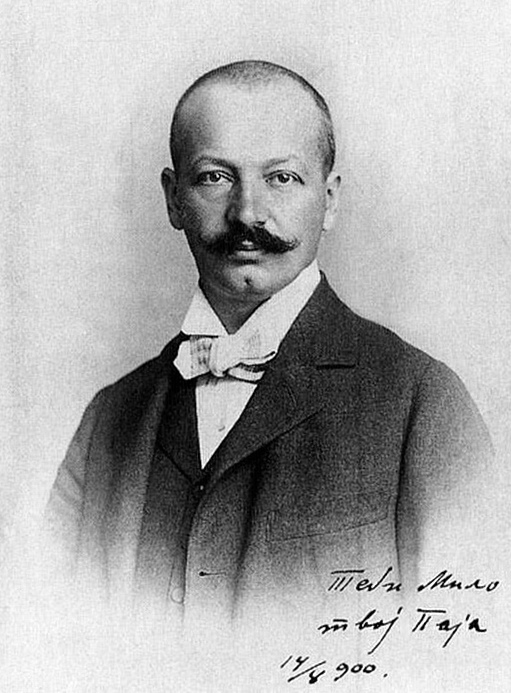
Paja Jovanović remains one of Serbia's most acclaimed painters.

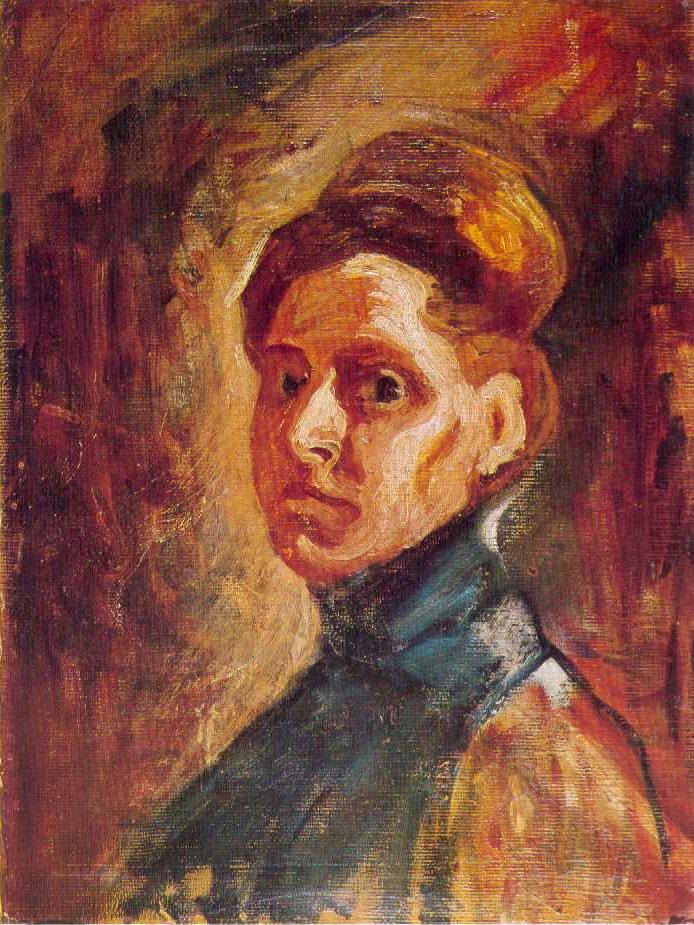
Nadežda Petrović was a noted painter and photography pioneer.

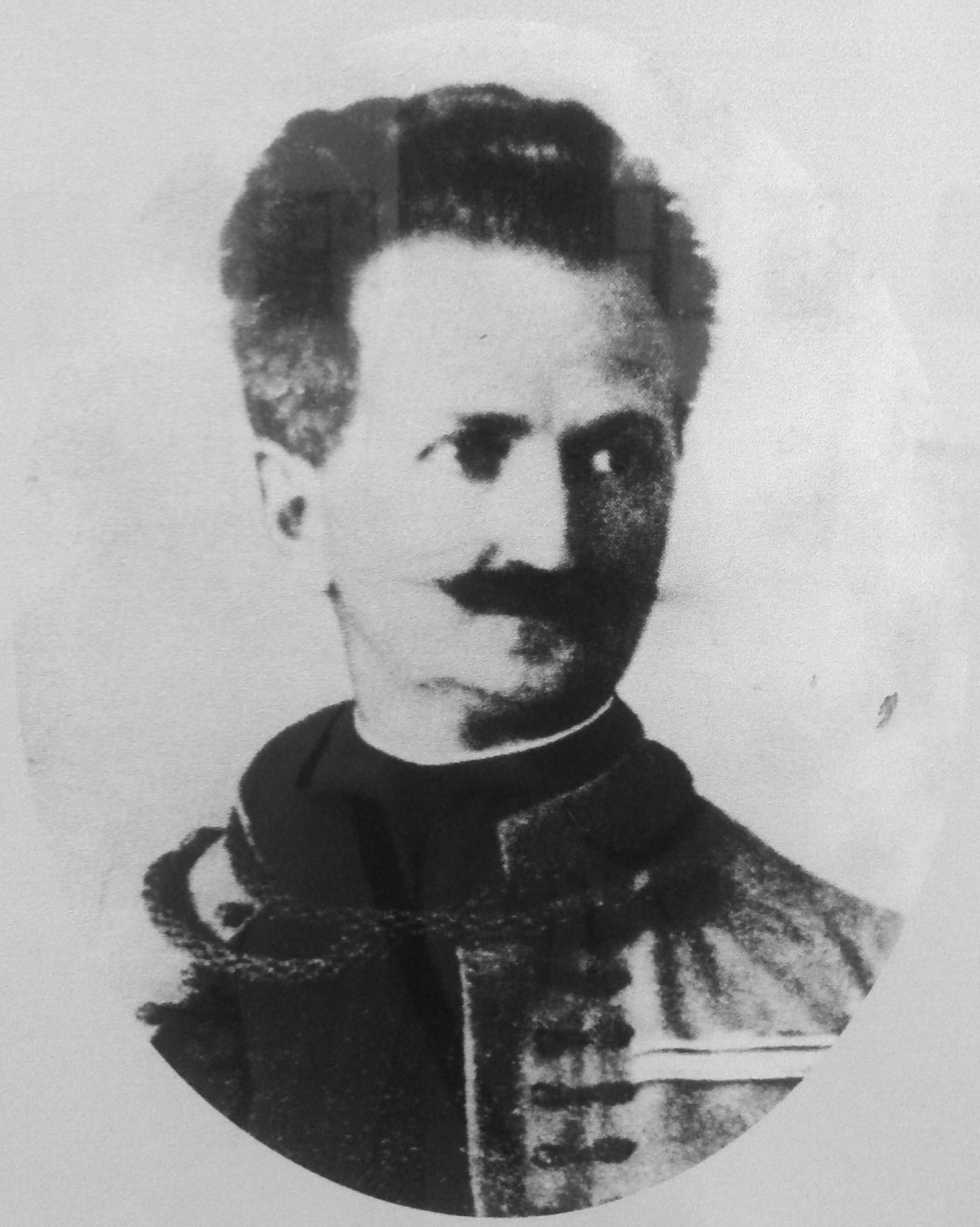
Momir Korunović was the leading architect of unique Serbo-Byzantine Revival architectural school.

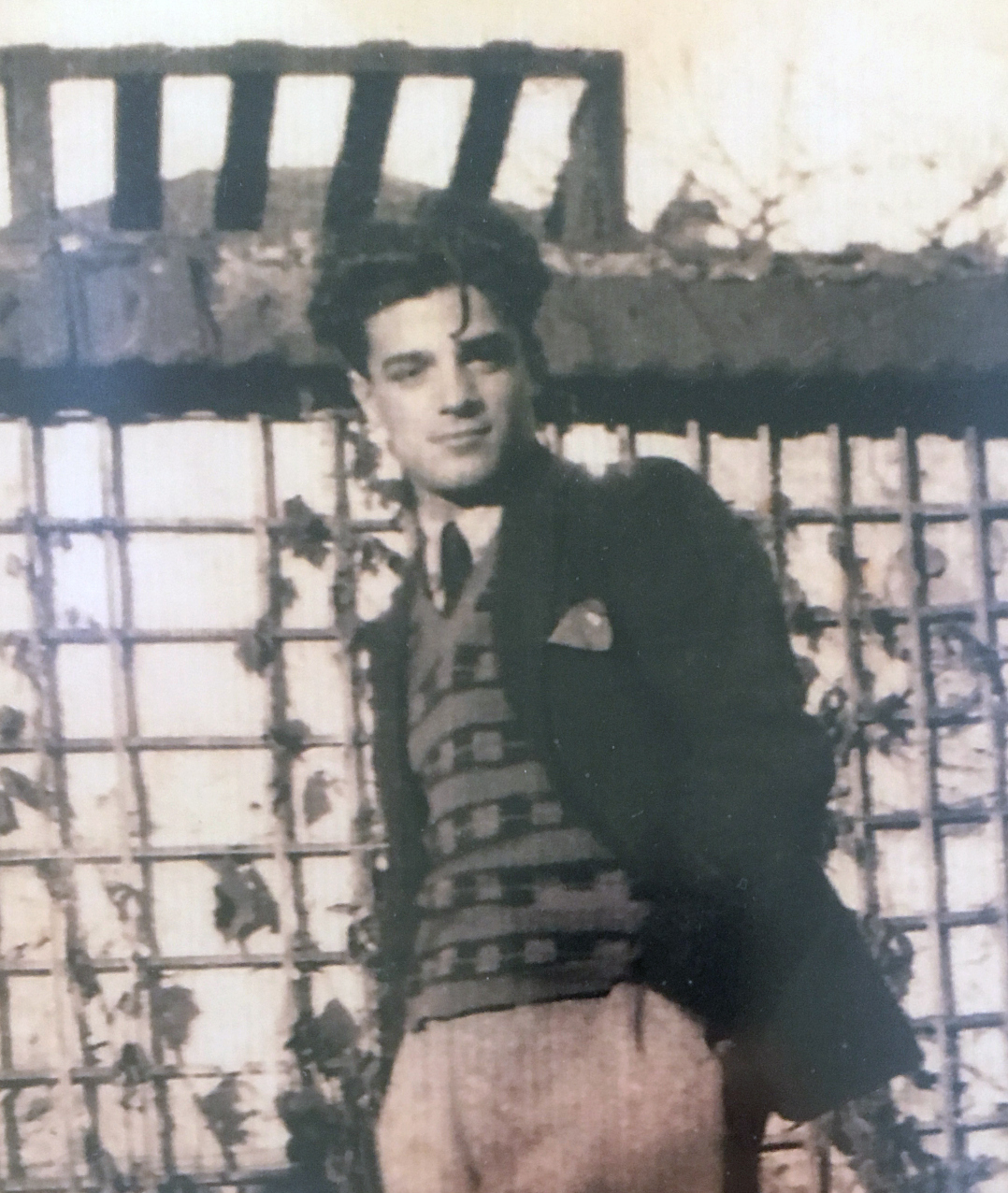
Petar Lubarda was an internationally acclaimed painter.

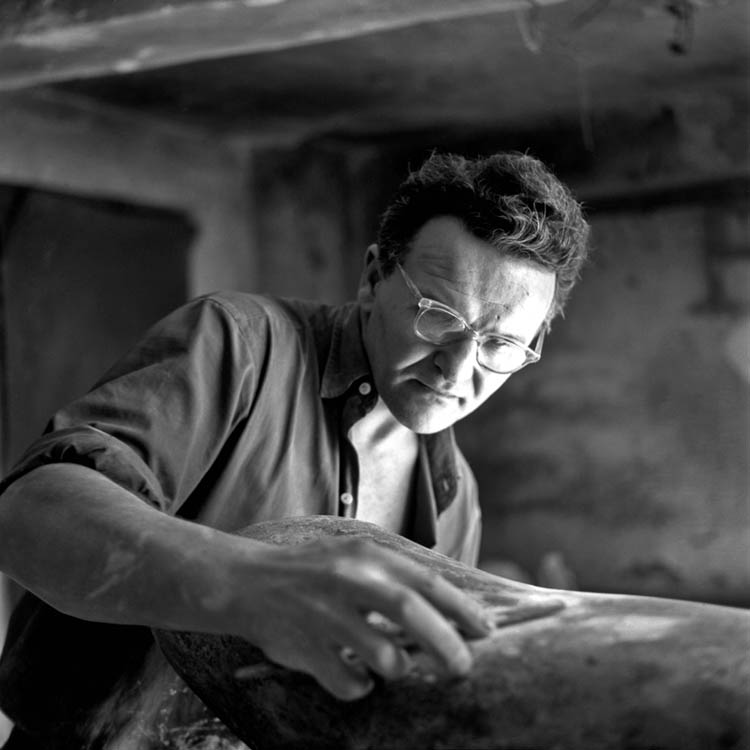
Vojin Bakić was a prominent sculptor in Yugoslavia.

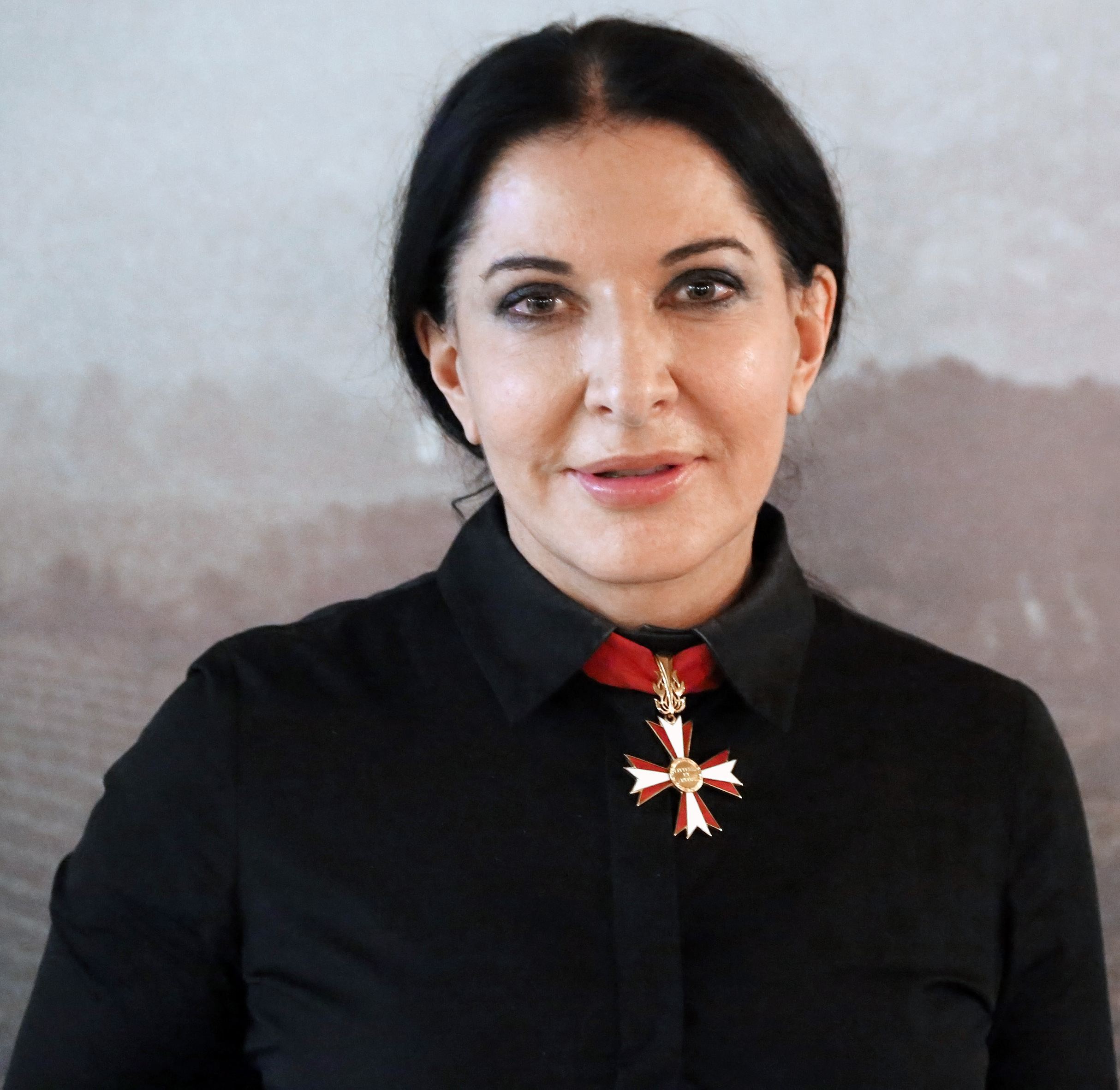
Marina Abramović is dubbed the "Godmother of performance art".

=== Musicians ===
==== Composers ====
- Kir Joakim (14th and early 15th century)
- Kir Stefan the Serb (14th and early 15th century)
- Nikola the Serb (14th and early 15th century)
- Isaiah the Serb (14th and early 15th century)
- Pajsije (1542–1647), the Serbian Patriarch from 1614 to 1647, he also composed chants
- Josip Runjanin, (1821–1878), Croatian and Serbian composer, ethnic Serb.
- Kornelije Stanković (1831–1865)
- Jovan Ivanović (1845–1902), Romanian composer and military conductor
- Slavka Atanasijević (1850–1897), Serbian composer and pianist.
- Josif Marinković (1851–1923), one of the most important Serbian composers of the 19th century.
- Stevan Stojanović Mokranjac (1856–1914)
- Jovo Ivanišević (1861–1889)
- Stanislav Binički (1872–1942)
- Marko Nešić (1873–1938)
- Petar Krstić (1877–1957)
- Petar Stojanović (1877–1957)
- Isidor Bajić (1878–1918)
- Petar Konjović (1883–1970)
- Miloje Milojević (1884–1946)
- Stevan Hristić (1885–1958)
- Rudolph Reti (1885–1957)
- Mihailo Vukdragović (1900–1967)
- Marko Tajčević (1900–1984)
- Ljubica Marić (1909–2003)
- Dragutin Gostuški (1923–1998)
- Vasilije Mokranjac (1923–1984)
- Dusan Trbojevic (1925–2011)
- Aleksandar Obradović (1927–2001)
- Dejan Despić (born 1930)
- Voki Kostić (1931–2010)
- Zoran Sztevanovity (born 1942)
- Milan Mihajlović (born 1945)
- Zoran Simjanović (1946–2021)
- Dušan Šestić (born 1946), composer of the National anthem of Bosnia and Herzegovina
- Vojna Nešić (born 1947)
- Vladimir Tošić (born 1949)
- Zoran Erić (born 1950)
- Goran Bregović (born 1950), Yugoslav and Bosnian composer
- Dušan Bogdanović (born 1955)
- Miloš Raičković (born 1956)
- Vladimir Graić (born 1967)
- Isidora Žebeljan (1967–2020)
- Ana Sokolovic (born 1968), Serbian born Canadian music composer
- Aleksandra Vrebalov (born 1970), Serbian – American composer
- Aleksandar Kobac (born 1971)
- Kornelije Kovač (born 1942)
- Aleksandra Kovač (born 1972)
- Kristina Kovač (born 1974)
- Jasna Veličković (born 1974)
- Đuro Živković (born 1975)

==== Opera singers ====
- Miroslav Čangalović (1921–1999)
- Radmila Bakočević (born 1933), spinto soprano
- Olivera Miljaković (born 1934)
- Milka Stojanović (1937–2023), soprano, prima donna at the Belgrade National Opera for decades, appearing internationally in East and West
- Radmila Smiljanić (born 1940), classical soprano who has had an active international career in operas and concerts since 1965. She is particularly known for her portrayals of heroines from the operas of Giuseppe Verdi and Giacomo Puccini.
- Oliver Njego (born 1959), baritone, student of Bakočević, who also crossed over into popular music, eventually becoming a prominent opera singer.
- Dragana Jugović del Monaco (born 1963)
- Laura Pavlović, lyric and spinto soprano opera singer, and a soloist with the Serbian National Theatre Opera in Novi Sad.
- Milena Kitic (born 1968), Serbian-born American mezzo-soprano
- Željko Lučić (born 1968), Serbian operatic baritone
- Suzana Šuvaković Savić (1969–2016)
- Jelena Bodražić (born 1971)
- Nikola Mijailović (born 1973), baritone
- David Bižić (born 1975), baritone
- Milo Miloradovich (1887–1972), soprano opera singer, cookbook author, and investment fund councillor

==== Music performers ====
- Filip Višnjić (1767–1834), guslar
- Đuro Milutinović the Blind (1774–1844), guslar
- Petar Perunović-Perun (1880–1952), Montenegrin Serb, naturalized U.S., guslar
- Vlastimir Pavlović Carevac (1895–1965), Serbian violinist, conductor and founder and director of the National Orchestra of Radio Belgrade
- Jovan Šajnović (1924–2004)
- Mihailo Živanović (1928–1989), clarinetist, saxophonist and composer
- Milenko Stefanović (1930–2022), classical and jazz clarinettist
- Duško Gojković (born 1931), jazz trumpetist and composer
- Boki Milošević (1931–2018)
- Del Casher (born 1938), American musician and inventor
- Muruga Booker (born Steven Bookvich, 1942), drummer, composer, recording artist
- Brian Linehan (1944–2004), host-producer of TV's City Lights
- Bora Dugić (born 1945), flautist
- Alex Lifeson (born Aleksandar Živojinović, 1953), Guitarist for the legendary rock band Rush
- Lene Lovich (born 1949), New Wave singer-songwriter, musician
- Raša Đelmaš (born 1950), rock drummer
- Philippe Đokić (born 1950), professor of violin at Dalhousie University
- Radomir Mihailović Točak (born 1950), rock, jazz, blues guitarist
- Laza Ristovski (1956–2007), rock/jazz keyboard player
- Miroslav Tadić (born 1956), classical guitarist
- Milan Mladenović (1958–1994), singer, guitar player
- Uroš Dojčinović (born 1959), guitarist
- Dragomir Mihajlović (born 1960), guitarist
- Zoran Lesandrić (born 1961), rock musician
- Boban Marković (born 1964), acclaimed brass ensemble leader (Boban Marković Orchestra), won "Best Orchestra" at 40th Guča Sabor (2000)
- Bojan Zulfikarpašić (born 1968), pianist
- Mike Dimkich (born 1968), Punk guitarist (The Cult & Bad Religion)
- Marija Bubanj (born 1968), violinist, violist, and music instructor
- Marina Arsenijevic (born 1970), concert pianist and composer
- Marija Gluvakov (born 1973)
- Ana Popović (born 1976), blues guitarist
- Stefan Milenković (born 1977), violin player
- Slobodan Trkulja (born 1977), multi-instrumentalist
- Kornelije Kovač (born 1978), rock keyboard player and composer
- Miloš Mihajlović (born 1978)
- Milaan (born 1979), accordionist
- Jasna Popovic (born 1979), pianist
- Denise Djokic (born 1980), Canadian cellist
- Maja Bogdanović (born 1982), cellist
- Ivy Jenkins (born Ivana Vujic, 1983), metal bass player, fashion designer
- Nemanja Radulović (born 1985), violinist
- Jelena Mihailović (born 1987), cellist
- Marija Šestić (born 1987)
- Dejan Bogdanović
- Tatjana Olujić
- Đorđe Stijepović (born 1977), double bass player and composer

==== Singers ====
- Nada Mamula (1927–2001), traditional folk singer
- Đorđe Marjanović (1931–2021)
- Bora Spužić Kvaka (1934–2002), singer
- Lola Novaković (1935–2016), pop singer
- Predrag Živković Tozovac (1936–2021)
- Arsen Dedić (1938–2015), chanson singer
- Toma Zdravković (1938–1991)
- Lepa Lukić (born 1940), folk singer
- Boba Stefanović (1946–2015)
- Dušan Prelević (1948–2007, singer, journalist, and writer
- Miroslav Ilić (born 1950), folk singer
- Miloš Bojanić (born 1950), folk singer
- Šaban Šaulić (1951–2019), folk singer-songwriter
- Zdravko Čolić (born 1951), pop singer
- Bora Đorđević (born 1953), rock musician, member of Riblja Čorba
- Đorđe Balašević (born 1953), pop-rock musician
- Slađana Milošević (born 1955), rock musician
- Željko Samardžić (born 1955), pop singer
- Zorica Brunclik (born 1955), folk singer
- Roki Vulović (born 1955), singer
- Vesna Zmijanac (born 1957), pop-folk singer
- Mitar Mirić (born 1957), folk singer
- Goran Šepa (born 1958), musician best known as the frontman of Kerber
- Lepi Mića (born 1959), singer
- Ana Bekuta (born 1959)
- Snežana Đurišić (born 1959)
- Momčilo Bajagić "Bajaga" (born 1960), rock musician, member of Bajaga i Instruktori
- Bebi Dol (born 1962), pop, rock and jazz singer-songwriter
- Nele Karajlić (born 1962), rock musician, member of Zabranjeno Pušenje
- Baja Mali Knindža (born 1966), singer
- Aca Lukas (born 1968), pop-folk musician
- Dragana Mirković (born 1968), pop-folk singer
- Divna Ljubojević (born 1970), singer
- Svetlana Spajić (born 1971), world music singer-songwriter
- Aleksandra Kovač (born 1972), pop and R&B singer-songwriter, member of K2
- Željko Joksimović (born 1972), pop singer, 2nd place at Eurovision 2004, and 3rd place at Eurovision 2012
- Aco Pejović (born 1972)
- Ceca (born 1973), pop-folk singer
- Dalibor Andonov Gru (1973–2019), rapper
- Aleksandra Radović (born 1974), pop and R&B singer
- Viki Miljković (born 1974)
- Goca Tržan (born 1974), Europop singer, member of Tap 011
- Kristina Kovač (born 1974), pop and R&B singer-songwriter, member of K2
- Vlado Georgiev (born 1976), pop-rock musician
- Jelena Karleuša (born 1978), pop singer
- Konstrakta (born 1978), alternative-pop singer and songwriter
- Nataša Bekvalac (born 1980), pop singer
- Saša Matić (born 1978), pop-folk musician
- Seka Aleksić (born 1981), pop-folk singer
- Marija Šerifović (born 1984), pop singer, winner of the Eurovision 2007
- Bojana Vunturišević (born 1985), singer-songwriter
- Milan Stanković (born 1987), pop singer
- Stefan Đurić Rasta (born 1989), rapper
- Teya Dora (born 1992), pop singer
- Danica Crnogorčević (born 1993), religious songs singer
- Barbara Pravi (born 1993), French singer
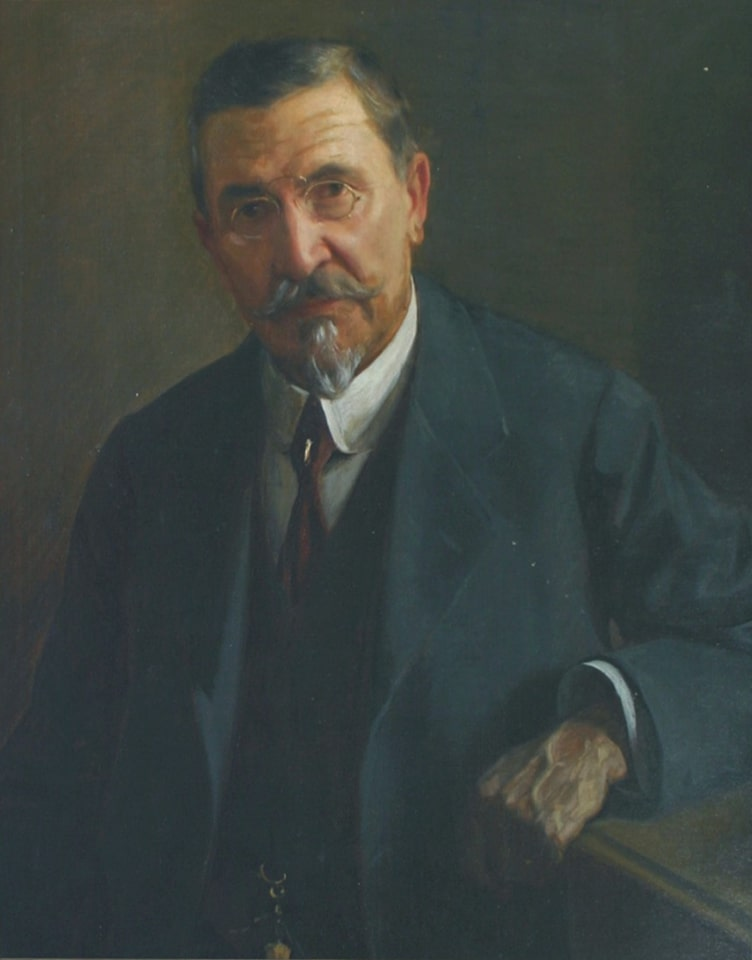
Composer and educator Stevan Mokranjac is considered the "father of Serbian music."

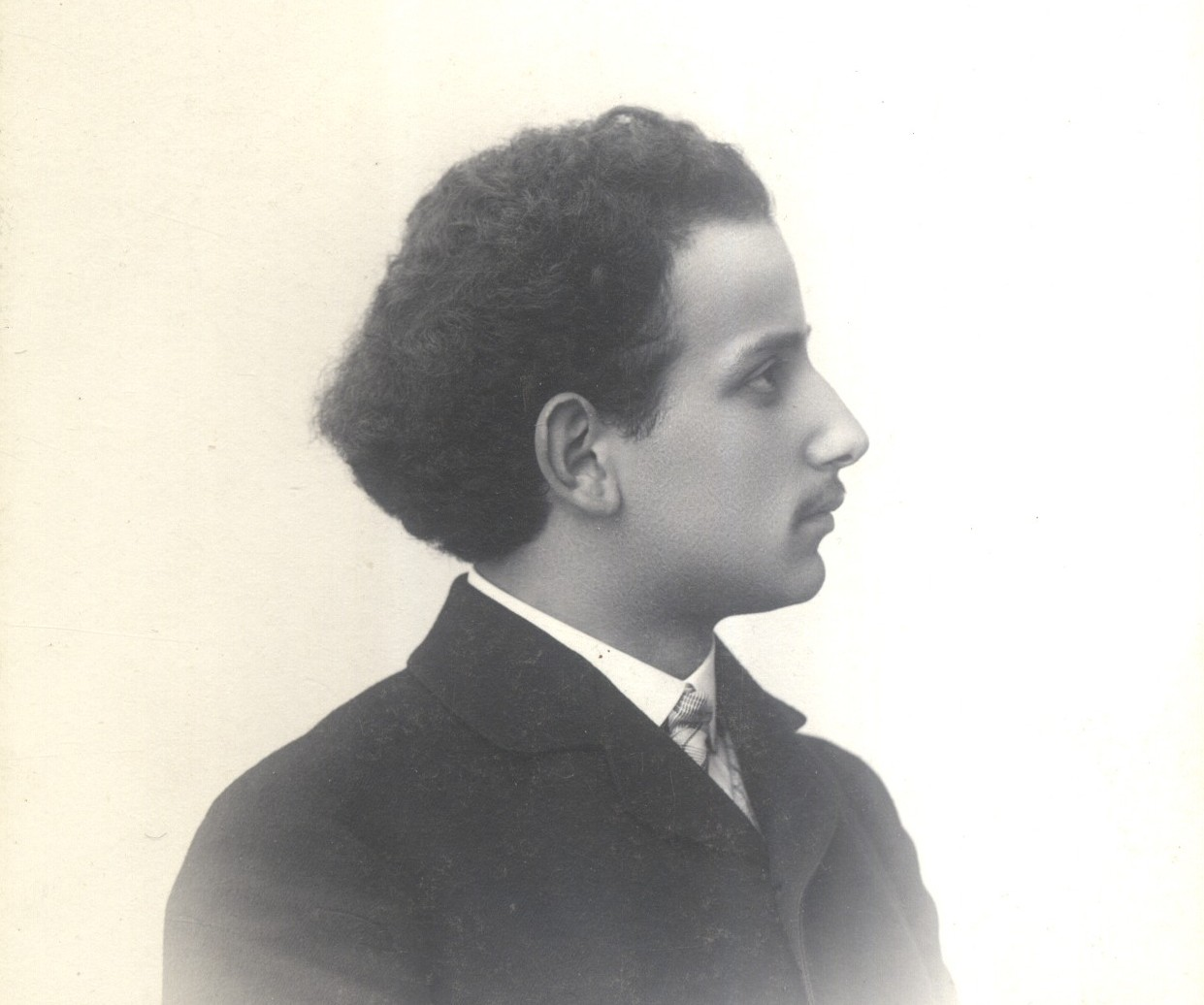
Stevan Hristić was a noted Serbian and Yugoslav composer.

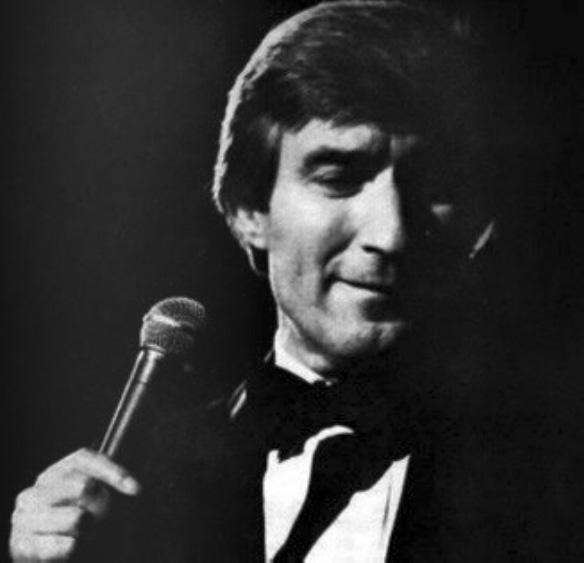
Toma Zdravković remains an iconic folk singer and bohemian figure.

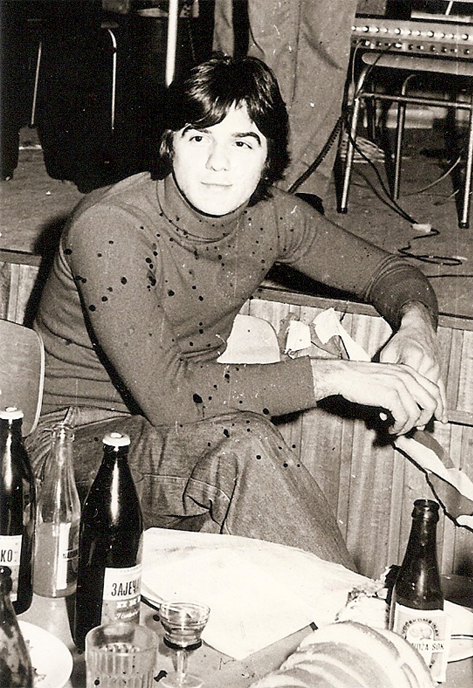
Zdravko Čolić is widely considered as one of the greatest vocalists and cultural icons of former Yugoslavia

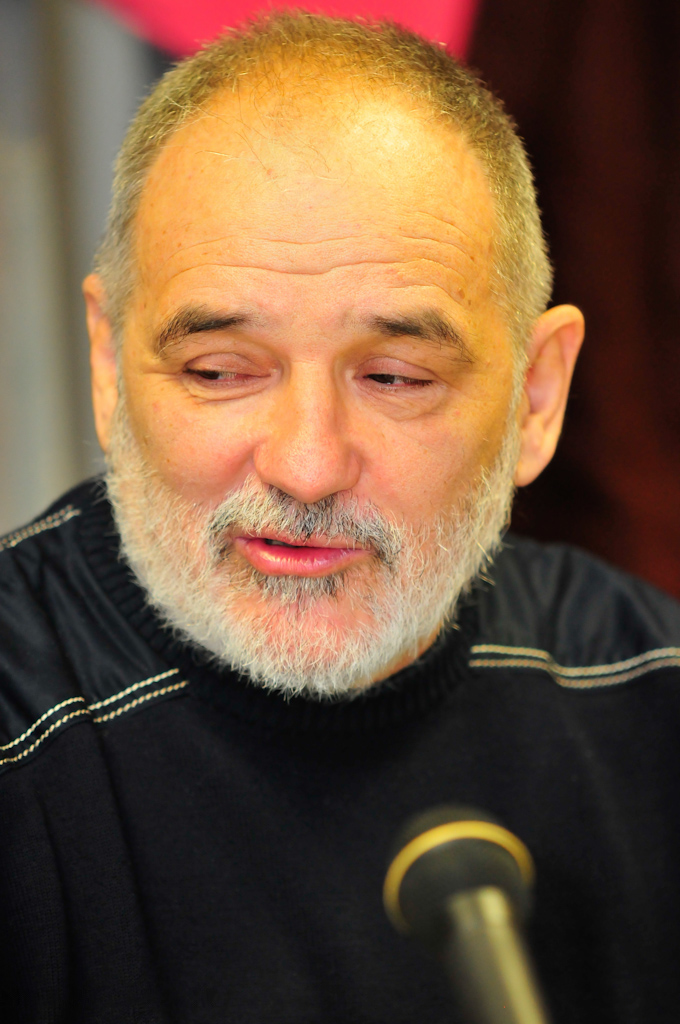
Đorđe Balašević was a notable Serbian singer-songwriter.

=== Performing artists ===
==== Actors ====
- Toša Jovanović (1845–1893)
- Milorad Petrović (1865–1928)
- Dobrica Milutinović (1880–1956)
- Žanka Stokić (1887–1947)
- Iván Petrovich (1894–1962) German actor of Serbian origin, silent screen star
- Ljubinka Bobić (1897–1978)
- Milivoje Živanović (1900–1976)
- Nevenka Urbanova (1909–2007), actress
- Gloria Grey (1909–1947), American silent film star
- John Miljan (1897–1960)
- Rahela Ferari (1911–1994)
- Karl Malden (1912–2009), Academy award-winning actor
- John Vivyan (1915–1983), born as John R. Vukayan; film, stage and television actor ("Mr. Lucky", a popular CBS adventure series), also a highly decorated veteran
- Brad Dexter (1917–2002), actor in Hollywood classics
- Rade Marković (1921–2010)
- Michel Auclair (1922–1988)
- Olga Spiridonović (1923–1994)
- Mija Aleksić (1923–1995)
- Mira Stupica (1923–2016)
- Mihajlo Bata Paskaljević (1923–2004)
- Miodrag Petrović Čkalja (1924–2003)
- Olivera Marković (1925–2011), actress
- Radmila Savićević (1926–2001)
- Branko Pleša (1926–2001)
- Pavle Vujisić (1926–1988)
- Stevo Žigon (1926–2005)
- Pavle Vujisić (1926–1988)
- Vlasta Velisavljević (1926–2021)
- Živojin Milenković (1928–2008)
- Ljuba Tadić (1929–2005)
- Vlastimir Đuza Stojiljković (1929–2015)
- Mira Banjac (born 1929)
- Renata Ulmanski (born 1929)
- Stevan Šalajić (1929–2002)
- Bora Todorović (1929–2014)
- Predrag Laković (1929–1997)
- Stole Aranđelović (1930–1993)
- Nadja Regin (1931–2019), Serbian actress, part of the crew of From Russia with Love
- Đoko Rosić (1932–2014)
- Dragomir Gidra Bojanić (1933–1993)
- Velimir Bata Živojinović (1933–2016)
- Jelena Žigon (1933–2018)
- Predrag Milinković (1933–1998)
- Dragomir Bojanić (1933–1993)
- Danilo Stojković (1934–2002)
- Taško Načić, (1934–1993)
- Ružica Sokić (1934–2013)
- Slobodan Aligrudić (1934–1985)
- Nikola Simić (1934–2014)
- Milena Vukotic (born 1935), Italian film actress
- Zoran Rankić (1935–2019)
- Ljubiša Samardžić (1936–2017)
- Ljubomir Ćipranić (1936–2010)
- Rada Rassimov (born 1938), Italian actress, best known for her role in The Good, the Bad and the Ugly
- Ivan Rassimov (1938–2003)
- Vera Čukić (born 1938)
- Mihailo Janketić (1938–2019)
- Zoran Bečić (1939–2006)
- Miloš Žutić (1939–1993)
- Gojko Mitić (born 1940)
- Olivera Katarina (born 1940)
- Milena Dravić (1940–2018)
- Neda Spasojević (1941–1981)
- Petar Kralj (1941–2011)
- Vladan Živković (born 1941)
- Mel Novak (born 1942)
- Seka Sablić (born 1942)
- Beba Lončar (born 1943), Serbian-Italian film actress
- Dragan Nikolić (1943–2016)
- Snežana Nikšić (born 1943)
- Dušica Žegarac (1944–2019)
- Boro Stjepanović (born 1946)
- Predrag Ejdus (1947–2018), actor of theater, film and television.
- Predrag Ejdus (1947–2018)
- Josif Tatić (1946–2013)
- Marko Nikolić (1946–2019)
- Milan Gutović (born 1946)
- Rade Šerbedžija (born 1946)
- Sasha Montenegro (born 1946)
- Petar Božović (born 1946)
- Branko Cvejić (born 1946)
- Miroljub Lešo (1946–2019)
- Branko Milićević (born 1946)
- Svetlana Bojković (born 1947)
- Stole Aranđelović (1949–2001)
- Vojislav Brajović (born 1949)
- Miodrag Krivokapić (born 1949)
- Dragan Maksimović (1949–2001)
- Miki Manojlović (born 1950), Yugoslav and Serbian actor, star of some of the most important films in Yugoslav cinema, president of the Serbian Film Center since 2009
- Natalia Nogulich (born 1950), American actress (Performed in Star Trek: The Next Generation)
- Aleksandar Berček (born 1950)
- Danilo Lazović (1951–2006)
- Lazar Ristovski (born 1952), actor and director
- Gorica Popović (born 1952)
- Predrag Miletić (born 1952)
- Tanja Bošković (born 1953)
- Bogdan Diklić (born 1953)
- Radmila Živković (born 1953)
- Radoš Bajić (born 1953)
- Neda Arnerić (1953–2020)
- Vesna Čipčić (born 1954)
- Jelica Sretenović (born 1954)
- Zlata Petković (1954–2012)
- Ljiljana Blagojević (born 1955)
- Mima Karadžić (born 1955)
- Milenko Zablaćanski (1955–2008)
- Branislav Lečić (born 1955)
- Mirjana Karanović (born 1957)
- Boris Komnenić (1957–2021)
- Olga Odanović (born 1958)
- Zoran Cvijanović (born 1958)
- Radoslav Milenković (born 1958)
- Branimir Brstina (born 1960)
- Tihomir Stanić (born 1960)
- Žarko Laušević (born 1960)
- Svetislav Goncić (born 1960)
- Lolita Davidovich (born 1961), American actress, True Detective
- Catharine Oxenberg (born 1961), American TV actress (Serbian mother Princess Elisabeth of Yugoslavia)
- Sonja Savić (1961–2008)
- Milorad Mandić (1961–2016)
- Dubravko Jovanović (born 1961)
- Predrag Bjelac (born 1962)
- Slavko Labović (born 1962)
- Dragoljub Ljubičić (born 1962)
- Anica Dobra (born 1963), actress who won Bavarian Film Awards "Best Young Actress" for Rosamunde, cast in German Love Scenes from Planet Earth
- Dragan Bjelogrlić (born 1963)
- Branka Pujić (born 1963)
- Srđan Žika Todorović (born 1965)
- Slobodan Ninković (born 1965)
- Dragan Jovanović (born 1965)
- Marko Todorović (born 1965)
- Vesna Trivalić (born 1965)
- Dejan Čukić (born 1966)
- Nikola Pejaković (born 1966)
- Boris Isaković (born 1966)
- Jasna Đuričić (born 1966)
- Nikola Kojo (born 1967)
- Mirjana Joković (born 1967)
- Anita Mančić (born 1968)
- Dubravka Mijatović (born 1968)
- Nebojša Glogovac (1969–2018)
- Dragan Mićanović (born 1970)
- Branka Katić (born 1970)
- Goran Kostić (born 1971)
- Vojin Ćetković (born 1971)
- Boris Milivojević (born 1971)
- Nenad Jezdić (born 1972)
- Nataša Ninković (born 1972)
- Katarina Žutić (born 1972)
- Sergej Trifunović (born 1972)
- Vjera Mujović (born 1972)
- Sasha Alexander (born 1973), Hollywood actress (Dawson's Creek, Rizzoli and Isles), daughter-in-law of Sophia Loren
- Adrienne Janic (born 1974)
- Nikola Đuričko (born 1974)
- Miloš Samolov (born 1974)
- Miloš Timotijević (born 1975)
- Milla Jovovich (born 1975)
- Nataša Tapušković (born 1975)
- Ben Mulroney (born 1976)
- Ljubomir Bandović (born 1976)
- Ursula Yovich (born 1977), Australian actress of Serbian-Aboriginal origin
- Gordan Kičić (born 1977)
- Branislav Trifunović (born 1978)
- Andrija Milošević (born 1978)
- Marinko Madžgalj (1978–2016)
- Stefan Kapičić (born 1978)
- Stana Katić (born 1978), Canadian born Hollywood actress, featured in TV series Castle
- Vuk Kostić (born 1979)
- Ivan Bosiljčić (born 1979)
- Branko Tomović (born 1980)
- Sonja Kolačarić (born 1980)
- Sarah Sokolovic (born 1980)
- Sloboda Mićalović (born 1981)
- Bojana Novakovic (born 1981)
- Marija Karan (born 1982)
- Holly Valance (born 1983), Australian actress and singer, Serbian father
- Petar Benčina (born 1984), actor
- Danica Curcic (born 1985), Danish actress, Serbian parentage
- Nataša Petrović (born 1988)
- Miloš Biković (born 1988)
- Nataša Petrović (born 1988)
- Jelisaveta Orašanin (born 1988)
- Tamara Dragičević (born 1989)
- Mirka Vasiljević (born 1992)
- Nataša Stanković (born 1992), Bollywood Actress, Dancer and Model
- Olympia Valance (born 1993), Australian actress and model, Serbian father

==== Film/TV directors and screenwriters ====
- Svetozar Botorić (1857–1916), owner of Serbia's first movie theatre, the Paris Cinema
- Slavko Vorkapić (1894–1976), director and editor
- Ognjenka Milićević (1927–2008)
- Aleksandar Petrović (1929–1994), film director
- Dušan Makavejev (1932–2019), film director and screenwriter.
- Đorđe Kadijević (born 1933), film and TV director
- Boro Drašković (born 1935), director
- Gordan Mihić (1938–2019)
- Peter Bogdanovich (born 1939), director
- Gojko Mitić (born 1940), director
- Steve Tesich (1942–1996), Oscar-winning screenwriter and playwright
- Želimir Žilnik (born 1942), director, Golden Bear winner at the Berlin International Film Festival
- Slobodan Pavićević (born 1945), film and TV production manager and producer
- Slobodan Šijan (born 1946), director
- Goran Paskaljević (born 1947), director
- Dušan Kovačević (born 1948), director and writer
- Božidar Zečević (born 1948), film historian and critic
- Nebojša Pajkić (born 1951)
- Emir Kusturica (born 1954), filmmaker, actor, writer and musician
- Predrag Bambić (born 1958), film and television cinematographer and producer
- Dragoslav Bokan (born 1961)
- Goran Gajić (born 1962), director
- Srđan Dragojević (born 1963), director
- Sven Stojanovic (born 1969), Swedish TV director
- Đorđe Milosavljević (born 1969)
- Srdan Golubović (born 1972), director
- Vladimir Perišić (born 1976), director
- Stefan Arsenijević (born 1977), director, Golden Bear winner at the Berlin International Film Festival
- Michael Jelenic (born 1977)
- Mila Turajlić (born 1979), documentary filmmaker
- Boris Malagurski (born 1988), documentary filmmaker
- Dušan Lazarević

==== Designers ====
- Zoran Ladicorbic (born 1947), Serbian-born American fashion designer
- Verica Rakocević (born 1948), fashion designer
- Miljen Kljaković (born 1950), award-winning production designer
- Sacha Lakic (born 1964), Serbian-born French automotive and furniture designer
- Konstantin Grcic (born 1965), industrial designer
- Jelena Behrend (born 1968), Serbian-born American jewelry designer
- Marek Djordjevic (born 1969), automobile designer
- Marijana Matthäus (born 1971), Serbian fashion designer
- Elena Karaman Karić (born 1971), interior designer, furniture designer
- Aleksandar Protić (born 1973), fashion designer
- Ana Šekularac (born 1974), British fashion designer of Serbian descent
- Boris Nikolić (1974–2008), fashion designer
- Roksanda Ilincic (born 1975), Serbian-born British fashion designer
- Zvonko Marković (born 1975), fashion designer
- Gorjana Reidel (born 1978), Serbian-born American jewelry designer
- Ivana Sert (born 1979), swimsuit designer, television presenter, model
- Bojana Sentaler, Serbian-born Canadian fashion designer
- Bata Spasojević, fashion designer
- Ines Janković (born 1983), fashion designer
- Ana Kras (born 1984), Serbian-born American fashion and furniture designer, photographer
- Ana Ljubinković (born 1985), fashion designer
- Mihailo Anušić (born 1985), fashion designer
- Sonja Jocić (born 1988), fashion designer
- Nevena Ivanović (born 1992), fashion designer
- George Styler, Serbian-born American fashion designer
- Rushka Bergman, Serbian-born American fashion stylist and editor
- Jovan Jelovac, founder and director of Belgrade Design Week
- Ivana Pilja, fashion designer
- Ana Rajcevic, fashion artist
- Aleksandra Lalić, fashion designer
- Evica Milovanov-Penezic, glove designer

==== Models ====
- Zlata Petković (1954–2012)
- Aleksandra Melnichenko (born 1977),model and pop group member, wife of Andrey Melnichenko
- Nataša Vojnović (born 1979), fashion model
- Maja Latinović (born 1980), fashion model
- Dragana Atlija (born 1983), model and actress
- Sanja Papić (born 1984), Miss Serbia and Montenegro at the Miss Universe 2002
- Sara Brajovic (born 1985) French fashion model
- Tijana Arnautović (born 1986), Miss World Canada
- Vedrana Grbović (born 1987), model and beauty pageant winner
- Danijela Dimitrovska (born 1987), Serbian fashion model
- Georgina Stojiljković (born 1988), Serbian fashion model
- Olya Ivanisevic (born 1988), Serbian fashion model
- Aleksandra Nikolić (born 1990), Serbian fashion model
- Mila Miletic (born 1991), Serbian fashion model
- Sofija Milošević (born 1991), Serbian fashion model
- Andreja Pejic (born 1991), Australian fashion model
- Veruska Ljubisavljević (born 1991), Miss Venezuela 2018
- Anđelka Tomašević (born 1993), model and beauty pageant winner
- Sara Mitić (born 1995), model and beauty pageant winner

==== Dancers and choreographers ====
- Olgivanna Lloyd Wright (1898–1985), granddaughter of Marko Miljanov and wife of Frank Lloyd Wright
- Nick Kosovich (1909–1947), ballroom dancer and actor
- George Zoritch (1917–2009), Russian dancer and teacher of Serbian antecedents
- Milorad Mišković (1928–2013), ballet dancer and choreographer, honorary president of UNESCO International Dance Council
- Jelena Tinska (born 1953), actress and ballerina
- Mia Čolak-Slavenska, prima ballerina
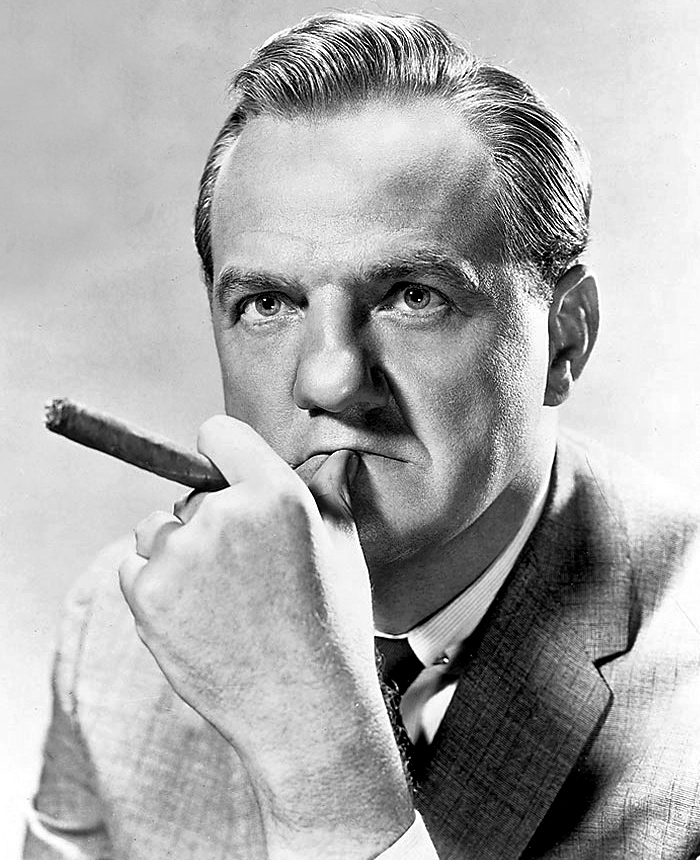
Karl Malden (born: Mladen Sekulović) won an Academy-Award and a number of other awards.

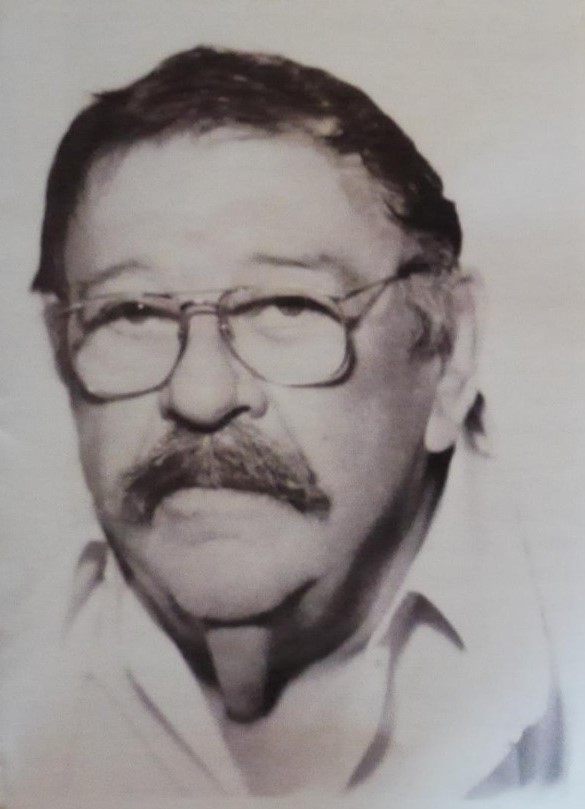
Pavle Vuisić is one of the most recognizable faces of Yugoslav cinema.

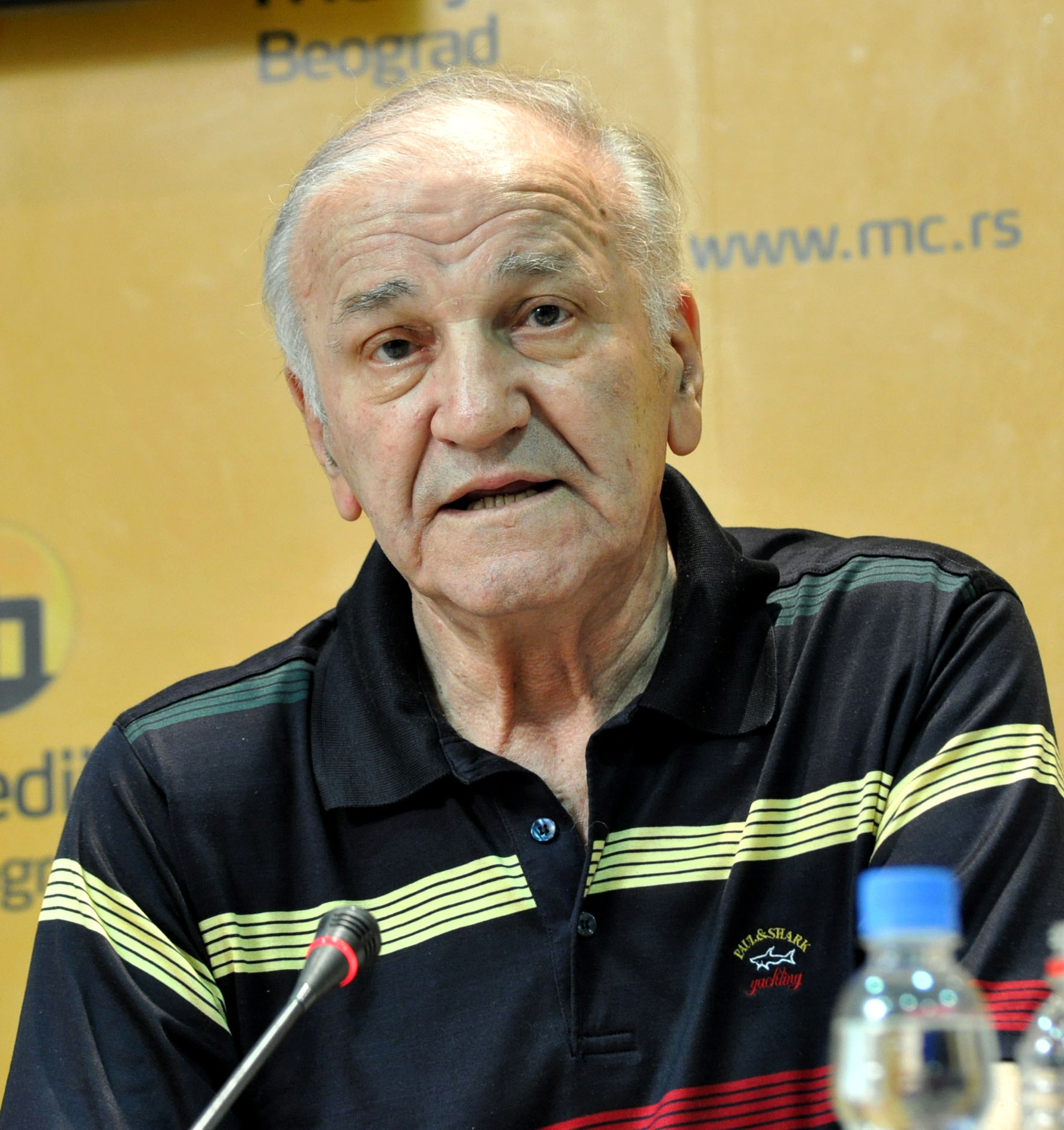
Bata Živojinović acted in more than 340 films and TV series, and is regarded as one of the best actors in former Yugoslavia.

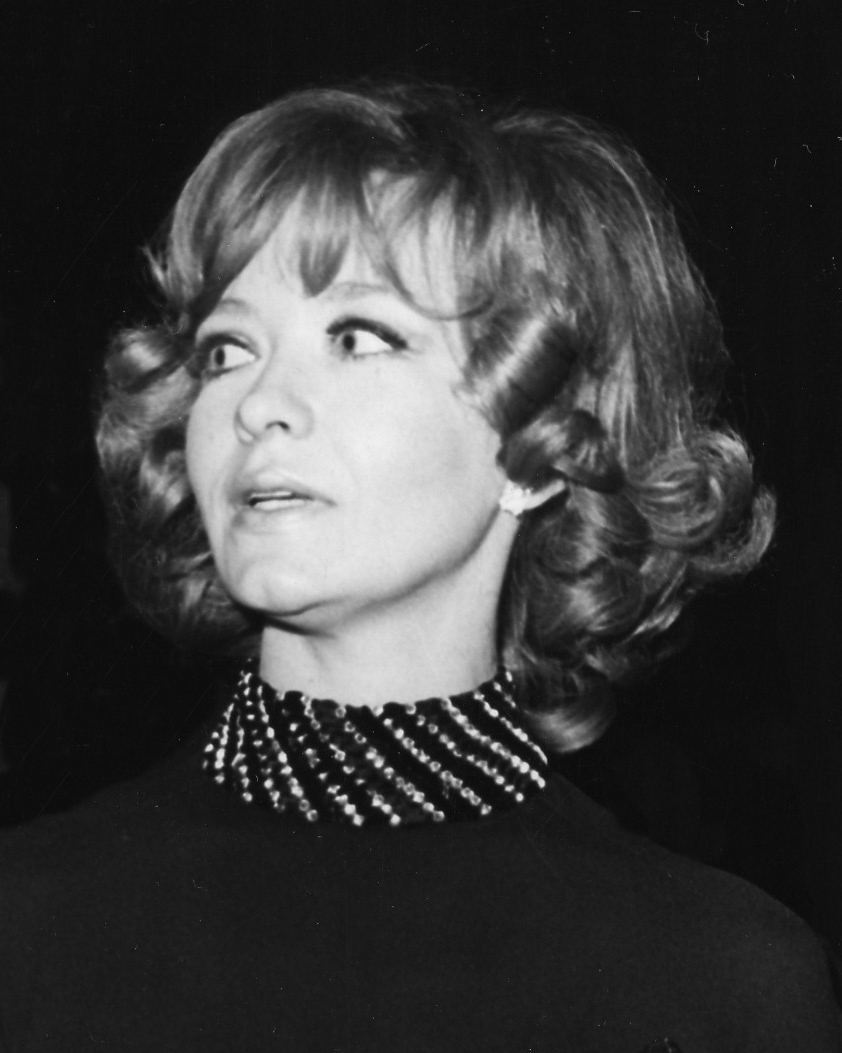
Milena Dravić was a well-known actress who won the Cannes Film Festival Award for Best Actress.

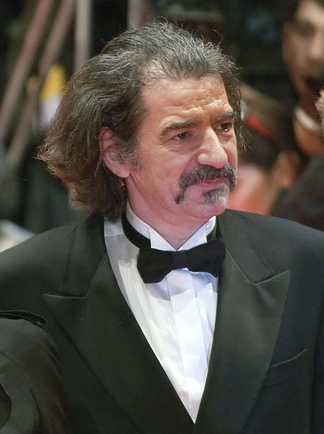
Miki Manojlović starred in many European films.

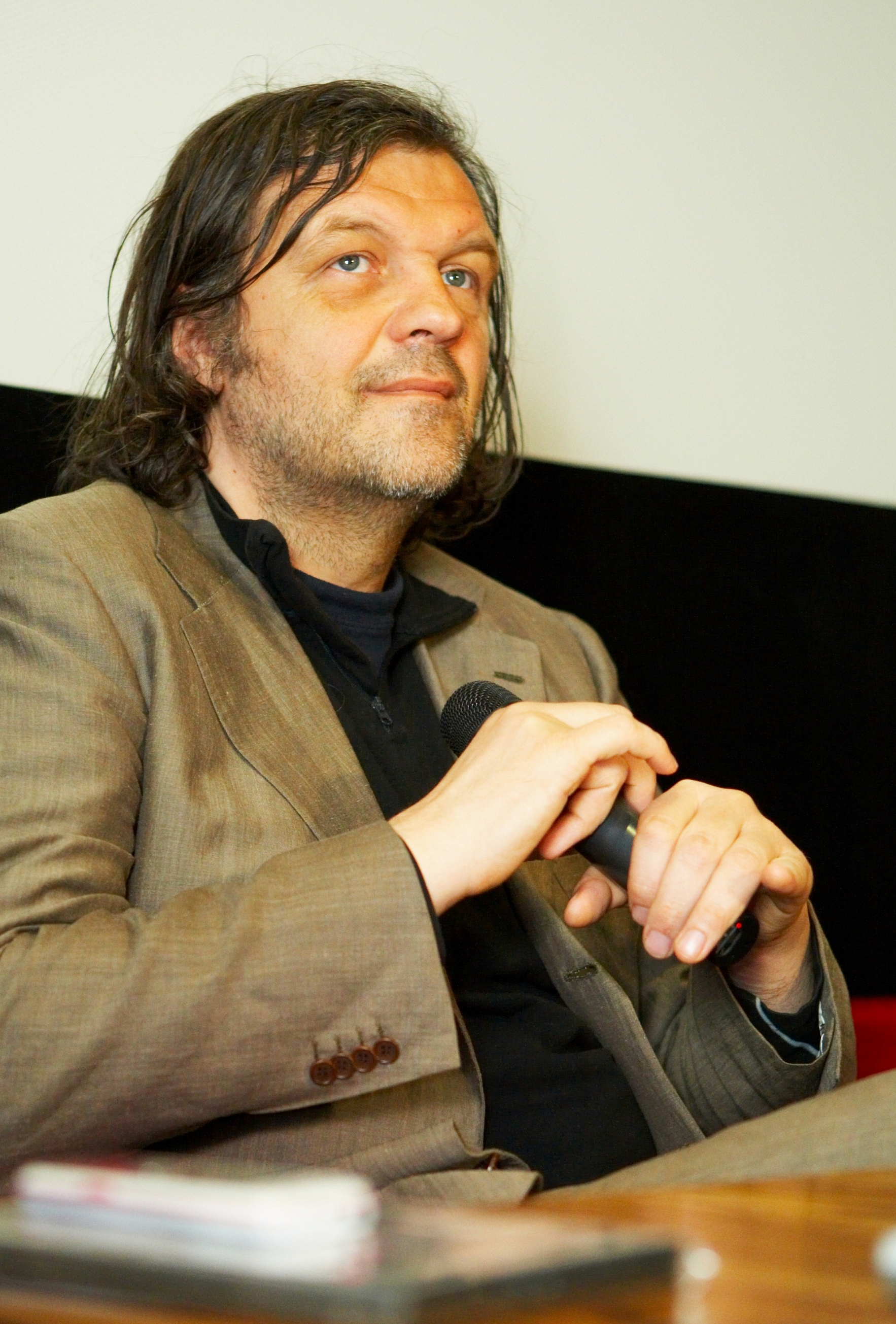
Emir Kusturica won Palme d'Or twice.

=== Literature ===
==== Writers ====
- Buća, noble family, originating in Kotor during the Middle Ages. Some of their antecedents were writers and poets.
- Miroslav of Hum, 12th-century Great Prince (Велики Жупан) of Zachlumia from 1162 to 1190, an administrative division (appanage) of the medieval Serbian Principality (Rascia) covering Herzegovina and southern Dalmatia.
- Anonymous author of the Chronicle of the Priest of Duklja, a 12th-century literary work, preserved in its Latin version only, has all the indication that it was written in Old Slavic, or, at least, that a portion of the material included in it existed previously in the Slavic language.
- Stefan Nemanja (1113–1199), issued an edict called the "Hilandar Charter" for the newly established Serbian monastery at Mount Athos.
- Stefan the First-Crowned (1165–1228), wrote "The Life of Stefan Nemanja", a biography of his father.
- Saint Sava (1174–1236), Serbian royalty and Archbishop, author of oldest known Serbian constitution – the Zakonopravilo. Also, he authored Karyes Typikon in 1199 and Studenica Typikon in 1208.
- Monk Simeon (c. 1170 – 1230), wrote Vukan's Gospel.
- Atanasije (scribe) (c. 1200 – 1265), a disciple of Saint Sava, was a Serbian monk-scribe who wrote a "Hymn to Saint Sava" and a "Eulogy to Saint Sava".
- Grigorije the Pupil, author of Miroslav Gospel and Miroslav of Hum commissioned it.
- Domentijan (c. 1210–died after 1264), Serbian scholar and writer. For most of his life, he was a monk dedicated to writing biographies of clerics, including "Life of St. Sava."
- Bratko Menaion, represents the oldest Serbian transcription of this liturgical book, discovered in the village of Banvani, and written by presbyter Bratko during the reign of king Stefan Vladislav I of Serbia in 1234.
- Stefan Uroš I of Serbia (1223–1277), author of the Ston Charter (1253).
- Theodosius the Hilandarian (1246–1328), technically the first Serbian novelist, wrote biographies of Saint Sava and St. Simeon
- Grigorije II of Ras (1250–1321), monk-scribe
- Nikodim I (c. 1250 – 1325), Abbot of Hilandar (later Serbian Archbishop), issued an edict (gramma) wherein he grants to the monks of the Kelion of St. Sava in Karyes a piece of land and an abandoned monastery. He translated numerous ancient texts and wrote some poetry. Also, he wrote Rodoslov (The Lives of Serbian Kings and Bishops).
- Dragolj Code, written in 1259 by Serbian monk Dragolj.
- Stanislav of Lesnovo (c. 1280 – 1350), wrote "Oliver's Menologion" in Serbia in 1342.
- Jakov of Serres (1300–1365), author of Triodion.
- Elder Grigorije (fl. 1310–1355), Serbian nobleman and monk, possibly "Danilo's pupil" (Danilov učenik), i.e. the main author of "Žitija kraljeva i arhiepiskopa srpskih".
- Isaija the Monk (14th century), translated the works of Pseudo-Dionysius the Areopagite.
- Anonymous Athonite (also known in Serbia as Nepoznati Svetogorac; late 14th to mid-15th century) was Isaija the Monk's biographer and one of the many unidentified authors of Medieval works.
- Elder Siluan (14th century), author of a hymn to Saint Sava. Hesychasm left a strong imprint in Serbian medieval literature and art, which is evident in works by Domentijan and Teodosije the Hilandarian, but most prominently in the writings of Danilo of Peć, Isaija the Monk and Elder Siluan.
- Stefan Dušan (1308–1355), author of Dušan's Code, the second oldest preserved constitution of Serbia.
- Jefimija (1310–1405), daughter of Caesar Vojihna and widow of Jovan Uglješa Mrnjavčević, took monastic vows and is the author of three found works, including "Praise to Prince Lazar". One of the earliest European female writers.
- Jefrem (patriarch) (c. 1312 – 1400), born in a priestly family, of Bulgarian origin, was the Patriarch of the Serbian Orthodox Church, from 1375 to 1379 and from 1389 to 1392. He was also a poet who left a large body of work, preserved in a 14th-century manuscript from Hilandar Monastery.
- Dorotej of Hilandar, wrote a charter for the monastery of Drenča in 1382.
- Rajčin Sudić (1335 – after 1360), Serbian monk-scribe who lived during the time of Lord Vojihna, the father of Jefimija.
- Cyprian, Metropolitan of Moscow (1336–1406), Bulgarian-born, Serbian clergyman who as the Metropolitan of Moscow wrote The Book of Degrees (Stepénnaya kniga), which grouped Russian monarchs in the order of their generations. The book was published in 1563.
- Saint Danilo II, wrote biographies of Serbian medieval rulers, including the biography of Jelena, the wife of King Stefan Dragutin.
- Antonije Bagaš, translated works from Greek into Serbian.
- Euthymius of Tarnovo, founder of the Tarnovo Literary School that standardized the literary texts of all Orthodox Slavs, including those in Serbia and in Kievan Rus (Ukraine, Belarus, and Russia).
- Nikola Radonja (c. 1330 – 1399), as monk Gerasim, served and helped with great merit Hilandar and other monasteries at Mount Athos, and authored "Gerasim Chronicle" (Gerasimov letopis).
- Princess Milica (1335–1405), consort of Prince Lazar. One of the earliest European female writers.
- Psalter of Branko Mladenović, dated 1346.
- Vrhobreznica Chronicle, also written between 1350 and 1400 by an anonymous monk-scribe.
- Jefrem (patriarch), twice Serbian patriarch, though Bulgarian born. He was also a poet.
- Maria Angelina Doukaina Palaiologina (1350–1394), Serbian writer.
- Gregory Tsamblak (fl. 1409–1420), Bulgarian writer and cleric, abbot of Serbia's Visoki Dečani, wrote A Biography of and Service to St. Stephen Uroš III Dečanski of Serbia, and On the Transfer of Relics of Saint Paraskeva to Serbia.
- Danilo III, Patriarch of the Serbs (c. 1350 – 1400), Serbian patriarch and writer. He wrote Slovo o knezu Lazaru (Narrative About Prince Lazar).
- Nikola Stanjević (fl. 1355), commissioned monk Feoktist to write Tetravangelion at the Hilandar monastery, now on exhibit at the British Museum in London, collection No. 154.
- Jelena Balšić (1366–1443), educated Serbian noblewoman, who wrote the Gorički zbornik, correspondence between her and Nikon of Jerusalem, a monk in Gorica monastery (Jelena's monastic foundation) on Beška (Island) in Zeta under the Balšići.
- Stefan Lazarević (1374–1427), Knez/Despot of Serbia (1389–1427), wrote biographies and poetry, one of the most important Serbian medieval writers. He founded the Resava School at Manasija monastery.
- Đurađ Branković (1377–1456), author psalter Oktoih, published posthumously in 1494 by Hieromonk Makarije, the founder of Serbian and Romanian printing.
- Kir Joakim, late 14th century musical writer.
- Dečani Chronicle, written by an anonymous monk, also from the Resava School made famous by Manasija monastery. Rewritten and published in 1864 by Archimandrite Serafim Ristić of the Dečani Monastery
- Oxford Serbian Psalter, written by an anonymous monk-scribe.
- Munich Serbian Psalter, written by an anonymous monk-scribe.
- Tomić Psalter, named after Simon Tomić, a Serbian art collector, found the 14th century illuminated manuscript in Old Serbia in 1901.
- Dorotheus of Hilandar, author of a charter for the monastery of Drenča (1382).
- Romylos of Vidin, also known as Romylos of Ravanica where he died in the late 1300s.
- Kir Stefan the Serb (late 14th and early 15th century), Serbian monk-scribe and composer.
- Nikola the Serb (late 14th and early 15th century), Serbian monk-scribe and composer.
- Isaiah the Serb, monk-scribe and composer of chants in the 15th century. He finished the translation from Greek to Serbian of the Corpus Areopagiticum, the works of Pseudo-Dionysius the Areopagite, in 1371, and transcribed the manuscripts of Joachim, Domestikos of Serbia.
- Danilo III (patriarch), writer and poet.
- Constantine of Kostenets (fl. 1380–1431), Bulgarian writer and chronicler who lived in Serbia, author of the biography of Despot Stefan Lazarević and of the first Serbian philological study, Skazanije o pismenah (A History on the Letters).
- Kantakuzina Katarina Branković (1418/19–1492), remembered for commissioning the Varaždin Apostol in 1454.
- Radoslav Gospels, work of both Celibate Priest Feodor, also known as "Inok from Dalsa" (fl. 1428–1429), who is credited for transcribing the Radoslav Gospel (Tetraevangelion) in the Serbian recension, now in the National Library of Russia in St. Petersburg. Radoslav is the famed miniaturist who illuminated the pages.
- Jelena Balšić's correspondence with monk Nikon of Jerusalem between 1441 and 1442 is found in Gorički zbornik, named after the island of Gorica in Lake Skadar where Jelena built a church.
- Dimitrije Kantakuzin, while residing in the Rila monastery in 1469 Kantakuzin wrote a biography of Saint John of Rila and a touching "Prayer to the Holy Virgin" imploring her aid in combating sin.
- Konstantin Mihailović (c. 1430 – 1501), the last years of his life were spent in Poland where he wrote his Turkish Chronicle, an interesting document with a detailed description of the historical events of that period as well as various customs of the Turks and Christians.
- Pachomius the Serb (Paxomij Logofet), prolific hagiographer who came from Mount Athos to work in Russia between 1429 and 1484. He wrote eleven saint's lives (zhitie) while employed by the Russian Orthodox Church in Novgorod. He was one of the representatives of the ornamental style known as pletenje slova (word-braiding).
- Dimitar of Kratovo, 15th-century Serb writer and lexicographer of the Kratovo Literary School.
- Ninac Vukoslavić (fl. 1450–1459), chancellor and scribe at the court of Scanderbeg, and author of his letters.
- Deacon Damian who wrote "Koporin Chronicle" in 1453.
- Vladislav the Grammarian (fl. 1456–1483), Serbian monk, writer, historian and theologian.
- Dimitar of Kratovo was a 15th-century Serb writer and lexicographer, one of the most important members of the Kratovo literary school.
- Martin Segon was a Serbian writer, Catholic Bishop of Ulcinj and a 15th-century humanist.
- Lazar of Hilandar After Pachomius the Serb, the most significant Serbian monk in Imperial Russia.
- Benedikt Kuripečič (1491–1531) was the first to record part of the folk songs of the Battle of Kosovo dealing with Miloš Obilić's exploits.
- Stefan Paštrović (fl. 1560–1599), author of two books, engaged a certain hieromonk Sava of Visoki Dečani to print them in Venice at the Francesco Rampazetto and Heirs publishing house in 1597.
- Jakov of Kamena Reka (fl. 1564–1572), worked in the Vuković printing house in Venice with Vićenco Vuković, son of Božidar.
- Radiša Dimitrović owned the Belgrade printing house where many medieval works were published.
- Peja (priest) wrote a poem In the Court and in the Dungeon, from The Service of Saint George of Kratovo, and a biography of the same saint between 1515 and 1523.
- Teodor Ljubavić wrote the Goražde Psalter in 1521.
- Tronoša Chronicle was written in 1526 and transcribed by hieromonk Josif Tronoša in the eighteenth century.
- Jovan Maleševac was a Serbian Orthodox monk and scribe who collaborated in 1561 with the Slovene Protestant reformer Primož Trubar to print religious books in Cyrillic.
- Matija Popović was a 16th-century Serbian Orthodox cleric from Ottoman Bosnia who also supported the Reformation movement.
- Peter Petrovics was a 16th-century Serbian magnate and one of Hungary's most influential and fervent supporters of the Reformation.
- Teodor Račanin (Bajina Bašta, c. 1500–Bajina Bašta, past-1560) was the first Serbian writer and monk of the Rachan Scriptorium School mentioned in Ottoman and Serbian sources.
- Dimitrije Ljubavić (1519–1563) was a Serbian Orthodox deacon, humanist, writer, and printer who sought to bring a rapprochement between the Lutherans and the Eastern Orthodox Church.
- Jovan the Serb of Kratovo (1526–1583) was a Serbian writer and monk whose name is preserved as the author of six books, now part of the Museum Collection of the Serbian Orthodox Church.
- Inok Sava (c. 1530 – after 1597) was the first to write and publish a Serbian Primer (syllabary) at the printing press of Giovanni Antonio Rampazetto in Venice in two editions, first on 20 May and the second on 25 May 1597, after which the book somehow fell into neglect only to be rediscovered recently.
- Pajsije I Janjevac (1542–1649) was a Serbian Patriarch and an author whose works showed an admixture of popular elements.
- Georgije Mitrofanović (c. 1550 – 1630) was a Serbian Orthodox monk and painter whose work can be seen in the church at the Morača monastery.
- Mavro Orbin (1563–1614) was the author of the "Realm of the Slavs" (1601) which made a significant impact on Serbian historiography, influencing future historians, particularly Đorđe Branković (count).
- Zograf Longin (16th century), was an icon painter and writer.
- Jakov of Kamena Reka worked in the Vuković printing house in Venice with Vićenco Vuković.
- Mariano Bolizza (fl. 1614) was a prominent Serbian writer who also wrote in Italian.
- Đorđe Branković, Count of Podgorica (1645–1711), who wrote the first history of Serbia in five volumes.
- Radul of Riđani (fl. 1650–1666) was a Serbian Orthodox priest and chieftain of Riđani, and a prolific letter writer who kept the authorities of Perast informed about Ottoman preparations for the Battle of Perast. A collection of his letters are kept in a museum.
- Kiprijan Račanin (c. 1650 – 1730) was a Serbian writer and monk who founded a copyist school in Szentendre in Hungary, like the one he left behind at the Rača monastery in Serbia at the beginning of the Great Turkish War in 1689.
- Jerotej Račanin (c. 1650 – after 1727) was a Serbian writer and copyist of church manuscripts and books. After visiting Jerusalem in 1704 he wrote a book about his travel experiences from Hungary to the Holy Land and back.
- John of Tobolsk (1651–1715) was a cleric born in Nizhyn, in the Czernihow Voivodeship of the Polish–Lithuanian Commonwealth of the time, now revered as a saint.
- Čirjak Račanin (Bajina Bašta, c. 1660 – Szentendre, 1731) was a writer and monk, a member of the famed "School of Rača".
- Sava Vladislavich (1669–1738), framed Peter the Great's proclamation of 1711, translated Mavro Orbin's Il regno de gli Slavi (1601); The Realm of the Slavs) from Italian into Russian, and composed the Treaty of Kiakhta and many others
- Gavril Stefanović Venclović (fl. Bajina Bašta, 1670 – Szentendre, 1749), one of the first and most notable representatives of Serbian Baroque and Enlightenment literature, wrote in the vernacular. Milorad Pavić saw Venclović as a living link between the Byzantine literary tradition and the emerging new views on modern literature. He was the precursor of enlightenment aiming, most of all, to educate the common folk.
- Ivan Krušala (1675–1735) is best known for writing a poem about the Battle of Perast in 1654, among others. He worked in a Russian embassy in China at the time when Sava Vladislavich was the ambassador.
- Simeon Končarević (c. 1690 – 1769), a writer and Bishop of Dalmatia who, exiled twice from his homeland, settled in Russia where he wrote his chronicles.
- Parteniy Pavlovich (c. 1695 – 1760) was a Serbian Orthodox Church cleric of Bulgarian origin who championed South Slavic revival.
- Danilo I, Metropolitan of Cetinje (1697–1735) was a writer and founder of the Petrović Njegoš dynasty.
- Sava Petrović (1702–1782) wrote numerous letters to the Moscow metropolitan and the Empress Elizabeth of Russia about the deploring conditions of the Serb Nation under occupation by the Turks, Republic of Venice and the Habsburg Empire.
- Pavle Nenadović (1703–1768) was commissioned by Serbian Orthodox Metropolitan of Karlovci, Arsenije IV Jovanović Šakabenta to compose a heraldic book, Stemmatographia.
- Tomo Medin (1725–1788) was a Montenegrin Serb writer and adventurer. He and Casanova had two duels together.
- Zaharije Orfelin (1726–1785), one of the most notable representatives of the Serbian Baroque in art and literature
- Jovan Rajić (1726–1801), writer, historian, traveler, and pedagogue, who wrote the first systematic work on the history of Croats and Serbs
- Mojsije Putnik (1728–1790), Metropolitan, educator, writer, and founder of secondary schools and institutions of higher learning.
- Kiril Zhivkovich (1730–1807) was a Serbian and Bulgarian writer.
- Pavle Julinac (1730–1785) was a writer, historian, traveler, soldier, and diplomat.
- Simeon Piščević (1731–1797), was a writer and high-ranking officer in the service of Austria and Imperial Russia.
- Dositej Obradović (1739–1811), influential protagonist of the Serbian national and cultural renaissance, founder of modern Serbian literature
- Nikola Nešković (1740–1789) was a most prolific Serbian icon, fresco and portrait painter in the Baroque style.
- Stefan von Novaković (c. 1740 – 1826) was a Serbian writer and publisher of Serbian books in Vienna and patron of Serbian literature.
- Teodor Janković-Mirijevski (1740–1814), the most influential educational reformer in the Habsburg Empire and Imperial Russia
- Jovan Muškatirović (1743–1809) was one of the early disciples of Dositej Obradović.
- Teodor Ilić Češljar (1746–1793) was one of the best late Baroque Serbian painters from the region of Vojvodina.
- Petar I Petrović Njegoš (1748–1830) was a writer and poet besides being a spiritual and temporal ruler of the "Serb land of Montenegro" as he called it.
- Vićentije Rakić (1750–1818) was a writer and poet. He founded the School of Theology (now part of the University of Belgrade).
- Stefano Zannowich (1751–1786) was a Montenegrin Serb writer and adventurer. From his early youth, he was prone to challenges and adventures, unruly and dissipated life. He wrote in Italian and French, besides Serbian. He is known for his "Turkish Letters" that fascinated his contemporaries. His works belong to the genre of epistolary novel.
- Hadži-Ruvim (1752–1804) was a Serbian Orthodox archimandrite who documented events and wars in his time, established a private library, wrote library bibliographies, collected books in which he drew ornaments and miniatures. He did wood carving and woodcutting.
- Gerasim Zelić (1752–1828), Serbian Orthodox Church archimandrite, traveller and writer (compatriot of Dositej). His chief work was the travel memoirs Žitije (Lives), which also served as a sociological work.
- Tripo Smeća (1755–1812), Venetian historian and writer who wrote in Italian and in Serbian.
- Avram Mrazović (1756–1826), writer, translator and pedagogue.
- Emanuilo Janković (1758–1792) was a man of letters and of science.
- Sava Tekelija (1761–1842) was the patron of Matica Srpska, a literary and cultural society
- Gligorije Trlajic (1766–1811), writer, poet, polyglot and professor of law at the universities of St. Petersburg and Kharkov, author of a textbook on Civil Law which according to some laid the foundations of Russian civil law doctrine
- Old Rashko (1770–18??), Romanticism
- Tomo Milinović (1770–1846), writer and freedom-fighter. He authored two books, Umotvorina (published posthumously 1847) and Istorija Slavenskog Primorija (lost and never published).
- Jovan Pačić (1771–1848),poet, writer, translator, painter and soldier. He translated Goethe
- Pavel Đurković (1772–1830), one of the most important Serbian Baroque artists (writers, icon painters, goldsmiths, woodcarvers).
- Joakim Vujić, (1772–1847), writer, dramatist, actor, traveler and polyglot. He is known as the Father of Serbian Theatre.
- Atanasije Stojković (1773–1832) was a writer, pedagogue, physicist, mathematician and astronomer in the service of Imperial Russia. He also taught mathematics at the university of Kharkiv.
- Živana Antonijević (1770s–1828), Romanticism
- Lukijan Mušicki (1777–1837), Serbian Orthodox abbott, poet, prose writer, and polyglot.
- Matija Nenadović (1777–1854) author of Memoirs, an eyewitness account of the First Serbian Uprising in 1804 and the Second Serbian Uprising in 1815.
- Teodor Filipović (1778–1807), writer, jurist and educator, wrote the Decree of the Governing Council of Revolutionary Serbia. He taught at the newly founded National University of Kharkiv, with his compatriots, Gligorije Trlajić and Atanasije Stojković.
- Stevan Živković-Telemak (1780–1831), author of Obnovljene Srbije, 1780–1831 (Serbie nouvelle, 1780–1731) and Serbian translator of François Fénelon's Les Aventures de Telemaque.
- Jovan Došenović (1781–1813), Serbian philosopher, poet and translator.
- Sava Mrkalj (1783–1833), devised an alphabet system, which rejected 16 of 42 Slavonic letters.
- Luka Milovanov Georgijević (1784–1828), considered the first children's poet of new Serbian literature. He collaborated with Vuk Karadžić on the production of grammars and the dictionary.
- Vuk Stefanović Karadžić (1787–1864), Romanticism
- Sofronije Jugović-Marković (fl. 1789), Serbian writer and activist in Russian service. He wrote "Serbian Empire and State" in 1792 in order to raise the patriotic spirit of the Serbs in both the Habsburg and Ottoman empires.
- Dimitrije Davidović (1789–1838), Minister of Education of the Principality of Serbia, writer, journalist, publisher, historian, diplomatist, and founder of modern Serbian journalism and publishing.
- Sima Milutinović Sarajlija (1791–1847), poet, hajduk, translator, historian, philologist, diplomat and adventurer.
- Georgije Magarašević (1793–1830), eminent writer, historian, dramatist, publisher, and founder and first editor of Serbski Letopis.
- Jovan Hadžić (1799–1869), Serbian writer and legislator
- Prokopije Čokorilo (1802–1866) is known for his chronicles and a dictionary of Turkish expressions in Serbian. He contributed to the Srbsko-dalmatinski Magazin.
- Jovan Stejić (1803–1853), Serbian physician writer, philosopher, translator, and a critic of Vuk Karadžić's language reform.
- Pavle Stamatović (1805–1864)
- Jovan Sterija Popović, (1806–1856), playwright, poet and pedagogue who taught at the Velika škola in Belgrade.
- Stefan Stefanović (1807–1828). Serbian writer who lived and worked in Novi Sad and Budapest
- Božidar Petranović (1809–1874), Realism
- Nikanor Grujić, (1810–1887), Rationalism to Romanticism
- Petar II Petrović-Njegoš, (1813–1851) works include The Mountain Wreath (Горски вијенац / Gorski vijenac), the Ray of the Microcosm (Луча микрокозма / Luča mikrokozma), the Serbian Mirror (Огледало српско / Ogledalo srpsko), and False Tsar Stephen the Little (Лажни цар Шћепан Мали / Lažni car Šćepan Mali).
- Ognjeslav Utješenović (1817–1890), Rationalism to Romanticism
- Matija Ban (1818–1903), writer, poet, dramatist, politician and diplomat
- Vasa Živković (1819–1891), Rationalism to Romanticism
- Medo Pucić (1821–1882), writer and prominent Serbian nationalist who was one of the leaders of the "Serb-Catholic" Circle.
- Jovan Đorđević (1826–1900), Serbian man of letters, writer of lyrics to the Serbian National anthem
- Svetozar Miletić (1826–1901), writer and editor of a magazine called Slavjanka, in which Serbian students living under Habsburg occupation championed their ideas of national freedom
- Ljubomir Nenadović (1826–1895), writer
- Milorad Pavlović-Krpa (1865–1957), was merchant and writer of epic songs who wrote the earliest collection of urban lyric poetry., writer and early Anton Chekhov translator
- Tešan Podrugović (1775–1815), Romanticism
- Filip Višnjić (1767–1834), Romanticism
- Sava Mrkalj (1783–1833), Romanticism
- Pavle Stamatović (1805–1864)
- Đorđe Marković Koder (1806–1891), Romanticism
- Vuk Vrčević (1811–1882), collaborated with Vuk Karadžić collecting Serbian tales and songs in Montenegro, Bosnia and Herzegovina and Dalmatia along with Vuk Popović
- Mirko Petrović-Njegoš (1820–1867), Romanticism
- Dimitrije Matić (1821–1884)
- Jakov Ignjatović (1822–1889), Realism
- Visarion Ljubiša (1823–1884), Romanticism
- Branko Radičević (1824–1853), Romanticism
- Stjepan Mitrov Ljubiša (1824–1878), Romanticism
- Jovan Sundečić (1825–1900), Romanticism
- Nikša Gradi (1825–1894), Romanticism
- Novak Radonić (1826–1890), Romanticism
- Bogoboj Atanacković (1826–1858)
- Ljubomir Nenadović (1826–1895), Realism
- Milica Stojadinović Srpkinja (1828–1878), Romanticism
- Ivan Stojanović (1829–1900), Romanticism
- Gavrilo Vitković (1829–1902), Realism
- Staka Skenderova (1831–1891), Romanticism, a Bosnian Serb writer, teacher and social worker.
- Milan Đ. Milićević (1831–1908), Realism
- Đura Jakšić (1832–1878), Romanticism
- Ilarion Ruvarac (1832–1905), Romanticism
- Nićifor Dučić (1832–1900), Realism
- Vaso Pelagić (1833–1899), Romanticism
- Vladimir Jovanović (1833–1922), Realism
- Marko Miljanov (1833–1901), Romanticism
- Pero Budmani (1835–1914), Romanticism
- Kosta Ruvarac (1837–1864), Realism
- Ljudevit Vuličević (1839–1916)
- Miloš Crnjanski (1893–1977)
- Laza Kostić (1841–1910), Romanticism
- Nicholas I of Montenegro (1841–1921), Romanticism
- Stojan Novaković (1842–1915)
- Čedomilj Mijatović (1842–1932), Romanticism
- Evgenije Popović (1842–1931)
- Kosta Trifković (1843–1875), Romanticism
- Svetomir Nikolajević (1844–1922), Realism
- Vladan Đorđević (1844–1930), Realism
- Nikodim Milaš (1845–1915), Realism
- Risto Kovačić (1845–1909), Realism
- Svetozar Marković (1846–1875), Realism
- Milovan Glišić (1847–1908), Realism
- Sava Bjelanović (1850–1897), Realism
- Laza Lazarević (1851–1891), Realism
- Dragomir Brzak (1851–1907)
- Simo Matavulj (1852–1908), Realism
- Stevan Sremac (1855–1906), Realism
- Jaša Tomić (1856–1922), Realism
- Ivo Vojnović (1857–1929), Realism
- Ljubomir Nedić (1858–1902), Realism
- Marko Car (1859–1957), Realism
- Vojislav Ilić (1860–1894), Realism
- Milan Rešetar (1860–1942), Realism
- Nikola T. Kašiković (1861–1927)
- Janko Veselinović (writer) (1862–1905), Realism
- Prince Bojidar Karageorgevitch (1862–1908)
- Jelena Dimitrijević (1862–1945)
- Bogdan Popović (1863–1944)
- Antun Fabris (1864–1904), Realism
- Branislav Nušić (1864–1938), Realism to Moderna
- Ilija Vukićević (1866–1899)
- Ivan Ivanić (1867–1935), Realism; a diplomat and an author
- Lujo Bakotić (1867–1941)
- Radoje Domanović (1873–1908), Realism
- Svetozar Ćorović (1875–1919), Realism to Moderna
- Borisav Stanković (1876–1927), Realism
- Petar Kočić (1877–1916), Realism to Moderna
- Jovan Skerlić (1877–1914)
- Isidora Sekulic (1877–1958)
- Kosta Abrašević (1879–1898), Moderna
- Jevto Dedijer (1880–1918), Moderna
- Stijepo Kobasica (1882–1944)
- Vojislav Jovanović Marambo (1884–1968), naturalism, kitchen sink drama
- Dimitrije Mitrinović (1887–1953)
- Mir-Jam (1887–1952)
- Jela Spiridonović-Savić (1890–1974)
- Stanislav Vinaver (1891–1965)
- Vladimir Velmar-Janković (1895–1976)
- Rastko Petrović (1898–1949)
- Branko Ve Poljanski (1898–1947)
- Jovan Popović (1905–1952)
- Vladan Desnica (1905–1967)
- Meša Selimović (1910–1982)
- Grigorije Vitez (1911–1966)
- Mihailo Lalić (1914–1992)
- Branko Ćopić (1915–1984)
- Vojin Jelić (1921–2004)
- Dobrica Ćosić (1921–2014)
- Dejan Medaković (1922–2008)
- Duško Radović (1922–1984)
- Bogdan Bogdanović (1922–2010), essayist
- Milo Dor (1923–2005)
- Mateja Matejić (1924–2018)
- Aleksandar Tišma (1924–2003)
- Draginja Adamović (1925–2000)
- Nenad Petrović (1925–2014)
- Miodrag Pavlović (1928–2014)
- Dragan Lukić (1928–2006)
- Milorad Pavić (1929–2009)
- Radomir Belaćević (1929–2005)
- Ivan Ivanji (1929–2024)
- Borislav Pekić (1930–1992)
- Miodrag Bulatović (1930–1991)
- Dragoslav Mihailović (1930–2023)
- Ivan V. Lalić (1931–1966)
- Jovan Ćirilov (1931–2014)
- B. Wongar (1932-2026), Serbian-Australian novelist, short story writer, poet, anthropologist, humanist, and campaigner for the rights of Australian Aborigines
- Vladimir Voinovich (1932–2018)
- Mika Antić (1932–1986)
- Bora Ćosić (born 1932)
- Slobodan Selenić (1933–1995)
- Živojin Pavlović (1933–1998)
- Duško Trifunović (1933–2006)
- Svetlana Velmar-Janković (1933–2014)
- Sava Babić (1934–2012)
- Grozdana Olujić (1934–2019)
- Danilo Kiš (1935–1989)
- Momo Kapor (1937–2010)
- Branimir Šćepanović (1937–2020)
- Milovan Danojlić (born 1937)
- Mirko Kovač (1938–2013)
- Miroljub Todorović (born 1940)
- Milan Milišić (1941–1991)
- Vida Ognjenović (born 1941)
- Vidosav Stevanović (born 1942)
- Milovan Vitezović (born 1944)
- Pero Zubac (born 1945)
- Raša Papeš (born 1947)
- Dragomir Brajković (1947–2009)
- Jovan Zivlak (born 1947)
- Zoran Živković (born 1948)
- Dušan Kovačević (born 1948)
- Novica Tadić (1949–2011)
- Zoran Spasojević (born 1949)
- Radosav Stojanović (born 1950)
- Svetislav Basara (born 1953)
- Biljana Jovanović (1953–1996)
- Jasmina Tešanović (born 1954)
- Siniša Kovačević (born 1954)
- Radoslav Pavlović (born 1954)
- Vladislav Bajac (born 1954)
- Nenad Prokić (born 1954)
- Dejan Stojanović (born 1959)
- Prvoslav Vujčić (born 1960)
- Goran Petrović (born 1961)
- Vladan Matijević (born 1962)
- Dragomir Dujmov (born 1963)
- Slobodan Savić (born 1964)
- Aleksandar Gatalica (born 1964)
- Uroš Petrović (born 1967)
- Zoran Stefanović (born 1969)
- Branislava Ilić (born 1970)
- Biljana Srbljanović (born 1970)
- Vesna Perić (born 1972)
- Aleksandar Novaković (born 1975)
- Srđan Srdić (born 1977)
- Saša Stanišić (born 1978), Bosnian-German writer, Serbian father
- Barbi Marković (born 1980)
- Olivia Sudjic (born 1988), British fiction writer, Serbian father

==== Poets ====
- Paskoje Primojević (fl. 1482–1527) was a poet and scribe in the Serbian Chancellery in Dubrovnik during the time of the Republic of Ragusa.
- Dimitrije Karaman, born in Lipova, Arad, in the early 1500s, was an early Serbian poet and bard.
- Ludovico Pasquali (Ljudevit Pašković) was an Italian poet and Venetian soldier of Serbian origin, though Roman Catholic by faith, who lived in the early and mid-1500s.
- Hristofor Žefarović (1690–1753), poet who died in Imperial Russia spreading the Pan-Slav culture.
- Vasilije III Petrović-Njegoš (1709–1766), Serbian Orthodox Metropolitan of Montenegro, wrote patriotic poetry and the first history of Montenegro, published in Moscow in 1754
- Jovan Avakumović (1748–1810), known as a representative of the Serbian folk poetry of the 18th century, though he only wrote a few poems which were part of handwritten poem books.
- Pavle Solarić (1779–1821) was Obradović's disciple who wrote poetry and the first book on geography in the vernacular.
- Aleksije Vezilić (1753–1792) was a Serbian lyric poet who introduced the Teutonic vision of the Enlightenment to the Serbs.
- Avram Miletić (1755 – after 1826) was a merchant and writer of epic folk sings.
- Mato Vodopić (1816–1893) was a Serb-Catholic Bishop of Dubrovnik and poet, Romanticism
- Jovan Jovanović Zmaj (1833–1904), Romanticism
- Mileta Jakšić (1863–1935), Realism to Moderna
- Aleksa Šantić (1868–1924), Realism to Moderna
- Jovan Dučić (1871–1943), Moderna
- Milan Rakić (1876–1938), Moderna
- S. Avdo Karabegović (1878–1908)
- Osman Đikić (1879–1912)
- Vladislav Petković Dis (1880–1917), Moderna
- Sima Pandurović (1883–1960), Moderna
- Veljko Petrović (poet) (1884–1967), Moderna
- Momčilo Nastasijević (1894–1938), poet
- Desanka Maksimović (1898–1993)
- Dušan Matić (1898–1980)
- Rade Drainac (1899–1943)
- Dušan Vasiljev (1900–1924)
- Dragan Aleksić (1901–1958), founder of the Yugoslavian branch of Dadaism
- Milan Dedinac (1902–1966)
- Radovan Zogović (1907–1986), leading Serb poet and literary critic from Montenegro
- Milena Pavlović-Barili (1909–1945)
- Oskar Davičo (1909–1989)
- Millosh Gjergj Nikolla (1911–1938), Albanian poet
- Branko Miljković (1934–1961)
- Ljubomir Simović (born 1935)
- Dobrica Erić (1936–2019)
- Charles Simic (1938–2023)
- Matija Bećković (born 1939)
- Ljubivoje Ršumović (born 1939)

==== Journalists ====
- Mihailo Polit-Desančić (1833–1920)
- Sava Bjelanović (1850–1897)
- Maga Magazinović (1882–1968), Serbia's 1st female journalist and women's rights activist
- Milorad Sokolović (born 1922), sports journalist
- Vasilije Stojković (1923–2008), sports journalist
- Zaharije Trnavčević (1926–2016)
- Ranko Munitić (1934–2009), film critic
- Gordana Suša (1946–2021), television journalist and columnist
- Milorad Vučelić (born 1948)
- Stojan Cerović (1949–2005), writer for the magazine Vreme
- Miroslav Lazanski (1950–2021), journalist, military analyst, politician, and diplomat
- Walt Bogdanich (born 1950), American investigative journalist and three-time recipient of the Pulitzer Prize.
- Milan Pantić (1954–2001)
- Saša Marković Mikrob (1959–2010)
- Ljiljana Aranđelović (born 1963), news paper editor
- Dejan Ristanović (born 1963)
- Dada Vujasinović (1964–1994), columnist
- Brankica Stanković (born 1975), investigative journalist
- Zoran Kesić (born 1976), TV presenter and talk-show host
- Vukša Veličković (born 1979), British cultural critic of Serbian descent
- Mirjana Bjelogrlić-Nikolov (born 1961), television journalist
- Jasmina Karanac (born 1967), television journalist
- Dubravka Lakić, film critic
- Jelena Adzic, Serbian-born Canadian CBC journalist and on-air personality
- Saša Petricic, Canadian award-winning CBC journalist
- Anka Radakovich, American magazine columnist

==== Editors and publishers ====
- Andrija Paltašić (1440–1500), early printer and publisher of Serb books.
- Bonino De Boninis (1454–1528), early printer and publisher in Dubrovnik.
- Božidar Vuković (1460–1530) and later his son, Vićenco Vuković, ran his father's print shop in Venice, from 1519 until 1561, with partners Stefan Marinović, Jerolim Zagurović, Jakov of Kamena Reka and others. The best known presses were established in 1519 in Goražde; at the Monastery of Rujno in the village of Bioska, near Užice; at Gračanica monastery in Kosovo; and at Mileševa monastery, near Prijepolje. In 1597 the Vuković press passed into the hands of Giorgio Rampazetto, who printed two important books—the Collection of Trvelers and the earliest Serbian primer.
- Hieromonk Makarije (1465 – c. 1530) is the founder of Serbian and Romanian printing, having printed the first book in the Serbian language in Obod (Crnagora) in 1493, and the first book in Wallachia. He also wrote extensively.
- Hieromonk Pahomije (c. 1480 – 1544) learned the skills of the printing trade from Hieromonk Makarije at the Crnojević printing house.
- Božidar Goraždanin founded the Goražde printing house in the 1520s.
- Luka Radovanović (15th century), was a 15th-century Serb Catholic priest from Ragusa who owned a small printing press, one of the earliest at the time.
- Đurađ Crnojević (fl. 1490–1496), first printed the Oktoih at Cetinje in 1495.
- Trojan Gundulić (c. 1500 – c. 1555), is remembered for printing the first book in Belgrade in 1552, "The Four Gospels".
- Hieromonk Mardarije (fl. 1550–1568) used to print his books at Mrkšina crkva printing house before the Ottomans destroyed it.
- Jerolim Zagurović (c. 1550 – 1580), was a Catholic-Serb printer from Kotor.
- Vićenco Vuković (fl. 1560–1571), was one of the major printers of 16th century Serbia, like his father before him.
- Stefan Marinović (fl. 1561–1563), was a Serb printer from Scutari during the time of Vićenco Vuković, Jerolim Zagurović, Jakov of Kamena Reka and others. The longest-lived printing in the Balkans was done at Scutari, where Stefan Skadranin worked between 1563 and 1580. When his press stopped, because of continued Turkish authority over the region, Serbian printing left the Balkans. Later, Serbian books were printed in Venice, Leipzig, Vienna, and Trieste.
- Mojsije Dečanac (fl. 1536–40) is remembered for printing Praznićni minej (Holiday Menaion) of Božidar Vuković in Venice in 1538.
- Hieromonk Genadije was another printer who worked alongside hieromonk Teodosije at Mileševa monastery and later in Venice with hierodeacon Mojsije and hieromonk Teodosije.
- Luka Primojević (16th century), is another early printer of the 16th century from Ragusa to use Church Slavonic, Cyrillic type.
- Stefan Vujanovski (1743–1829)
- Gligorije Vozarević (1790–1848)
- Vasa Pelagić (1833–1800), publisher, socialist
- Dimitrije Ruvarac (1842–1931)
- Vladislav F. Ribnikar (1871–1914)
- Darko F. Ribnikar (1878–1914)
- Stijepo Kobasica (1882–1944)
- Velibor Gligorić (1899–1977), literary critic, editor, and writer
- Danilo Gregorić (1900–1957), news paper editor
- Drenka Willen, Serbian-American award-winning editor, formerly with Harcourt Brace Jovanovich Inc.

==== Translators ====
- Okica Gluščević (1856–1898)
- Dimitrije Vladisavljević (1788–1858) is a grammarian, translator and writer.
Petar II Petrović-Njegoš is the national poet

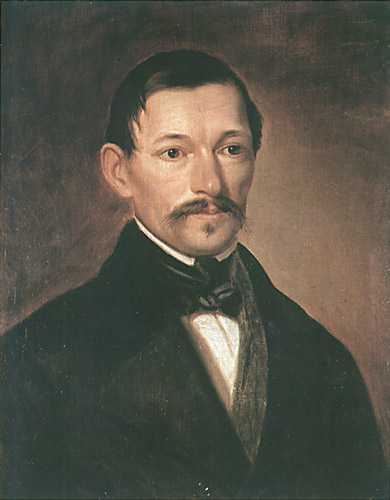
Jovan Sterija Popović is regarded as one of the best comic playwrights in Serbian literature.

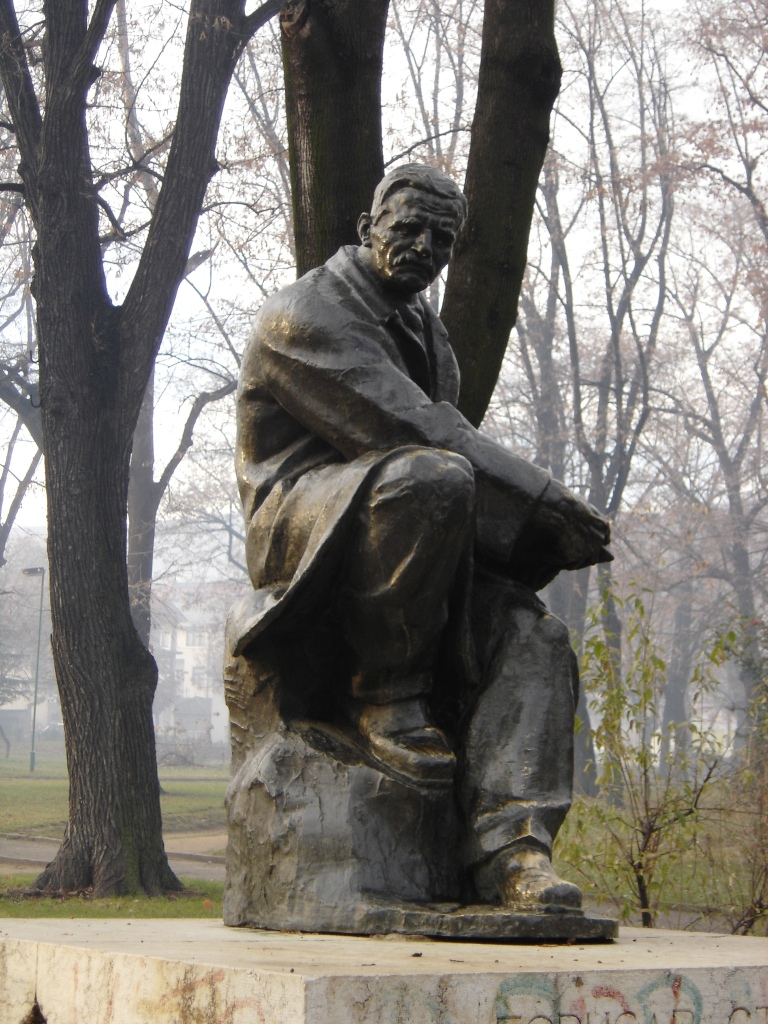
Realist Borisav Stanković wrote several works which have been described as masterpieces.

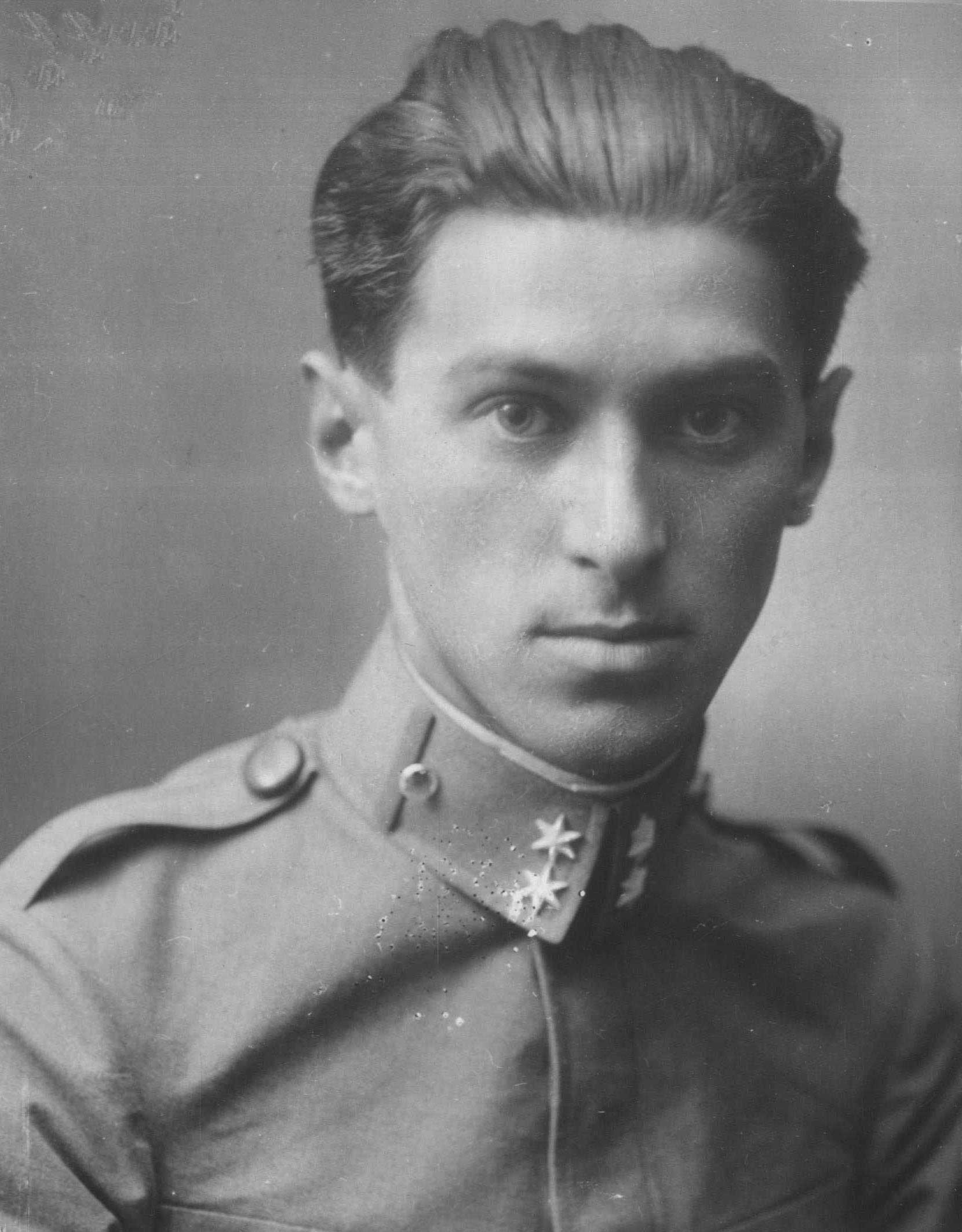
Miloš Crnjanski is a noted modernist writer and poet.

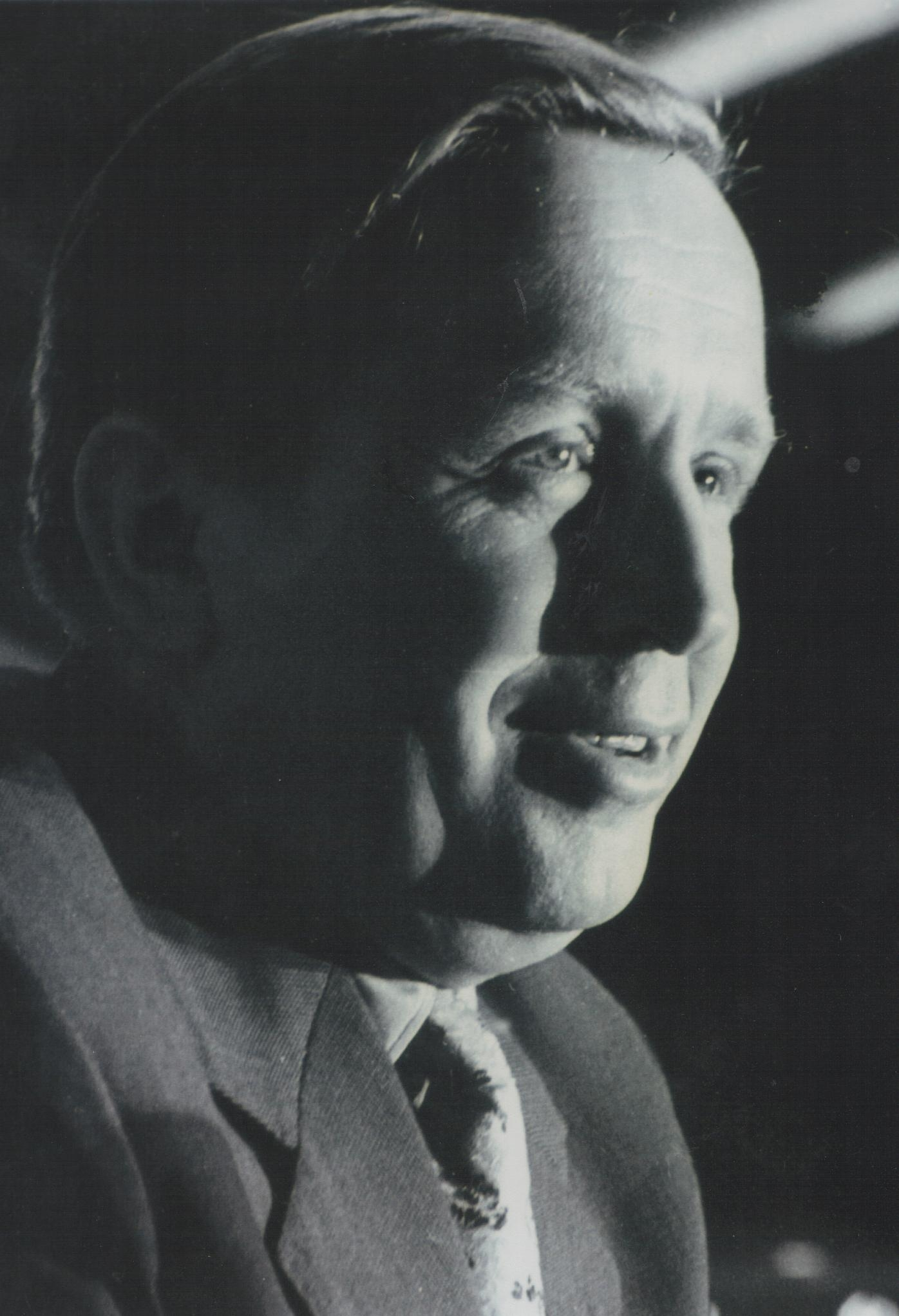
Branko Ćopić is today remembered as a favorite writer of children stories and novels about Yugoslav partisans

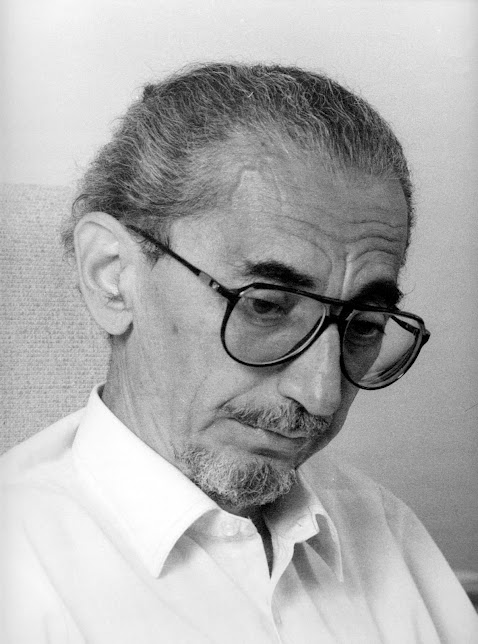
Borislav Pekić was a major writer and dramatist of the second half of the 20th century.

== Scholars and scientists ==
=== Scientists and inventors ===
- Lazar the Hilandarian (fl. 1404), Serbian Orthodox monk who built the first mechanical clock tower in Russia
- Ignác Martinovics (1790–1838), Hungarian scholar of Serb descent
- Dimitrije Frušić (1790–1838), prominent medical doctor and journalist based in Trieste
- Josif Pančić (1814–1888), botanist
- Dimitrije Nešić (1836–1904), mathematician
- Sava Petrović (1839–1889), botanist
- Ljubomir Klerić (1844–1910), mining engineer and mathematician
- Sima Lozanić (1847–1935), chemist
- Laza Lazarević (1851–1891), physician
- Ognjeslav Kostović Stepanović (1851–1916), created "arbonite" (i.e. plywood).
- Marko Leko (1853–1932), chemist
- Mihajlo Idvorski Pupin (1854–1935), physicist, professor and inventor of a new telecommunications technology
- Draga Ljočić (1855–1926), Serbia's first female doctor and women's rights activist
- Spiridon Gopčević (1855–1928), astronomer, also known by his nom de plume Leo Brenner, friend of American astronomer Percival Lowell
- Nikola Tesla (1856–1943), Serbian American inventor, and engineer known for his advancements in electrical power
- Jovan Žujović (1856–1938), pioneer in geological and paleontological science in Serbia
- Vuk Marinković (1807–1859), physicist
- Bogdan Gavrilović (1864–1947), mathematician
- Lujo Adamović (1864–1935), botanist
- Jovan Cvijić (1865–1927), geographer, ethnographer and geologist
- Vladimir Varićak (1865–1942), mathematician and theoretical physicist
- Mihailo Petrović Alas (1868–1943), author of the mathematical phenomenology and inventor of the first hydraulic computer capable to solve differential equations
- Mileva Marić (1875–1948), mathematician, wife of Albert Einstein
- Milutin Milanković (1879–1958), geophysicist, astronomer, writer, professor
- Pavle Vujević (1881–1966), founder of the science of microclimatology, and one of the first in the science of potamology
- Ivan Đaja (1884–1957), biologist and physiologist
- Jovan Hadži (1884–1972), Slovenian zoologist
- Jovan Čokor (1885–1946), epidemiologist
- Siniša Stanković (1892–1974), biologist
- Ilija Đuričić (1898–1965), veterinary physician
- Jovan Karamata (1902–1967), mathematician
- Danilo Blanusa (1903–1987), mathematician, of Serb heritage
- Tatomir Anđelić (1903–1993), mathematician
- Đuro Kurepa (1907–1993), mathematician
- Petar Đurković (1908–1981), astronomer
- Dragoslav Mitrinović (1908–1995), mathematician
- Petar Đurković (1908–1981), astronomer
- Pavle Savić (1909–1994), physicist and chemist, together with Irène Joliot-Curie he was nominated for Nobel Prize in Physics
- Milorad B. Protić (1911–2001), astronomer
- Rajko Tomović (1919–2001), physicist and inventor
- Dušan Kanazir (1921–2009), molecular biologist
- Obrad Vučurović (1921–2013), rocket scientist
- Nikola Hajdin (1923–2019), construction engineer
- Aleksandar Despić (1927–2005), physicist
- Bogdan Maglich (1928–2017), a nuclear physicist
- Mihajlo D. Mesarovic (born 1928), scientist and Club of Rome member
- Jovan Rašković (1929–1992), psychiatrist
- Svetozar Kurepa (1929–2010), mathematician
- Tihomir Novakov (1929–2015), physicist
- Petar Gburčik (1931–2006), scientist and a professor of meteorology at the University of Belgrade. He was the author of the first mathematical models of the numerical weather prediction, which were used operationally in the Weather Service of Yugoslavia from 1970 to 1977. In the same period, he began modelling of the atmospheric diffusion of air-pollution and created the first model of the spatial distribution of air-pollution
- Miomir Vukobratovic (1931–2012), mechanical engineer and pioneer in humanoid robots
- Ljubisav Rakic (born 1931–2022), neurobiologist
- Miodrag Radulovacki (1933–2014), neuropharmacologist and professor
- Milan Kurepa (1933–2000), physicist
- Petar V. Kokotovic (born 1934), engineering professor and theorist
- Milan Raspopović (born 1936), mathematician
- Milan Vukcevich (1937–2003), chemist and grandmaster of chess problem composition
- Miodrag Petković (born 1938), mathematician
- Gordana Vunjak-Novakovic (born 1948), biomedical engineer
- Gradimir Milovanović (born 1948), mathematician
- Zoran Knežević (born 1949), astronomer
- Bogdan Duricic (1950–2008), biochemist
- Zorica Pantić (born 1951), engineer and president of Wentworth Institute of Technology
- Marko V. Jaric (1952–1997), physicist
- Voja Antonić (born 1952), inventor, journalist, writer, magazine editor, radio show contributor, also creator of a build-it-yourself home computer Galaksija
- Milan Damnjanović (born 1953), physicist
- Jasmina Vujic (born 1953), nuclear engineering professor at Berkeley, 1st female nuclear engineering department chair in the US
- Stevo Todorčević (born 1955), mathematician
- Slobodan Antonić (born 1959), sociologist
- Milomir Kovac (born 1962), veterinary surgeon and professor
- Miodrag Stojković (born 1964), genetic scientist
- Ljubinka Nikolić (born 1964), geographer and geologist, future colonist chosen for the Mars One project (representing Serbia)
- Aleksandar Kavčić (born 1968), electrical engineer and university professor
- Maja Pantic (born 1970), A.I. expert and professor
- Jovo Bakić (born 1970), sociologist
- Vlatko Vedral (born 1971), physicist, known for his research on the theory of Entanglement and Quantum Information Theory
- Vladimir Markovic (born 1973), mathematician
- Vesna Milosevic-Zdjelar, Serbian born Canadian astrophysicist and science educator
- Jelena Kovacevic, Dean of Engineering at NYU's Tandon School and Carnegie Mellon University
- Gojko Lalic, chemistry professor at the University of Washington

=== Philosophers ===
- Dositej Obradović (1742–1811), author, philosopher, linguist, polyglot and the first minister of education of Serbia.
- Andrej Dudrovich (1783–1830), Russian national of Serb origin
- Petar II Petrović-Njegoš (1813–1851)
- Vladimir Jovanović (1833–1922)
- Svetozar Marković (1846–1875), sociologist
- Ljubomir Nedić (1858–1902), one of the most quoted philosophers in the late 19th century, a student of Wilhelm Wundt and professor at the University of Belgrade
- Branislav Petronijević (1875–1954), philosopher and paleontologist in the first half of the 20th century
- Veselin Čajkanović (1881–1946)
- Ion Petrovici (1882–1972), Romanian national of Serbian antecedents
- Dimitrije Mitrinović (1887–1953), philosopher, poet, revolutionary, mystic, theoretician of modern painting, traveller and cosmopolite.
- Justin Popović (1894–1979)
- Ksenija Atanasijević (1894–1981), philosopher and professor of Belgrade University
- Dimitrije Najdanović (1897–1986)
- Đuro Kurepa (1907–1992), logician
- Jevrem Jezdić (1916–1997)
- Mihailo Marković (1923–2010)
- Milan Damnjanović (1924–1994)
- Ljubomir Tadić (1925–2013)
- Mihailo Đurić (1925–2011)
- Gajo Petrović (1927–1993)
- Branko Pavlović (1928–1996)
- Nikola Milošević (1929–2007)
- Svetozar Stojanović (1931–2010)
- Thomas Nagel (born 1937)
- Divna M. Vuksanović (born 1965)
- Vojin Rakić (born 1967)
- Davor Džalto (born 1980)

=== Historians and archeologists ===
- Jovan Rajić (1726–1801)
- Jovan Gavrilović (1796–1877), historian, politician, statesman, and public figure. He was the first President of the Serbian Learned Society.
- Božidar Petranović (1809–1874), wrote the history of world literature in the 1840s
- Gavrilo Vitković (1829–1902)
- Jovan Ristić (1831–1899)
- Nićifor Dučić (1832–1900), theologian, historian and writer
- Ilarion Ruvarac (1832–1905)
- Stojan Bošković (1833–1908)
- Panta Srećković (1834–1903)
- Mihailo Valtrović (1839–2015), archeologist
- Stojan Novaković (1842–1915)
- Risto Kovačić (1845–1909)
- Ljubomir Kovačević (1848–1918)
- Vid Vuletic Vukasović (1853–1933)
- Spiridon Gopčević (1855–1928)
- Prince Bojidar Karageorgevitch (1862–1908)
- Mihailo Gavrilović (1868–1924)
- Tihomir Đorđević (1868–1944)
- Slobodan Jovanović (1869–1958)
- Miloje Vasić (1869–1956), archaeologist
- Stanoje Stanojević (1873–1937)
- Jovan Radonić (1873–1953)
- Vladimir Petković (1874–1956)
- Dragutin Anastasijević (1877–1950)
- Dragutin Anastasijević (1877–1950)
- Vladimir Ćorović (1885–1941)
- Milan Kašanin (1895–1981)
- Vaso Čubrilović (1897–1990)
- Miodrag Grbic (1901–1969), archaeologist
- Milos Mladenovic (1903–1984), professor emeritus at McGill in Montreal
- Djoko Slijepčević, (1907–1993), church historian
- Svetozar Radojčić (1909–1978)
- Wayne S. Vucinich (1913–2005)
- Vladimir Dedijer (1914–1990)
- Jevrem Jezdić (1916–1997)
- Traian Stoianovich (1921–2005)
- Milorad M. Drachkovitch (1921–1996)
- Dejan Medaković (1922–2008)
- Desanka Kovačević-Kojić (1925–2022)
- Branko Petranović (1927–1994)
- Milan Vasić (1928–2003)
- Milorad Ekmečić (1928–2015)
- Lazar Trifunović (1929–1983)
- Sima Ćirković (1929–2009)
- Božidar Ferjančić (1929–1998), historian and Byzantine scholar
- Vasilije Krestić (born 1932)
- Latinka Perović (1933–2022)
- Rade Mihaljčić (1937–2020)
- Momčilo Spremić (born 1937)
- Jovan I. Deretić (born 1939)
- Gordana Lazarevich (born 1939), Serbian born Canadian musicologist and university department head
- Predrag Dragić (1945–2012)
- Radivoj Radić (born 1954)
- Miroljub Jevtić (born 1955)
- Milan St. Protić (born 1957)
- Željko Fajfrić (born 1957)
- Dušan T. Bataković (1957–2017), historian and diplomat
- Anna Novakov (born 1959)
- Tibor Živković (1966–2013)
- Miloš Ković (born 1969)
- Lidija Seničar (born 1973)
- Čedomir Antić (born 1974)

=== Linguists and philogists ===
- Sava Mrkalj (1783–1833)
- Luka Milovanov Georgijević (1784–1828)
- Vuk Stefanović Karadžić (1787–1864), philologist and linguist who was the major reformer of the Serbian language
- Vukašin Radišić (1810–1843), the first Serbian classical philologists to teach poetics
- Đuro Daničić (1825–1882), collaborated with Vuk Karadžić in reforming and standardizing the Serbian language, and translating the Bible from old Serbo-Slavonic into modern-day Serbian
- Katarina Milovuk (1844–1909)
- Svetomir Nikolajevic (1844–1922), first professor at the Department of World Literature in Belgrade's School of Philosophy.
- Luko Zore (1846–1906)
- Milan Rešetar (1860–1942), linguist, Ragusologist, historian and literary critic
- Pavle Popović (1868–1939), literary critic and historian
- Nikola Vulić (1872–1945)
- Aleksandar Belić (1876–1960)
- Miloš Trivunac (1876–1944)
- Dragutin Anastasijević (1877–1950)
- Milan Budimir (1891–1975)
- Miloš N. Đurić (1892–1967), classical philologist, hellenist, classical translator and philosopher
- Emil Petrovici (1899–1968), Romanian linguist, who studied both Romanian and Slavic languages.
- Blaže Koneski (1921–1993), Macedonian linguist, writer and academic
- Mateja Matejić (priest) (1924–2018), Slavist
- Pavle Ivić (1924–1999) was a leading South Slavic dialectologist and phonologist
- Mateja Matejić (1924–2018)
- Predrag Palavestra (1930–2014)
- Ljiljana Crepajac (born 1931)
- Nikola Moravčević (born 1935), literary historian and literary critic
- Ivan Klajn (born 1937)
- Branko Mikasinovich (born 1938), Slavist
- Vladeta Janković (born 1940)
- Ljubiša Rajić (1947–2012)
- Darko Tanasković (born 1948)
- Aleksandar Loma (born 1955)
- Dejan Ajdačić (born 1959)
- Miodrag Kojadinović (born 1961)
- Milo Lompar (born 1962)
- Rajna Dragićević (born 1968)

=== Economists and sociologists ===
- Valtazar Bogišić (1834–1908), jurist and a pioneer in sociology.
- Lazar Paču (1855–1915)
- Milan Stojadinović (1888–1961), Minister of Finance, Prime Minister of Yugoslavia 1935–1939
- Dragoslav Avramović (1919–2001)
- Radovan Kovačević, Serbian-American professor at the Southern Methodist University Research Center for Advanced Manufacturing, holder of several U.S. patents.
- Sreten Sokić (born 1945)
- Miroljub Labus (born 1947), political economist
- Čedomir Čupić (born 1947)
- Branko Milanović (born 1953), leading economist in the World Bank's research department dealing with poverty and inequality, also a senior associate at the Carnegie Endowment for International Peace in Washington, D.C.
- Branislav Andjelić (born 1959)
- Jorgovanka Tabaković (born 1960)
- Kori Udovički (born 1961)
- Dejan Šoškić (born 1967)
- Radovan Jelašić (born 1968), Governor of the National Bank of Serbia 2004–2010
- Dušan Pavlović (professor) (born 1969)

=== Legal experts and lawyers ===
- Atanasije Dimitrijević Sekereš (1738–1794)
- Sava Tekelija (1761–1842), amongst the first Serbian doctor of law, president of the Matica srpska, philanthropist, noble, and merchant. Tekelija founded the Tekelijanum in Budapest in 1838 for Serb students studying in the city.
- Teodor Filipović (1778–1807), lawyer and professor who taught at the university of Harkov
- Konstantin Vojnović (1832–1903), politician, university professor and rector at University of Zagreb
- Nikodim Milaš (1845–1915), Serbian Orthodox bishop, polyglot, authority on church law and the Slavistics.
- Dragić Joksimović (1893–1951)
- Kosta Čavoški (born 1941), professor at the University of Belgrade's Law School and an outspoken critic of the International Criminal Tribunal for the former Yugoslavia.
- Sima Avramović (born 1950)
- Milan Antonijević (born 1975)
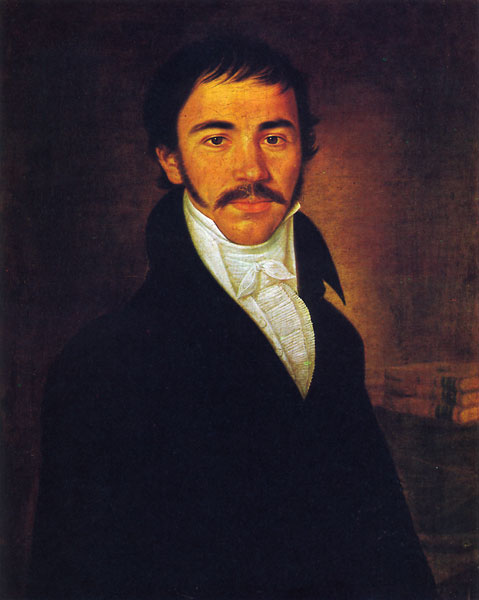
Vuk Karadžić reformed the Serbian language and gave many contributions to the Serbian culture.

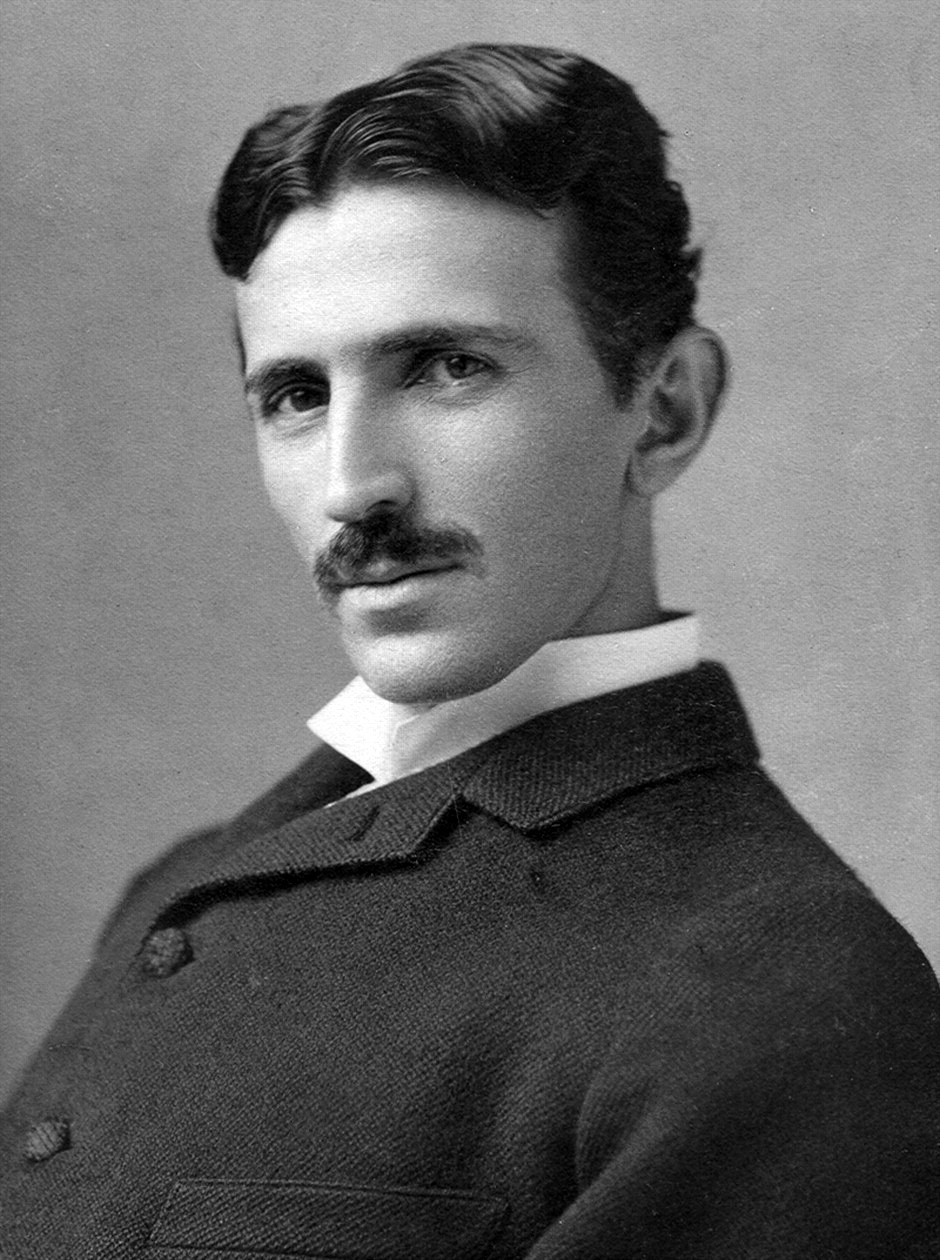
Nikola Tesla, inventor, electrical and mechanical engineer.

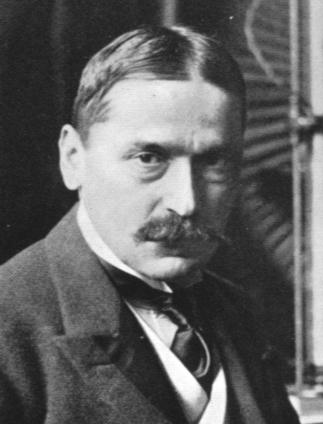
Mihajlo Pupin, physicist and physical chemist and a founding member of NACA which later became NASA.

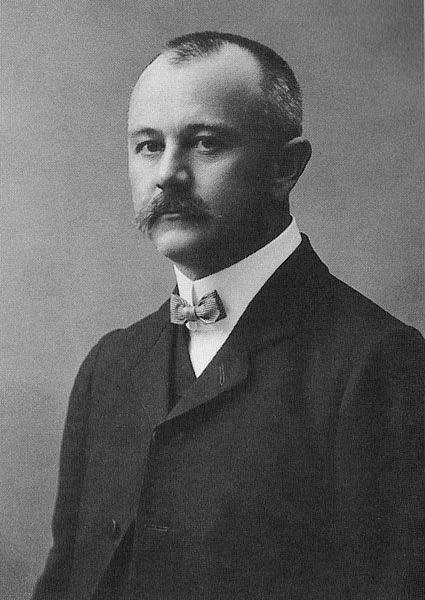
Jovan Cvijić, geographer, geologist, human geographer and ethnologist.

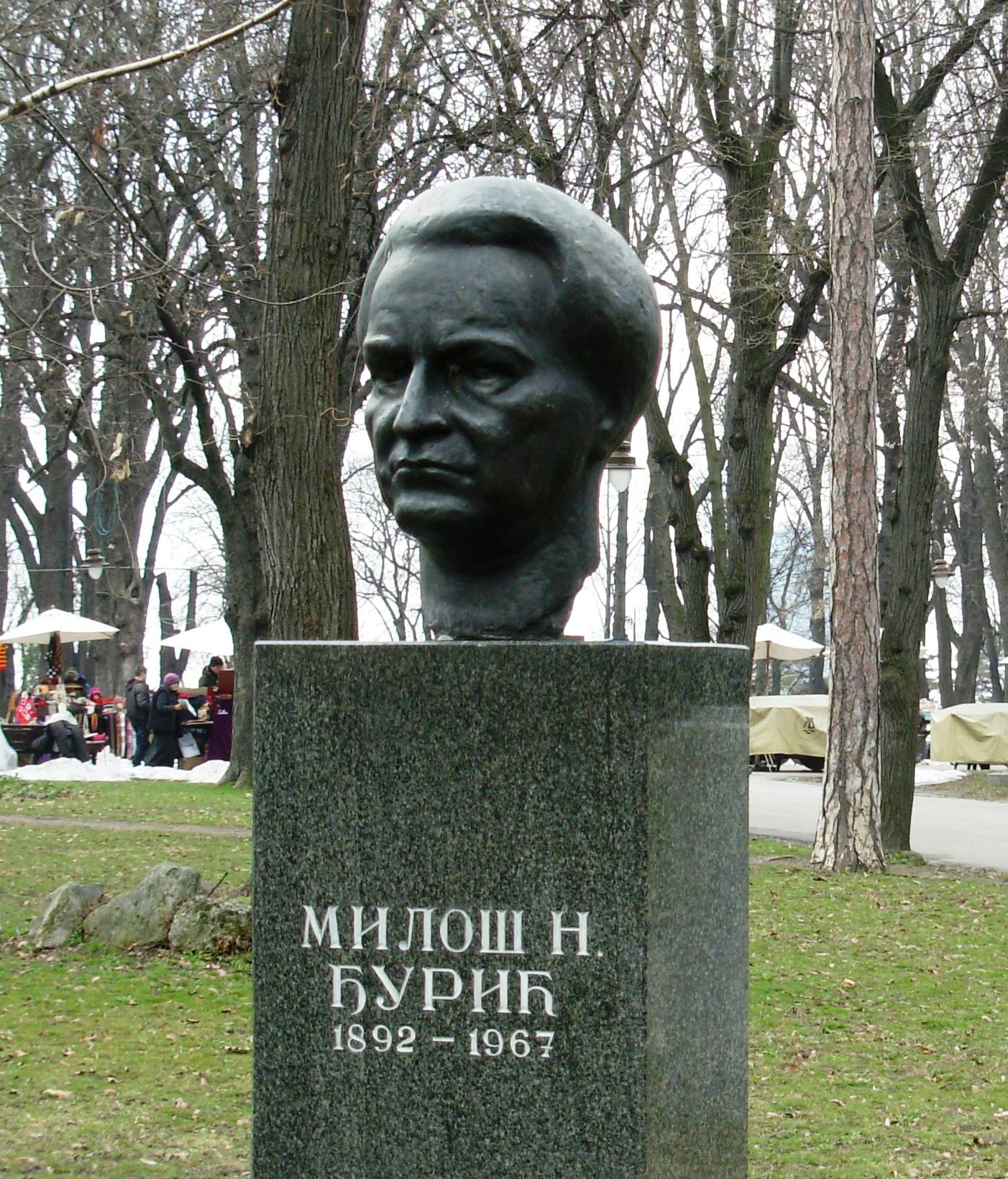
Miloš N. Đurić was a classical philologist, hellenist, classical translator, philosopher.

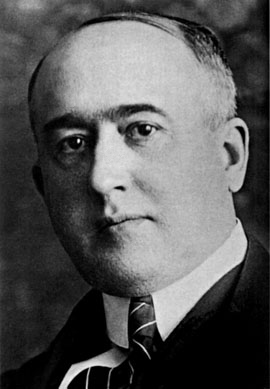
Milutin Milanković, mathematician, climatologist and geophysicist.

== Sportspeople ==
=== Athletics ===
- Dragutin Tomašević (1890–1915), Olympic track and field athlete
- Dragomir Tošić (1909–1985), football defender for Yugoslavia's National Team for the first World Cup, Member of the prominent Tošić family
- Ivan Gubijan (1923–2009), hammer thrower, Olympic medalist
- Mirjana Bilić (born 1936)
- Vera Nikolić (1948–2021), track and field athlete, double European Champion in 800m, former World record holder
- Nenad Stekić (1951–2021), long jumper
- Jovan Lazarević (born 1952), shot putter
- Vladimir Milić (born 1955), shot putter
- Miloš Srejović (born 1956), track and field athlete
- Dragan Zdravković (born 1959), Olympic middle-distance runner.
- Biljana Petrović (born 1961), Olympic high jumper
- Dragan Perić (born 1964), shot putter
- Miloš Srejović (born 1965), track and field athlete
- Slobodan Branković (born 1967), track and field athlete
- Snežana Pajkić (born 1970), middle-distance runner
- Dragutin Topić (born 1971), track and field athlete, World junior record holder in high jump with 2.37
- Olivera Jevtić (born 1977), Olympic long-distance runner
- Biljana Topić (born 1977), Olympic triple jumper
- Marija Šestak (born 1979), Olympic triple jumper
- Marina Munćan (born 1982), Olympic middle-distance runner
- Christina Vukicevic (born 1983), athletics, Eureopan U23 champion
- Mihail Dudaš (born 1989), decathlete and heptathlete
- Tatjana Jelača (born 1990), Olympic javelin thrower
- Ivana Španović (born 1990), track and field athlete, world champion

=== Basketball ===
- Press Maravich (1915–1987), American basketball coach
- John Abramovic (1919–2000), American player
- Nebojša Popović (1923–2001)
- Mike Todorovich (1923–2000), American player and coach
- Aleksandar Nikolić "Aca" (1924–2000), FIBA Hall of Fame, Euroleague Top 10 coaches; WC Coach 78', EC Coach 77', EC Cup 70', 72', 73'
- Borislav Stanković (1925–2020)
- Ranko Žeravica (1929–2015)
- Trajko Rajković (1937–1970)
- Radivoj Korać "Žućko" (1938–1969), FIBA Hall of Fame; top 50 in Europe, Euro MVP 61', Eponymous to FIBA Cup
- Vladimir Cvetković (born 1941), Olympic medalist
- Dušan Ivković "Duda" (born 1943), Euroleague Top 10 coaches; FIBA Coach 90', EC Coach 89', 91', 95'; EC Player 73'
- Peter Maravich (1947–1988), American
- Nikola Plećaš (born 1948)
- Dragan Kapičić (born 1948)
- Svetislav Pešić (born 1949)
- Zoran Slavnić (born 1949)
- Ljubodrag Simonović (born 1949)
- Gregg Popovich (born 1949), American basketball coach
- Zarko Zecevic (born 1950)
- Dražen Dalipagić "Praja" (born 1951), FIBA Hall of Fame; Mr. Europ
- Božidar Maljković "Boža" (born 1952), Euroleague Top 10 coaches, EL Coach
- Dragan Kićanović (born 1953), FIBA Hall of Fame; Mr. Europa
- Vukica Mitić (1953–2019), Olympic medalist
- Sofija Pekić (born 1953), Olympic medalist
- Rajko Toroman (born 1955), coach
- Ratko Radovanović (born 1956), Olympic medalist
- Zorica Đurković (born 1957), Olympic medalist
- Duško Vujošević (born 1959)
- Aleksandar Petrović (1959–2014)
- Biljana Majstorović (born 1959), Olympic medalist
- Jasmina Perazić (born 1960), Serbian-American Olympic medalist
- Željko Obradović (born 1960), 50 Greatest Euroleague Contributors
- Slađana Golić (born 1960), Olympic medalist
- Jelica Komnenović (born 1960), Olympic medalist
- Zoran Radović (born 1961)
- Zoran Sretenović (born 1964)
- Radisav Ćurčić (born 1965), Serbian-Israeli Israeli Basketball Premier League MVP
- Bojana Milošević (1965–2020), Olympic medalist
- Zoran Savić (born 1966)
- Branislav Prelević (born 1966)
- Aleksandar Đorđević (born 1967), Top 50 in Europe, Mr. Europa 94', 95', Euro MVP 97'
- Anđelija Arbutina (born 1967), Olympic medalist
- Vlade Divac (born 1968), FIBA Hall of Fame; Top 50 in Europe, Mr. Europa 89'; Kennedy Award 00'; NBA All-Star 01'
- Miloš Babić (born 1968)
- Radenko Dobraš (born 1968)
- Nenad Marković (born 1968)
- Milenko Topić (born 1969), Olympic medalist
- Predrag Danilović (born 1970), Top 50 in Europe, Mr. Europa and Italian League MVP 1998; EC 89', 91', 95', 97'
- Igor Kokoškov (born 1971)
- Željko Rebrača (born 1972)
- Dejan Koturović (born 1972)
- Nikola Lončar (born 1972), Olympic medalist
- Gordana Grubin (born 1972), WNBA player
- Dejan Bodiroga (born 1973) Top 10 in 2000s Europe
- Dejan Tomašević (born 1973)
- Dragan Tarlać (born 1973)
- Miroslav Berić (born 1973)
- Predrag Drobnjak (born 1975)
- Milan Gurović (born 1975)
- Dragan Lukovski (born 1975)
- Predrag Stojaković (born 1977)
- Dušan Kecman (born 1977)
- Dejan Milojević (born 1977)
- Igor Rakočević (born 1978)
- Marko Jarić (born 1978), (NBA) EuroBasket 2001, 1st 2002 FIBA World Championship
- Ratko Varda (born 1979)
- Petar Popović (born 1979)
- Ivanka Matić (born 1979)
- Vladimir Radmanović (born 1980)
- Miloš Vujanić (born 1980)
- Žarko Čabarkapa (born 1981)
- Marko Popović (born 1982)
- Milica Dabović (born 1982)
- Nenad Krstić (born 1983), All-Rookie NBA second team, EC Silver 09'
- Slavko Vraneš (born 1983)
- Sasha Pavlović (born 1983)
- Bojan Popović (born 1983)
- Velimir Radinović (born 1983), Canadian-Serbian
- Duško Savanović (born 1983)
- Ivana Matović (born 1983)
- Mile Ilić (born 1984)
- Aleksandar "Aleks" Marić (born 1984), Australian-Serbian
- Sasha Vujačić (born 1984)
- Kosta Perović (born 1985)
- Darko Miličić (born 1985), NBA champion 2004
- Nikola Peković (born 1986), NBA
- Goran Dragić (born 1986), NBA
- Novica Veličković (born 1986)
- Miloš Teodosić (born 1987)
- Nikola Dragovic (born 1987)
- Miljana Bojović (born 1987)
- Tamara Radočaj (born 1987)
- Nemanja Bjelica (born 1988)
- Boban Marjanović (born 1988)
- Sonja Vasić (born 1989), WNBA player
- Jelena Milovanović (born 1989)
- Ana Dabović (born 1989)
- Bogdan Bogdanović (born 1992)
- Vasilije Micić (born 1994), Serbian NBA and Israeli Basketball Premier League basketball player and 2021 Euroleague MVP
- Nikola Milutinov (born 1994)
- Nikola Jokić (born 1995), NBA All-star
- Aleksandar Zečević (born 1996), Serbian basketball player in the Israeli Basketball Premier League
- Deni Avdija (born 2001), Israeli basketball player for the Portland Trail Blazers of the National Basketball Association (NBA).

=== Boxing ===
- Zvonimir Vujin (1943–2019), Olympic medalist
- Svetomir Belić (born 1946), boxer
- Marijan Beneš (born 1951), Light Heavyweight, European Amateur Boxing Championship 1973 Gold, European Boxing Union 1979
- Sreten Mirković (1955–2016), European Amateur Boxing Championship 1979 Silver
- Tadija Kačar (born 1956), Light Heavyweight, Olympic Silver Montréal 1976
- Slobodan Kačar (born 1957), Light Heavyweight, Olympic Gold Moscow 1980
- Aleksandar Pejanović (1974–2011), Super Heavyweight, Bronze 2001 Mediterranean Games
- Neven Pajkić (born 1977), Bosnian Serb, Canadian Boxing Federation Champion
- Nenad Borovčanin (born 1978), European Cruiserweight boxing champion, undefeated with 30 wins and no losses
- Nikola Sjekloća (born 1978), Intercontinental 75 kg WBC
- Nenad Borovčanin (born 1979), boxer
- Geard Ajetović (born 1981), welterweight
- Marco Huck (born 1984), Serbian-born German, cruiserweight, world champion

=== Football ===
- Milutin Ivković (1906–1943)
- Blagoje Marjanović (1907–1984)
- Đorđe Vujadinović (1909–1990)
- Aleksandar Tirnanić (1910–1992)
- Ljubiša Broćić (1911–1995)
- Milovan Ćirić (1918–1986)
- Aleksandar Atanacković (born 1920), Olympic medalist
- Ljubomir Lovrić (1920–1994), Olympic medalist
- Branko Stanković (1921–2002)
- Prvoslav Mihajlović (1921–1978), Olympic medalist
- Rajko Mitić (1922–2008)
- Tihomir Ognjanov (1927–2006)
- Zdravko Rajkov ( 1927–2006), Olympic medalist
- Vladimir Beara (1928–2014)
- Borivoje Kostić (1930–2011)
- Miljan Miljanić (1930–2012)
- Todor Veselinović (1930–2017)
- Bora Kostić (1930–2011), Olympic medalist
- Vujadin Boškov (1931–2014)
- Dobrosav Krstić (1932–2015), Olympic medalist
- Miloš Milutinović (1933–2003)
- Blagoje Vidinić (1934–2006), Olympic medalist
- Petar Radenković (born 1934), Olympic medalist
- Vladica Popović (1935–2020), Olympic medalist
- Žarko Nikolić (1936–2011), Olympic medalist
- Vladimir Durković (1937–1972)
- Dragoslav Šekularac (1937–2019)
- Milutin Šoškić (1937–2022)
- Milan Galić (1938–2014)
- Velibor Vasović (1939–2002)
- Velimir Sombolac (1939–2016), Olympic medalist
- Vladica Kovačević (1940–2016), 1963–64 UEFA Champions League Top Scorer
- Ilija Pantelić (1942–2014)
- Ljubomir Mihajlović (born 1943)
- Ilija Petković (1945–2020)
- Dragan Džajić (born 1946)
- Doug Utjesenovic (born 1946), member of the Australian 1974 World Cup Squad
- Slobodan Santrač (1946–2016)
- Ljupko Petrović (born 1947), UEFA European Cup/Champions League winning manager
- Blagoje Paunović (1947–2014)
- Jovan Aćimović (born 1948)
- Dušan Bajević (born 1948)
- Radomir Antić (1948–2020)
- Dušan Bajević (born 1948)
- Dragoslav Stepanović (born 1948)
- Vladislav Bogićević (born 1950)
- Milovan Rajevac (born 1954)
- Vladimir Petrović (born 1955)
- Dušan Savić (born 1955)
- Steve Ogrizovic (born 1957), football
- Jovica Nikolić (born 1959), Olympic medalist
- Ivan Jovanović (born 1962)
- Borislav Cvetković (born 1962), Olympic medalist, 1986–87 UEFA Champions League Top Scorer
- Preki (born 1963), American player, named Major League Soccer MVP twice
- Miodrag Belodedici (born 1964)
- Stevan Stojanović (born 1964)
- Dragan Stojković (born 1965)
- Miroslav Đukić (born 1966)
- Milinko Pantić (born 1966), 1996–97 UEFA Champions League Top Scorer
- Saša Ćirić (born 1968)
- Slaviša Jokanović (born 1968)
- Vladimir Jugović (born 1969)
- Siniša Mihajlović (born 1969)
- Predrag Mijatović (born 1969)
- Zoran Mirković (born 1971)
- Bobby Despotovski (born 1971)
- Predrag Đorđević (born 1972)
- Darko Kovačević (born 1973)
- Savo Milošević (born 1973)
- Mladen Krstajić (born 1974)
- Ivica Dragutinović (born 1975)
- Ivan Đurđević (born 1977)
- Saša Ilić (born 1977)
- Veljko Paunović (born 1977)
- Milenko Ačimovič (born 1977), football
- Daniel Majstorović (born 1977), football
- Dejan Stanković (born 1978)
- Marko Nikolić (born 1979)
- Mateja Kežman (born 1979)
- Milivoje Novaković (born 1979), football
- Aleksandar Vuković (born 1979)
- Nikola Žigić (born 1980)
- Nemanja Vidić (born 1981), captain for Manchester United, has collection of honours including 3 consecutive Premier League titles (4 titles in total), the UEFA Champions League, the FIFA Club World Cup, three League Cup medals.
- Aleksandar Luković (born 1982)
- Zvjezdan Misimović (born 1982), football
- Branislav Ivanović (born 1984)
- Miloš Krasić (born 1984)
- Alex Smith (born 1984)
- Aleksandar Kolarov (born 1985)
- Duško Tošić (born 1985)
- Dejan Stankovic (born 1985), beach soccer
- Zdravko Kuzmanović (born 1987)
- Milorad Arsenijević (born 1987)
- Zdravko Kuzmanović (born 1987)
- Nemanja Matić (born 1988)
- Ljubomir Fejsa (born 1988)
- Neven Subotić (born 1988)
- Marko Marin (born 1989), football
- Marko Arnautović (born 1989), football
- Bojan Krkić (born 1990)
- Aleksandar Katai (born 1991)
- Danijel Aleksić (born 1991), footballer, UEFA European Under-17 Championship Golden Player Award
- Filip Mladenović (born 1991)
- Uroš Spajić (born 1993)
- Jovana Damnjanović (born 1994)
- Jelena Čanković (born 1995)
- Sergej Milinković-Savić (born 1995)
- Uroš Račić (born 1998)
- Dušan Vlahović (born 2000)

=== Handball ===
- Petar Fajfrić (born 1942), Olympic medalist
- Slobodan Mišković (1944–1997) Olympic medalist
- Zoran Živković (born 1945), Olympic medalist
- Đorđe Lavrnić (1946–2010), Olympic medalist
- Milorad Karalić (born 1946), Olympic medalist
- Branislav Pokrajac (1947–2018) Olympic medalist
- Nebojša Popović (born 1947), Olympic medalist
- Zdravko Rađenović (born 1952), Olympic medalist
- Momir Rnić (born 1955), Olympic medalist
- Zlatan Arnautović (born 1956), Olympic medalist
- Jovica Elezović (born 1956), Olympic medalist
- Milan Kalina (born 1956), Olympic medalist
- Dragan Mladenović (born 1956), Olympic medalist
- Veselin Vuković (born 1958), Olympic medalist
- Mile Isaković (born 1958), Olympic champion
- Svetlana Dašić-Kitić (born 1960), voted the best of all time
- Svetlana Anastasovska (born 1961), Olympic medalist
- Mirjana Đurica (born 1961), Olympic medalist
- Slobodan Kuzmanovski (born 1962), Olympic medalist
- Zlatko Portner (1962–2020) Olympic medalist
- Dragan Škrbić (born 1968), IHF World Player of the Year 2000
- Nedeljko Jovanović (born 1970)
- Vladan Matić (born 1970)
- Nenad Maksić (born 1972)
- Bojana Radulović (born 1973)
- Ljubomir Vranjes (born 1973)
- Tatjana Medved (born 1974)
- Ratko Nikolić (born 1977)
- Darko Stanić (born 1978)
- Dalibor Doder (born 1979), Olympic medalist
- Katarina Bulatović (born 1979), Olympic medalist
- Ana Đokić (born 1979), Olympic medalist
- Bojana Popović (born 1979), Olympic medalist
- Momir Ilić (born 1981)
- Ivan Nikčević (born 1981)
- Rastko Stojković (born 1981)
- Svetlana Ognjenović (born 1981)
- Marko Vujin (born 1984)
- Katarina Tomašević (born 1984)
- Maja Ognjenović (born 1984), volleyball player, Olympic medalist
- Nikola Karabatić (born 1984), French handball player (Serbian mother)
- Rajko Prodanović (born 1986)
- Dragan Travica (born 1986), volleyball, Olympic medalist
- Petar Nenadić (born 1986)
- Andrea Lekić (born 1987)
- Sanja Damnjanović (born 1987)
- Dragana Cvijić (born 1990)

=== Swimming ===
- Nenad Miloš (born 1955), swimmer
- Predrag Miloš (born 1955), swimmer
- Miloš Milošević (born 1972), swimmer
- Vladan Marković (born 1977), swimmer
- Milorad Čavić (born 1984), Olympic medalist in swimming
- Nađa Higl (born 1987), swimmer
- Sara Isaković (born 1988), Olympic medalist in swimming
- Miroslava Najdanovski (born 1988), swimmer
- Luka Stevanović (born 1991), swimmer
- Velimir Stjepanović (born 1993), swimmer

=== Table tennis ===
- Zlatko Kesler (born 1960), Paralympic medalist in table tennis
- Gordana Perkučin (born 1962), Olympic medalist, table tennis player
- Ilija Lupulesku (born 1967), Olympic medalist in table tennis
- Jasna Fazlić (born 1970), Olympic medalist, table tennis player
- Borislava Perić (born 1972), table tennis professional
- Aleksandar Karakašević (born 1975), table tennis professional
- Aleksandar Karakašević (born 1975), table tennis player
- Biljana Golić (born 1977), table tennis professional
- Nada Matić (born 1984), table tennis professional

=== Tennis ===
- Jelena Genčić (1936–2013)
- Slobodan Živojinović (born 1963)
- Daniel Nestor (born 1972), Canadian, born in Belgrade
- Nenad Zimonjić (born 1976)
- Dušan Vemic (born 1976)
- Dejan Petrovic (born 1978)
- Jelena Dokić (born 1983), Australian former world No. 4 (19 August 2002), six WTA
- Frank Dancevic (born 1984), plays for Canada
- Janko Tipsarević (born 1984)
- Jelena Janković (born 1985)
- Viktor Troicki (born 1986)
- Novak Djokovic (born 1987)
- Ana Ivanovic (born 1987)
- Igor Sijsling (born 1987), Dutch tennis player
- Andrea Petković (born 1987), Bosnian Serb, German national, two WTA
- Vesna Dolonc (born 1989)
- Nikola Čačić (born 1990)
- Miloš Raonić (born 1990), Montenegrin Serb and plays for Canada
- Bojana Jovanovski (born 1991)
- Kristina Mladenović (born 1993), French of Serbian parentage
- Olga Danilović (born 2001)

=== Volleyball ===
- Ljubomir Travica (born 1954)
- Zoran Gajić (born 1958)
- Slobodan Kovač (born 1967), Olympic medalist
- Vladimir Batez (born 1969), Olympic medalist
- Vladimir Grbić (born 1970), Olympic champion in volleyball, Volleyball Hall of Fame)
- Rajko Jokanović (born 1971), Olympic medalist
- Đorđe Đurić (born 1971), Olympic medalist
- Đula Mešter (born 1972), Olympic medalist
- Nikola Grbić (born 1973), Olympic champion in volleyball and coach
- Vasa Mijić (born 1973), Olympic medalist
- Slobodan Boškan (born 1975), Olympic medalist
- Andrija Gerić (born 1977), Olympic champion in volleyball
- Vesna Čitaković (born 1979)
- Ivan Miljković (born 1979), one of the most decorated volleyball players in the world
- Goran Marić (born 1981)
- Bojan Janić (born 1982)
- Jelena Nikolić (born 1982)
- Vlado Petković (born 1983)
- Anja Spasojević (born 1983)
- Ivana Đerisilo (born 1983)
- Nikola Kovačević (born 1983)
- Nikola Rosić (born 1984)
- Suzana Ćebić (born 1984)
- Dragan Stanković (born 1985)
- Brižitka Molnar (born 1985)
- Nataša Krsmanović (born 1985)
- Miloš Nikić (born 1986)
- Marko Podraščanin (born 1987)
- Ana Antonijević (born 1987)
- Jovana Brakočević (born 1988), volleyball player
- Saša Starović (born 1988)
- Milena Rašić (born 1990)
- Mihajlo Mitić (born 1990)
- Sanja Malagurski (born 1990)
- Stefana Veljković (born 1990)
- Aleksandar Atanasijević (born 1991)
- Tijana Bošković (born 1997)
- Tijana Malešević (born 1991)
- Srećko Lisinac (born 1992)
- Uroš Kovačević (born 1993)

=== Water polo ===
- Mirko Sandić (1942–2006), member of FINA Hall of Fame
- Nenad Manojlović (1954–2014)
- Dragan Andrić (born 1962), 2x Olympic medalist
- Ljubiša Simić (born 1963), boxer
- Igor Milanović (born 1965)
- Goran Rađenović (born 1966), Olympic medalist
- Viktor Jelenić (born 1970), Olympic medalist
- Dejan Udovičić (born 1970)
- Dušan Popović (1970–2011)
- Petar Trbojević (born 1973), Olympic medalist
- Vladimir Vujasinović (born 1973)
- Nikola Kuljača (born 1974), Olympic medalist
- Dejan Savić (born 1975), waterpolo trainer
- Danilo Ikodinović (born 1976)
- Aleksandar Ćirić (born 1977), Olympic medalist
- Slobodan Soro (born 1978), 2x Olympic medalist
- Branko Peković (born 1979), Olympic medalist
- Vanja Udovičić (born 1982)
- Živko Gocić (born 1982)
- Gojko Pijetlović (born 1983), Olympic medalist
- Slobodan Nikić (born 1983), Olympic medalist
- Duško Pijetlović (born 1985), 2x Olympic medalist
- Nikola Rađen (born 1985), 2x Olympic medalist
- Branislav Mitrović (born 1985)
- Milan Aleksić (born 1986), Olympic medalist
- Marko Avramović (born 1986)
- Filip Filipović (born 1987), waterpolo player
- Andrija Prlainović (born 1987)
- Aleksandar Šapić (born 1978), Serbian politician and a retired water polo player, multiple Olympic medalist
- Stefan Mitrović (born 1988), Olympic medalist
- Miloš Ćuk (born 1990)
- Aleksa Šaponjić (born 1992), Olympic medalist
- Dušan Mandić (born 1994), Olympic medalist

=== Other ===
- Giovanni Raicevich (1881–1957), Greco-Roman wrestler (European Champion, 1909)
- Albert Bogen (born Albert Bógathy; 1882–1961), Olympic fencer
- Boris Kostić (1887–1963), chess player
- Johnny Miljus (1895–1976), MLB player
- James Trifunov (1903–1993), Serbian-Canadian Olympic medalist in wrestling
- Steve Swetonic (1903–1974), MLB Player
- Ozren Nedeljković (1903–1984), chess player
- Vasilije Tomović (1906–1994), chess player
- Mike Kreevich (1908–1994), MLB player, notable center fielder during the 1930s and 1940s
- Petar Trifunović (1910–1980), chess player
- Steve Sundra (1910–1952), 1939 World Series Champion
- Al Niemiec (1911–1995), player for the Boston Red Sox, Philadelphia Athletics, and Seattle Rainiers
- George Kakasic (1912–1973), chess player
- Emil Verban (1915–1989), MLB player
- Nick Strincevich (1915–2011), MLB player
- Pete Suder (1916–2006), MLB player
- Wally Judnich (1916–1971), MLB player
- Jess Dobernic (1917–1998), MLB player
- Bill Vukovich (1918–1955), Serbian American automobile racing driver
- Babe Martin (1920–2013), MLB player
- Svetozar Gligorić (1923–2012), chess player
- Dragoljub Janošević (1923–1993), chess player
- Walt Dropo (1923–2010), MLB player
- Joe Tepsic (1923–2009), MLB Player
- Dragoljub Velimirović (1942–2014), chess player
- Borislav Milić (1925–1986), chess player
- Bronko Lubich (1925–2007), wrestler, referee and trainer
- Rocky Krsnich (1927–2019), MLB player
- Borivoje Vukov (1929–2010), wrestler, World champion
- Aleksandar Matanović (born 1930), chess player
- Mike Krsnich (1931–2011), MLB player
- Milunka Lazarević (1932–2018), chess player
- Borislav Ivkov (born 1933), chess player
- Eli Grba (1934–2019), American League Champion with the New York Yankees
- Branislav Simic (born 1935), Olympic champion in wrestling
- Milan Matulović (1935–2013), chess player
- Dimitrije Bjelica (born 1935), chess player
- Dragoljub Ciric (1935–2014), chess player
- Branislav Simić (born 1935), wrestler, Olympic medalist
- Milan Vukčević (1937–2003), chess player
- Branislav Martinović (1937–2015), Olympic medalist in wrestling
- Predrag Ostojić (1938–1996), chess player
- Alex Andjelic (1940–2021), coach
- Paul Popovich (born 1940), MLB player
- Mickey Lolich (born 1940), MLB Player
- Milan Vukić (born 1942), chess player
- Bill Vukovich II (born 1944), auto racing driver
- Mike Kekich (born 1945), MLB player
- Ljubomir Vračarević (1947–2013), Serbian martial artist and founder of Real Aikido
- John Vukovich (1947–2007), MLB player and coach
- Slavko Obadov (1948–2025), Olympic medalist in judo
- Doc Medich (born 1948), MLB player
- Slavko Obadov (born 1948), Olympic medalist
- Ivan Boldirev (born 1949)
- Ljubomir Ljubojević (born 1950), chess player
- Boško Abramović (born 1951), chess player
- Dave Rajsich (born 1951), MLB player
- Peter Vuckovich (born 1952), AL Cy Young winner
- Zoran Pančić (born 1953), Olympic medalist in rowing
- Milorad Stanulov (born 1953), Olympic medalist in rowing
- Momir Petkovic (born 1953), Olympic champion in wrestling
- Milorad Stanulov (born 1953), rowing, Olympic medalist
- Radomir Kovačević (1954–2006), Olympic medalist in judo
- Gary Rajsich (born 1954), MLB player
- Radomir Kovačević (1954–2006), Olympic medalist
- George Vukovich (born 1956), MLB player
- Mirko Puzović (born 1956), Olympic medalist
- Milan Janić (born 1957), sprint canoeist, World champion
- Dan Radakovich (born 1958), sports administrator
- Petar Popović (born 1959), chess player
- Predrag Nikolić (born 1960), chess player
- Mirko Nišović (born 1961), Olympic champion in canoeing
- Branko Damljanović (born 1961), chess player
- Mirko Nišović (born 1961), sprint canoeist
- Goran Maksimović (born 1963), Olympic champion in sports shooting
- Jasna Šekarić (born 1965), multiple Olympic medalist in sports shooting
- Peter Zezel (1965–2009) ice hockey, Canada Soccer Hall of Fame
- Zoran Zorkic (born 1966), golf coach in Texas
- Dejan Antić (born 1968), chess player
- Peter Popovic (born 1968), ice hockey
- Alisa Marić (born 1970), chess player
- Mirjana Marić (born 1970), chess player
- Adrien Plavsic (born 1970), ice hockey, Olympic medalist
- Nemanja Mirosavljev (born 1970), World championship bronze medalist
- Ryan Radmanovich (born 1971), MLB Player and member of Canada Olympic baseball team
- Sasha Lakovic (1971–2017), ice hockey
- Željko Dimitrijević (born 1971), Paralympic medalist in athletics
- Stevan Pletikosić (born 1972), sports shooter, Olympic medalist
- Ognjen Filipović (born 1973), sprint canoeist, World champion
- Slobodan Grujić (born 1973)
- Paola Vukojicic (born 1974), field hockey player
- Aleksandra Ivošev (born 1974), Olympic champion in sports shooting
- Igor Miladinović (born 1974), chess player
- Nikola Stojić (born 1974), rowing
- Ivan Prokić (born 1975)
- Trifun Živanović (born 1975), Serbian-American figure skater
- Mara Kovačević (born 1975)
- Đorđe Višacki (born 1975), rowing
- Lavinia Milosovici (born 1976), Romanian gymnast of Serbian origin, multiple Olympic champion
- Nenad Babović (born 1976), rowing
- Pavle Jovanovic (1977–2020), Serbian-American bobsledder
- Ivan Ivanišević (born 1977), chess player
- Erik Bakich (born 1977), college baseball coach
- Rhonda Rajsich (born 1978), American racquetball player of Serbian origin
- Bora Sibinkić (born 1978), sprint canoer, World champion
- Snežana Pantić (born 1978)
- Miloš Mijalković (born 1978)
- Andrija Zlatić (born 1978), Olympic medalist
- Dragan Zorić (born 1979), sprint canoeist, World champion
- Milan Đenadić (born 1979), sprint canoeist, World champion
- Miloš Grlica (born 1979), Paralympic medalist in athletics
- Draženko Mitrović (born 1979), Double paralympic medalist in athletics
- Dragan Šolak (born 1980), chess player
- Bojan Vučković (born 1980), chess player
- Ivan Stević (born 1980), road bicycle racer
- Branko Radivojevič (born 1980), ice hockey
- Miloš Tomić (born 1980), rowing
- Jelena Lolović (born 1981)
- Vanja Babić (born 1981)
- Nataša Dušev-Janić (born 1982), Olympic champion in canoeing
- Goran Nedeljković (born 1982), rowing
- Miloš Pavlović (born 1982), auto racing driver
- Nenad Gajic (born 1983), lacrosse player
- Nick Zoricic (1983–2012), Canadian skier
- Nebojša Jovanović (born 1983), road bicycle racer
- Boris Čizmar (born 1984), futsal player
- Ljilja Drljević (born 1984), chess player
- Dragan Umicevic (born 1984)
- Brian Bogusevic (born 1984), MLB player
- Damir Mikec (born 1984)
- Dušan Borković (born 1984), auto racing driver
- Duško Stanojević (born 1984)
- Iva Obradović (born 1984)
- Goran Jagar (born 1984)
- Marko Marjanović (born 1985)
- Jeff Samardzija (born 1985), MLB player
- Antonija Nađ (born 1986), sprint canoer
- Radomir Petković (born 1986)
- Zorana Arunović (born 1986), sports shooter, World Champion
- Andrea Arsović (born 1987), sports shooter
- Nenad Pagonis (born 1987), kickboxing champion
- Borki Predojević (born 1987), chess player
- Jovan Popović (born 1987), rowing
- Milan Lucic (born 1988), Canadian
- Milanko Petrović (born 1988), biathlete
- Aleksandar Maksimović (born 1988)
- Dejan Pajić (born 1989), sprint canoer
- Marko Novaković (born 1989), sprint canoer, World champion
- Nevena Ignjatović (born 1990)
- Ognjen Stojanović (born 1990), triathlon
- Bobana Veličković (1990–2020) 2 times European Champion
- Ivana Maksimović (born 1990), Olympic medalist
- Milica Mandić (born 1991), Olympic champion in taekwondo
- Christian Yelich (born 1991), MLB player
- Đorđe Nešković (born 1991), curler
- Tanja Dragić (born 1991), Paralympic medalist in athletics
- Aleksandar Rakić (born 1992), mixed martial artist
- Darko Stošić (born 1992), mixed martial artist
- Jovana Crnogorac (born 1992), cross-country mountain biker.
- Alex Petrovic (born 1992), ice hockey
- Nikola Jakšić (born 1997), waterpolo player
- Staša Gejo (born 1997), sport climber
- Tijana Bogdanović (born 1998), Taekwondo practitioner
- Miljana Knežević, sprint canoer
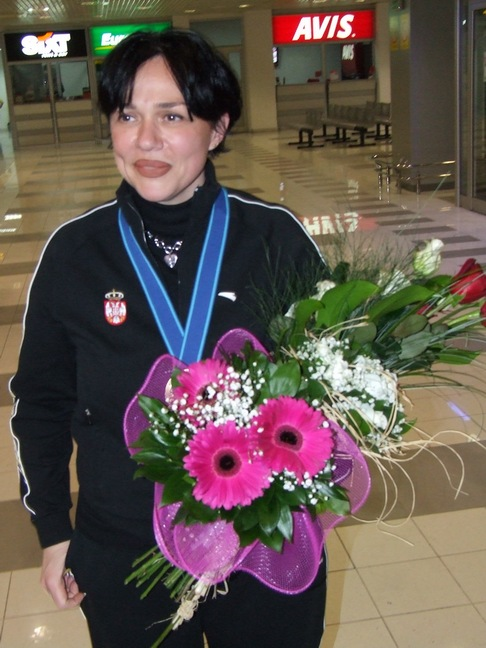
Jasna Šekarić is a World, Olympic and European champion in sport shooting.

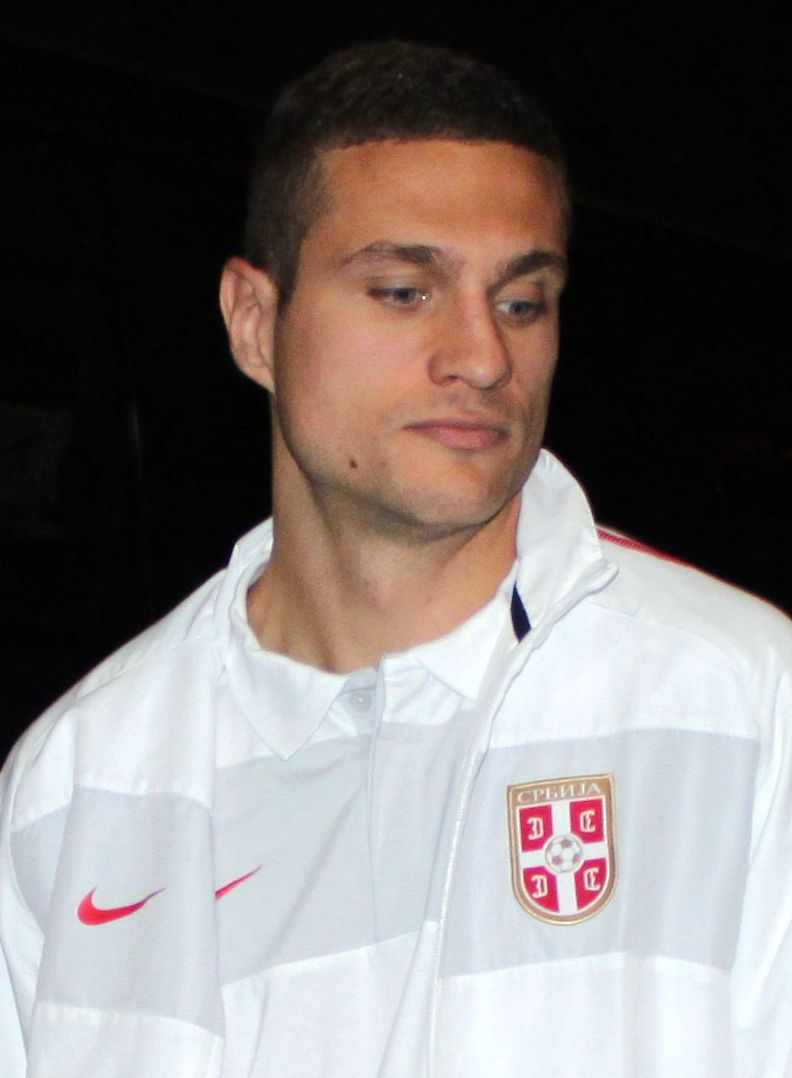
Nemanja Vidić was twice named in the FIFA FIFPro World XI and as the Premier League Player of the Season.

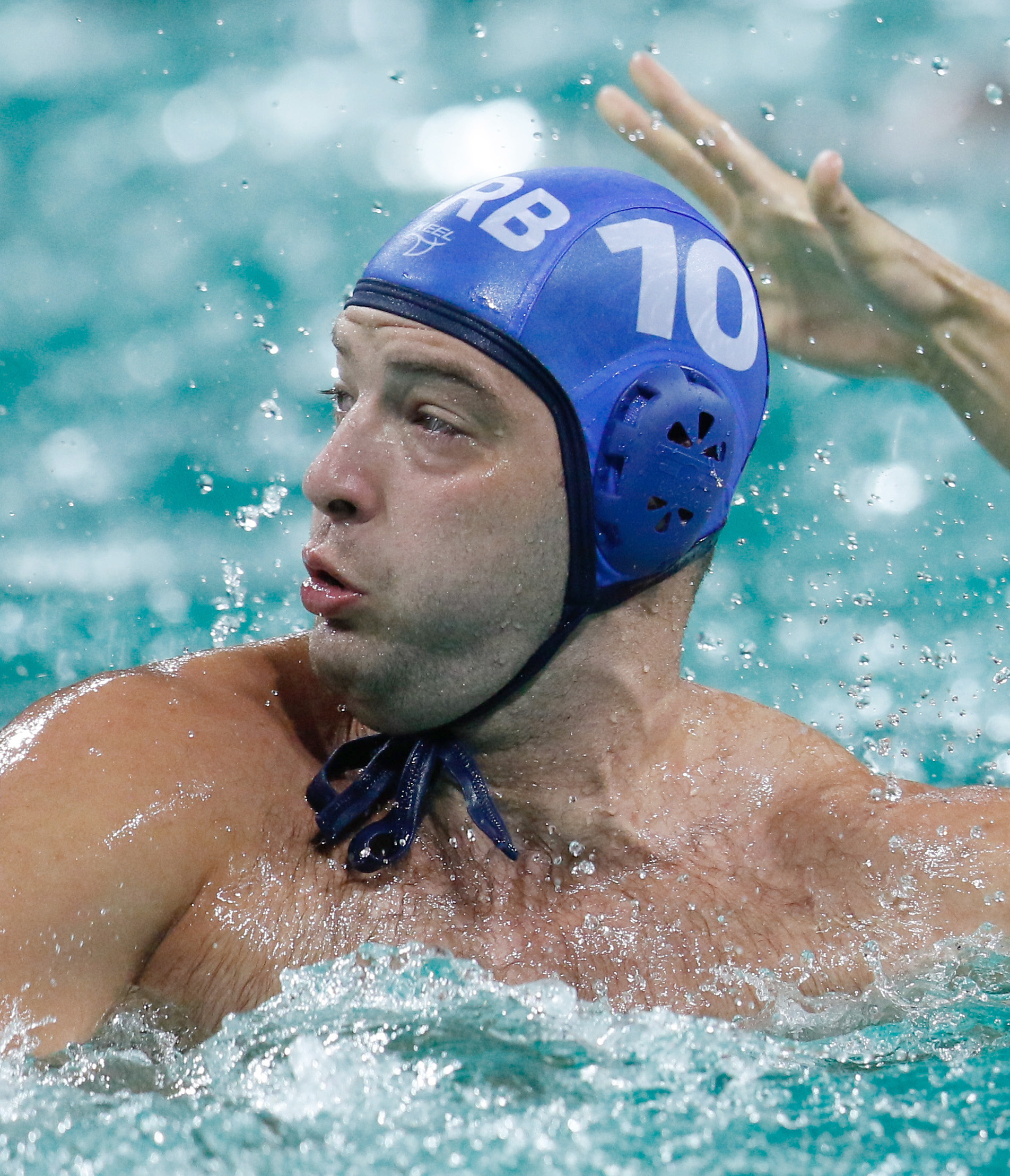
Filip Filipović won every major award in water polo.

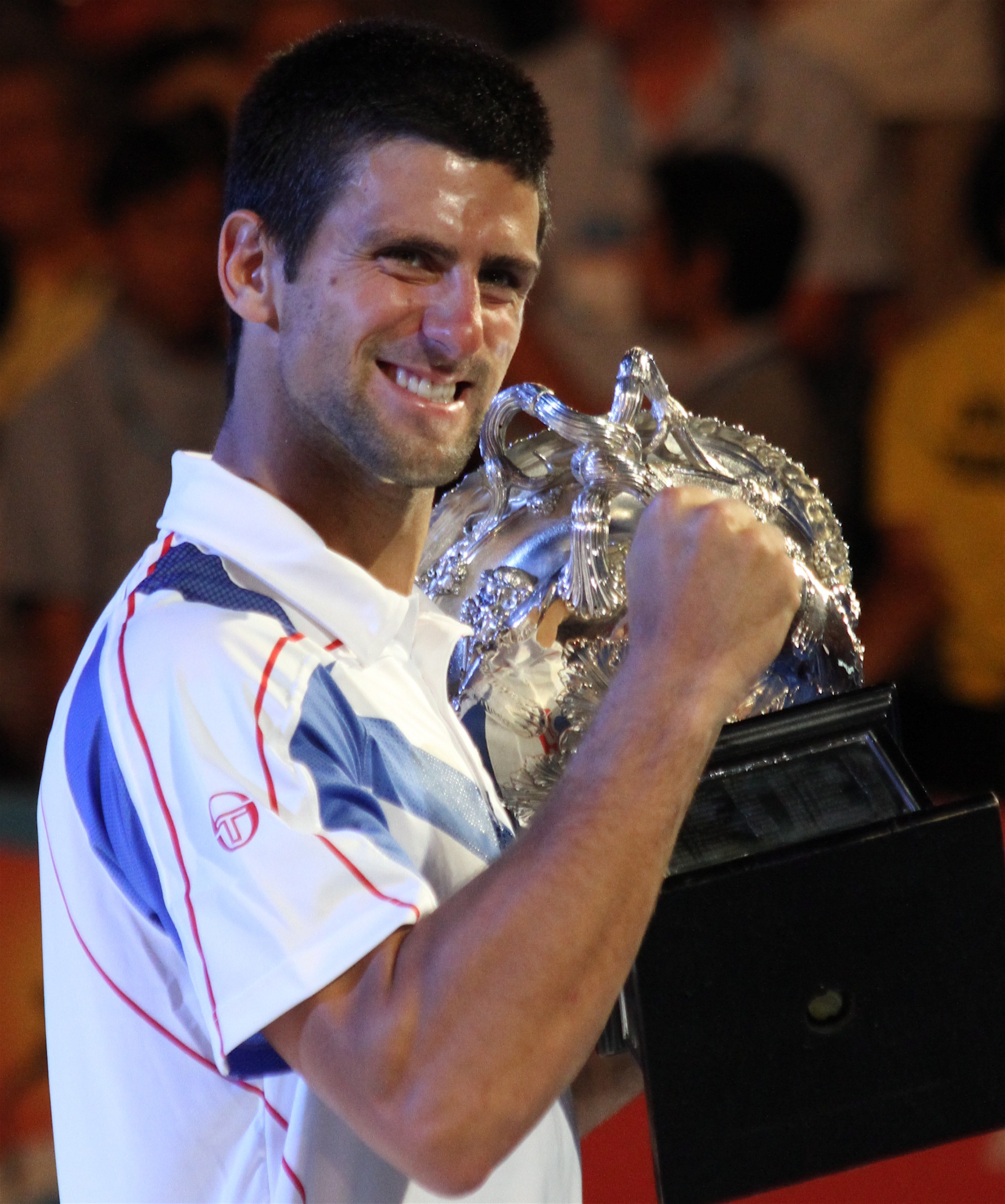
Novak Djokovic is the best tennis player of all time.

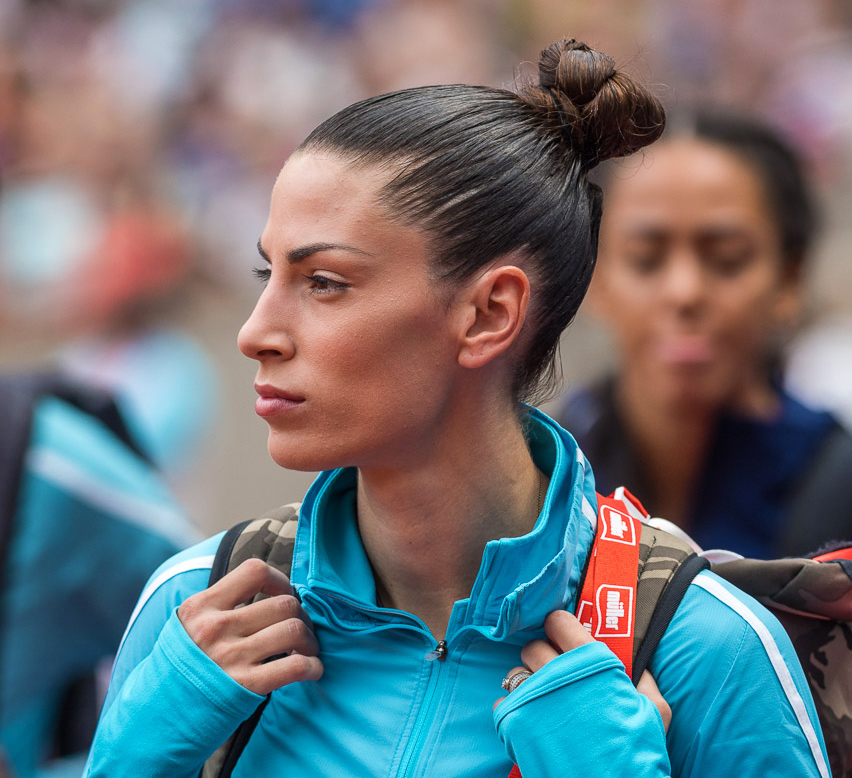
Ivana Španović holds the national and World record in long jump.

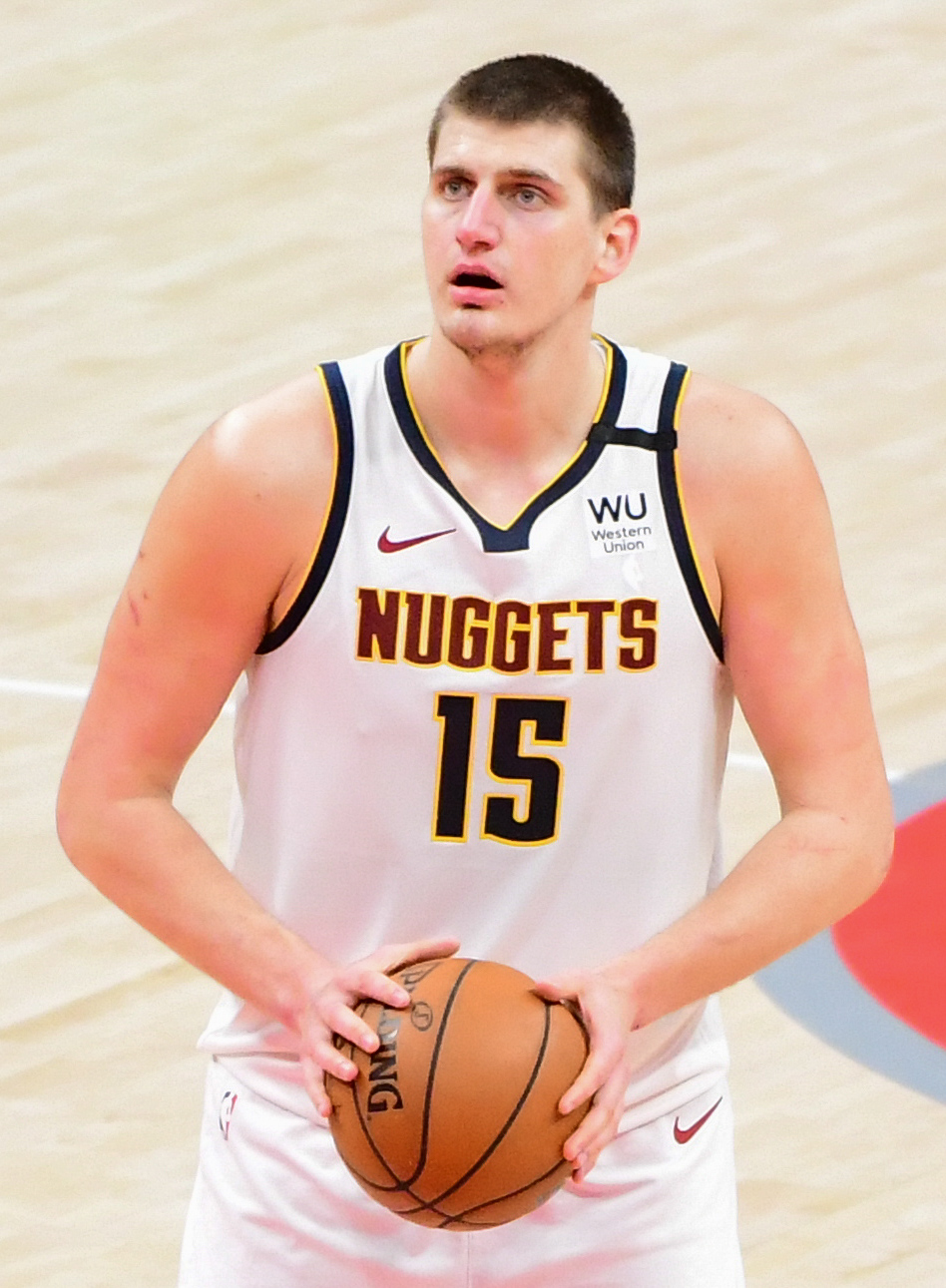
Nikola Jokić is 2 x NBA Most Valuable Player Award winner, 2023 NBA champion, NBA Finals MVP (2023), Olympic silver medalist, five-time NBA All-Star.

== Royalty ==
=== Princesses ===
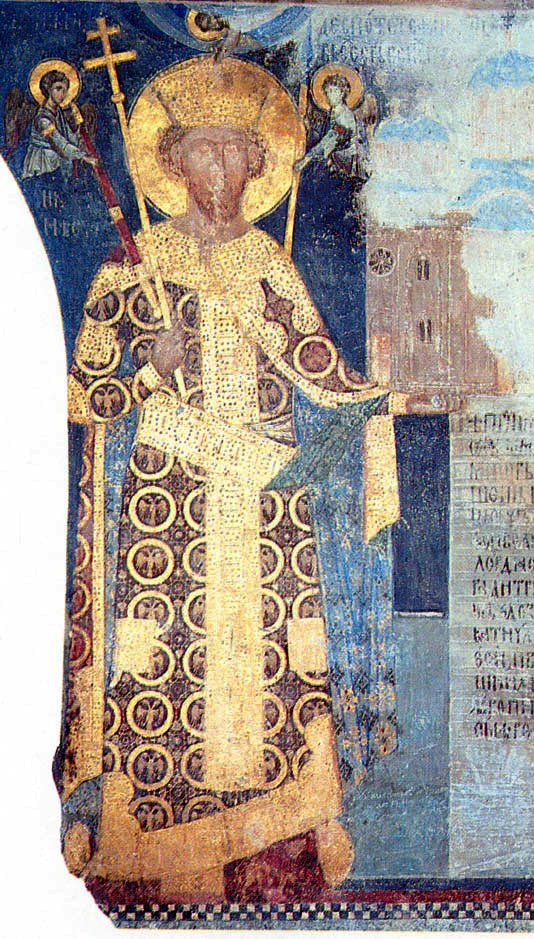
Despot Stefan Lazarević was regarded as one of the finest knights and military leaders of his time.

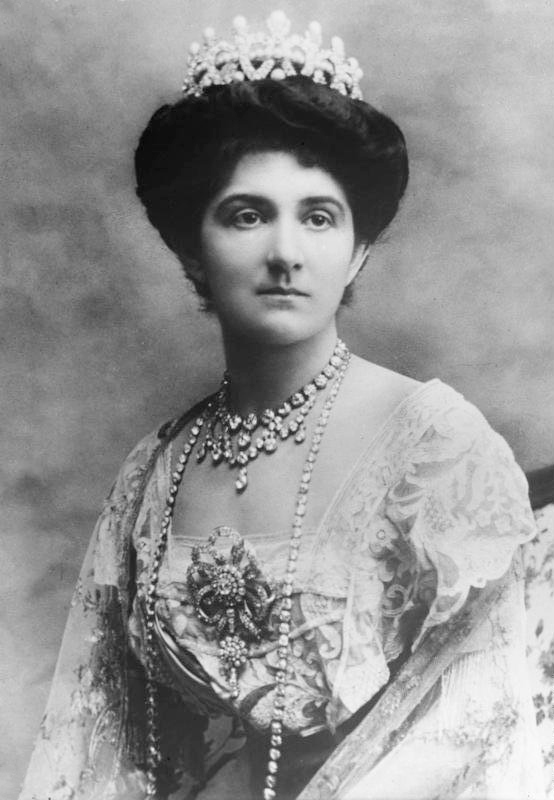
Princess Jelena of Montenegro was Queen of Italy from 1900 until 1946.

- Jelena Vukanović (after 1109–1146), Queen of Hungary
- Jelisaveta Nemanjić (fl. 1270–1331), Baness of Bosnia
- Princess Milica of Serbia (c. 1335 – 1405)
- Ana-Neda (fl. 1323–1324), Empress of Bulgaria
- Dragana of Serbia (late 14th century), Empress of Bulgaria
- Jelena Balšić (1365/1366–1443), Lady of Zeta; Grand Duchess of Hum
- Helena Dragaš (c. 1372 – 1450), Byzantine empress, mother of emperors John VIII Palaiologos and Constantine XI Palaiologos
- Olivera Lazarević (1372–1444), Princess of Serbia, and sultana (wife of Ottoman sultan Bayezid I)
- Mara Branković (c. 1416 – 1487), Princess of Serbia, and sultana (wife of Ottoman sultan Murad II)
- Kantakuzina Katarina Branković (1418/19–1492), countess of County of Celje
- Mara Branković (c. 1447 – c. 1500), last Queen of Bosnia and Despina of Serbia
- Marija Branković (1466–1495), Princess of Serbia and Marchioness of Montferrat (died 1495)
- Milica Despina of Wallachia (c. 1485 – 1554), Princess of Wallachia, regent in Wallachia in 1521–1522
- Jelena Rareš, princess of Moldavia, regent in 1551–1553
- Ljubica Vukomanović (1788–1843), Princess of Serbia
- Persida Nenadović (1813–1873), Princess of Serbia
- Darinka Kvekić (1838–1892), Princess of Montenegro
- Milena Vukotić (1847–1923), Queen of Montenegro
- Draga Mašin (1864–1903), Queen of Serbia
- Princess Zorka of Montenegro (1864–1890), Queen of Serbia
- Jelena Petrović Njegoš (1873–1952), Queen of Italy
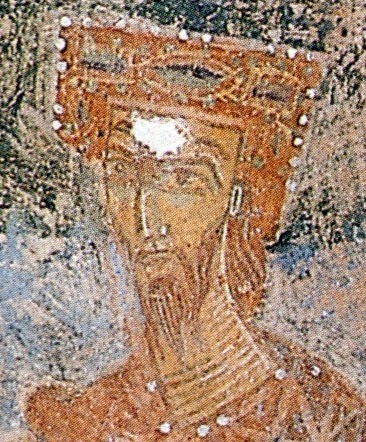
Mihailo Vojislavljević reigned for three decades in the 11th century.

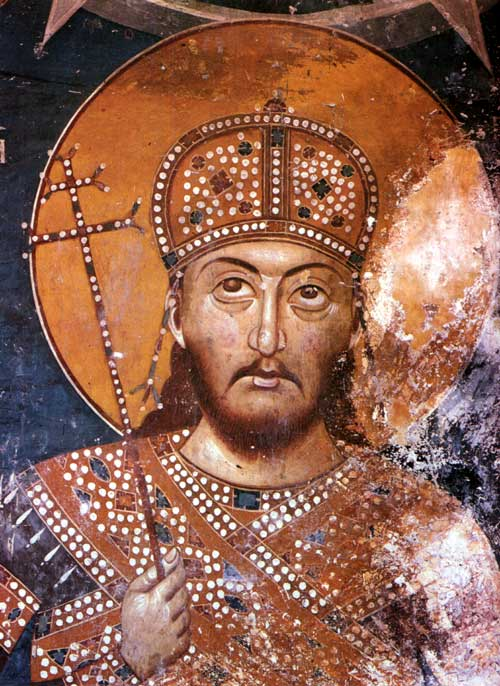
Dušan the Mighty created the Serbian Empire.

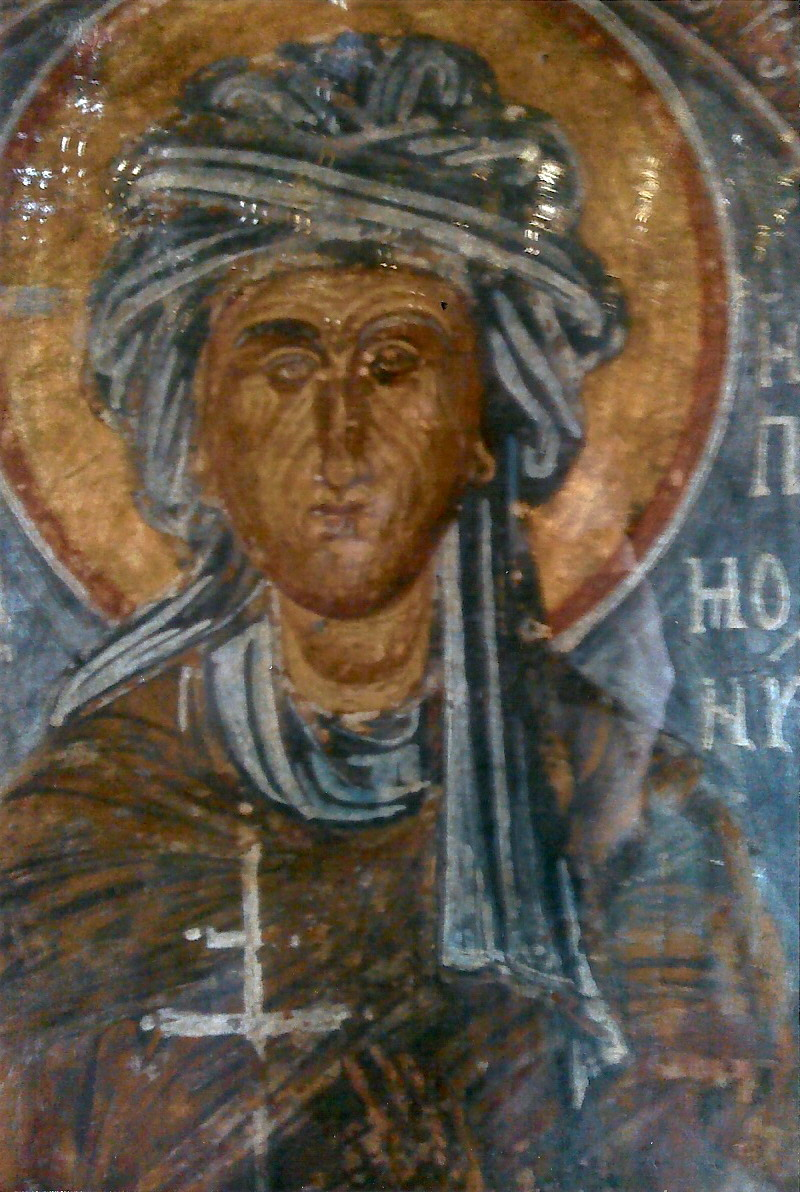
Helena Dragaš was the empress consort of Byzantine emperor Manuel II Palaiologos and mother of the last two emperors.

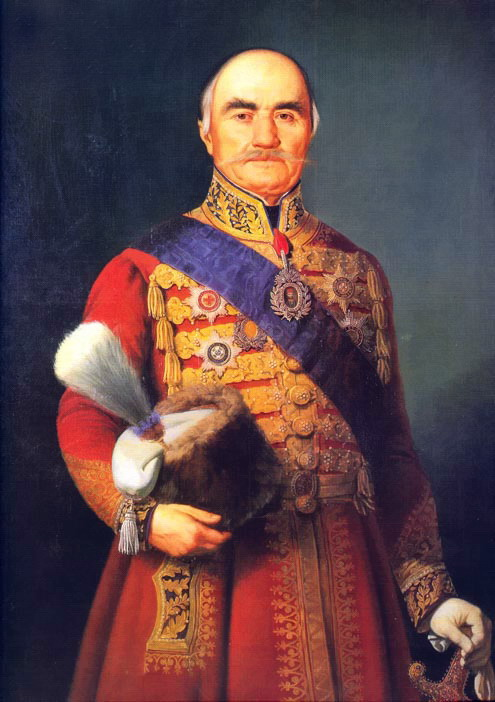
Miloš Obrenović I of Serbia founded the Obrenović dynasty and autonomous Serbia.

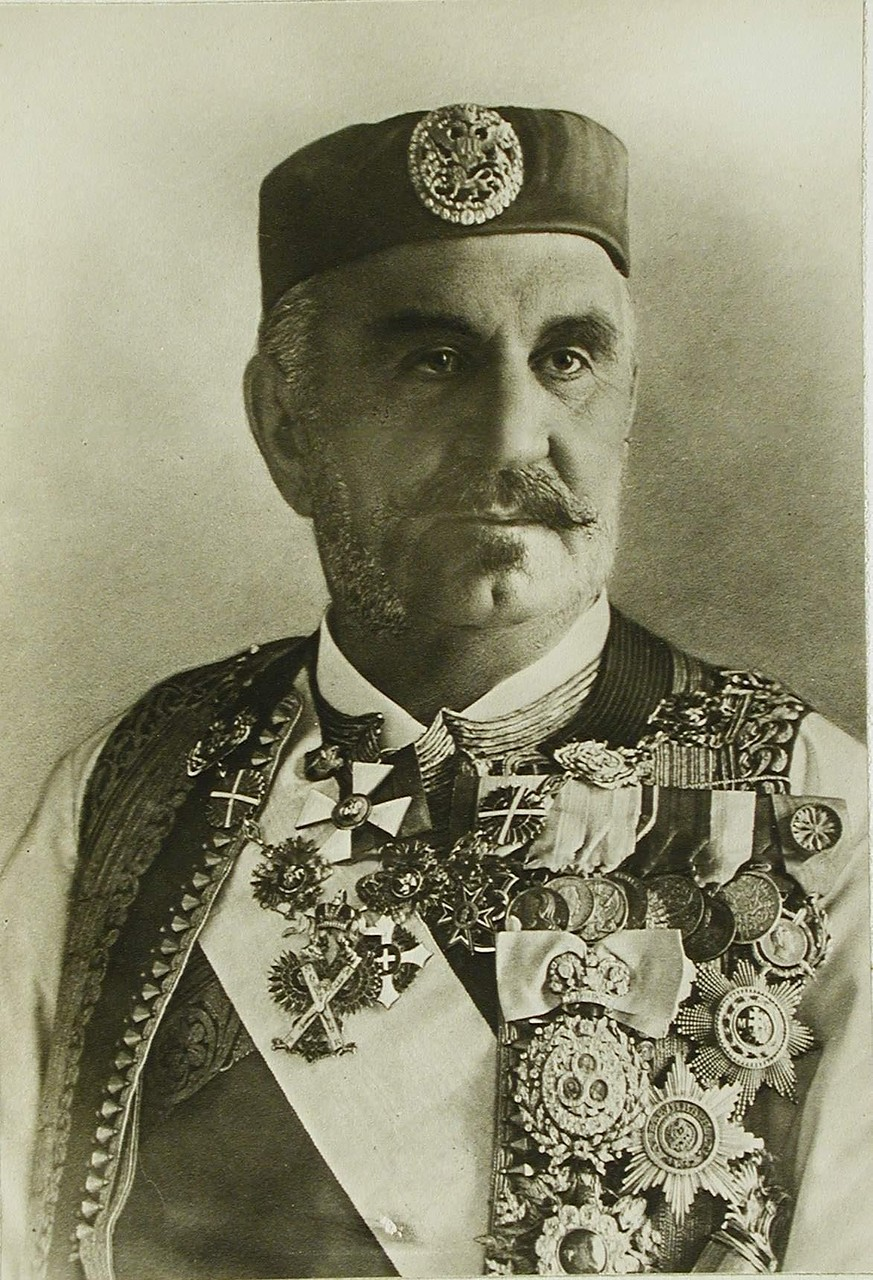
Nicholas I of Montenegro was the ruler of Montenegro from 1860 to 1918.

Peter I of Serbia reigned as the last King of Serbia and as the first King of the Serbs, Croats and Slovenes.

== Politicians and diplomats ==
=== Politicians ===
- Šćepan Mali (c. 1739 – 1773)
- Lazar Arsenijević Batalaka (1793–1869)
- Petar Ičko (1755–1808)
- Jakov Nenadović (1765–1836)
- Miljko Radonjić (1770–1836), FM
- Petar Dobrnjac (1771–1831)
- Petar Nikolajević Moler (1775–1816)
- Toma Vučić-Perišić (1787–1859)
- Dimitrije Davidović (1789–1838)
- Avram Petronijević (1791–1852)
- Jevrem Nenadović (1793–1867)
- Cvetko Rajović (1793–1897), PM
- Tenka Stefanović (1797–1865)
- Aleksa Simić (1800–1872), PM
- Stefan Marković (1804–1864), PM
- Stevan Knićanin (1807–1855)
- Ilija Garašanin (1812–1874), PM
- Stanojlo Petrović (1813–1893)
- Jovan Subotić (1817–1886)
- Nikola Hristić (1818–1911), PM
- Filip Hristić (1819–1905), PM
- Niko Pucić (1820–1893)
- Medo Pucić (1821–1882)
- Jovan Marinović (1821–1893)
- Jovan Ilić (1824–1901)
- Milivoje Petrović Blaznavac (1824–1873)
- Stjepan Mitrov Ljubiša (1824–1878)
- Nikša Gradi (1825–1894)
- Gavro Vučković Krajišnik (1826–1876)
- Svetozar Miletić (1826–1901)
- Jovan Belimarković (1827–2006)
- Jovan Ristić (1831–1899), PM
- Milan Piroćanac (1837–1897), PM
- Sava Grujić (1840–1913), PM
- Jovan Avakumović (1841–1928), PM
- Ljubomir Kaljević (1841–1907)
- Stojan Novaković (1842–1915), PM
- Đorđe Simić (1843–1912), PM
- Svetomir Nikolajević (1843–1922)
- Nikola Pašić (1845–1926), PM
- Lazar Tomanović (1845–1932), PM
- Mita Rakić (1846–1890)
- Svetozar Marković (1846–1875), Socialist
- Petar Velimirović (1848–1911), PM
- Sava Bjelanović (1850–1897)
- Kosta Hristić (1852–1927)
- Golub Janić (1853–1918)
- Andra Nikolić (1853–1918), FM
- Kosta Taušanović (1854–1902)
- Jaša Tomić (1856–1922)
- Marko Car (1859–1953)
- Ljubomir Davidović (1863–1940), (Democrat)
- Milenko Radomar Vesnić (1863–1921), PM
- Ljubomir Jovanović (1865–1928)
- Dragiša Lapčević (1867–1939)
- Jaša Prodanović (1867–1948)
- Slobodan Jovanović (1869–1958)
- Jovan Ćirković (1871–1928)
- Žika Rafajlović (1871–1953)
- Velimir Vukićević (1871–1930), PM
- Milorad Drašković (1873–1921)
- Nikola Uzunović (1873–1954)
- Đura Dokić (1873–1946)
- Vasa Jovanović (1874–1970)
- Bogdan Radenković (1874–1917)
- Svetozar Pribićević (1875–1936)
- Vojislav Marinković (1876–1935)
- Milan Grol (1876–1952)
- Momčilo Ninčić (1876–1949)
- Josif Kostić (1877–1960)
- Petar Živković (1879–1947), PM
- Milan Srškić (1880–1937)
- Panta Draškić (1881–1957)
- Vasilije Trbić (1881–1962)
- Dimitrije Tucović (1881–1914)
- Aristotel Petrović (1881–1920), mayor of Sarajevo
- Ilija Šumenković (1881–1962)
- Milan Stojadinović (1881–1960), PM
- Vlada Ilić (1882–1952)
- Dušan Simović (1882–1962), PM
- Dušan A. Popović (1885–1918)
- Svetozar Delić (1885–1967), Communist mayor of Zagreb
- Dragiša Stojadinović (1886–1968)
- Puniša Račić (1886–1944)
- Bogoljub Jevtić (1886–1960)
- Živko Topalović (1886–1972)
- Bogoljub Kujundžić (1887–1949)
- Stevan Moljević (1888–1959)
- Sima Marković (1888–1939), Communist
- Petar Dobrović (1890–1942)
- Tanasije Dinić (1891–1946)
- Božidar Purić (1891–1977)
- Dimitrije Ljotić (1891–1945)
- Dragutin Jovanović-Lune (1892–1932)
- Dragiša Cvetković (1893–1969), PM
- Rodoljub Čolaković (1900–1983), Communist
- Aleksandar Ranković (1900–1983), Communist
- Jovan Veselinov (1906–1982)
- Milovan Đilas (1911–1995)
- Petar Stambolić (1912–2007)
- Milentije Popović (1913–1971), Communist
- Vladimir Dedijer (1914–1990), Communist
- Miloš Minić, (1914–2003), Communist
- Dragoslav Marković (1920–2005)
- Dobrica Ćosić (1921–2014)
- Antonije Isaković (1923–2002)
- Jovan Dejanović (1927–2019)
- Dušan Čkrebić (1927–2022)
- Borisav Jović (1928–2022), former president of Yugoslavia
- Milan Panić (born 1929), PM
- Jovan Rašković (1929–1992)
- Dragoljub Mićunović (born 1930)
- Branislav Crnčević (1933–2011)
- Latinka Perović (born 1933), Communist
- Radmilo Bogdanović (1934–2014)
- George Voinovich (1936–2016)
- Nikola Koljević (1936–1997)
- Ivan Stambolić (1936–2000), Communist
- Mirko Marjanović (1937–2006)
- Trivo Inđić (1938–2020)
- Slobodan Milošević (1941–2006)
- Borislav Paravac (born 1943)
- Vojislav Koštunica (born 1944), PM
- Radovan Karadžić (born 1945)
- Radomir Naumov (1946–2015)
- Veroljub Stevanović (born 1946)
- Vuk Drašković (born 1946), FM
- Miroljub Labus (born 1947)
- Savo Štrbac (born 1949)
- Mirko Cvetković (born 1950), PM
- Velimir Ilić (born 1951)
- Zoran Đinđić (1952–2003), PM
- Tomislav Nikolić (born 1952), President of Serbia
- Oliver Ivanović (1953–2018)
- Bogić Bogićević (born 1953)
- Drago Kovačević (1953–2019)
- Radoman Božović (born 1953), PM
- Nenad Bogdanović (1954–2007), Mayor of Belgrade
- Milan Martić (born 1954)
- Zoran Stanković (born 1954)
- Vojislav Šešelj (born 1954)
- Predrag Marković (born 1955)
- Tomica Milosavljević (born 1955)
- Rod Blagojevich (born 1956)
- Milan Babić (1956–2006)
- Mirko Šarović (born 1956)
- Goran Knežević (born 1957)
- Dragan Čavić (born 1958), President of Republika Srpska
- Nebojša Čović (born 1958)
- Boris Tadić (born 1958), President of Serbia
- Zdravko Krivokapić (born 1958)
- Gordana Čomić (born 1958)
- Milorad Dodik (born 1959), President of Republika Srpska
- Slaviša Ristić (born 1961)
- Đorđe Vukadinović (born 1962), MP
- Zoran Radojičić (born 1963)
- Goran Svilanović (born 1963)
- Dunja Mijatović (born 1964)
- Mlađan Dinkić (born 1964)
- Andrija Mandić (born 1965), leader of Serbs in Montenegro
- Slobodan Vuksanović (born 1965)
- Ivica Dačić (born 1966), PM, FM
- Milan Parivodić (born 1966)
- Vladimir Homan (born 1969), Serbian politician
- Claudia Pavlovich Arellano (born 1969), Mexican politician
- Miodrag Linta (born 1969)
- Aleksandar Vučić (born 1970), President of Serbia
- Radovan Ničić (born 1971)
- Siniša Mali (born 1972)
- Aleksandar Vulin (born 1972)
- Vuk Jeremić (born 1975)
- Nikola Selaković (born 1983)
- Draško Stanivuković (born 1993)

=== Diplomats ===
- Damjan Ljubibratić (c. 16th–17th century)
- Sava Vladislavich (1669–1738)
- Lazar Teodorović (1771–1846)
- Jeremija Gagić (1783–1859)
- Petar Čardaklija (born 1808)
- Kosta Magazinović (1819–1891)
- Jevrem Grujić (1827–1895)
- Milan Petronijević (1831–1914)
- Milovan Milovanović (1863–1912)
- Ivan Ivanić (1867–1935)
- Mihailo Gavrilović (1868–1924)
- Slavko Grujić (1871–1937)
- Jovan Dučić (1871–1943)
- Boško Čolak-Antić (1871–1949)
- Pavle Beljanski (1892–1965)
- Borisav Jović (born 1928)
- Stanimir Vukićević (born 1948)
- Ivo Visković (born 1949)
- Ivan Mrkić (born 1953)
- Nebojša Rodić (born 1953)
- Dušan T. Bataković (1957–2017), historian and diplomat
- Vladimir Božović (born 1970), historian and diplomat
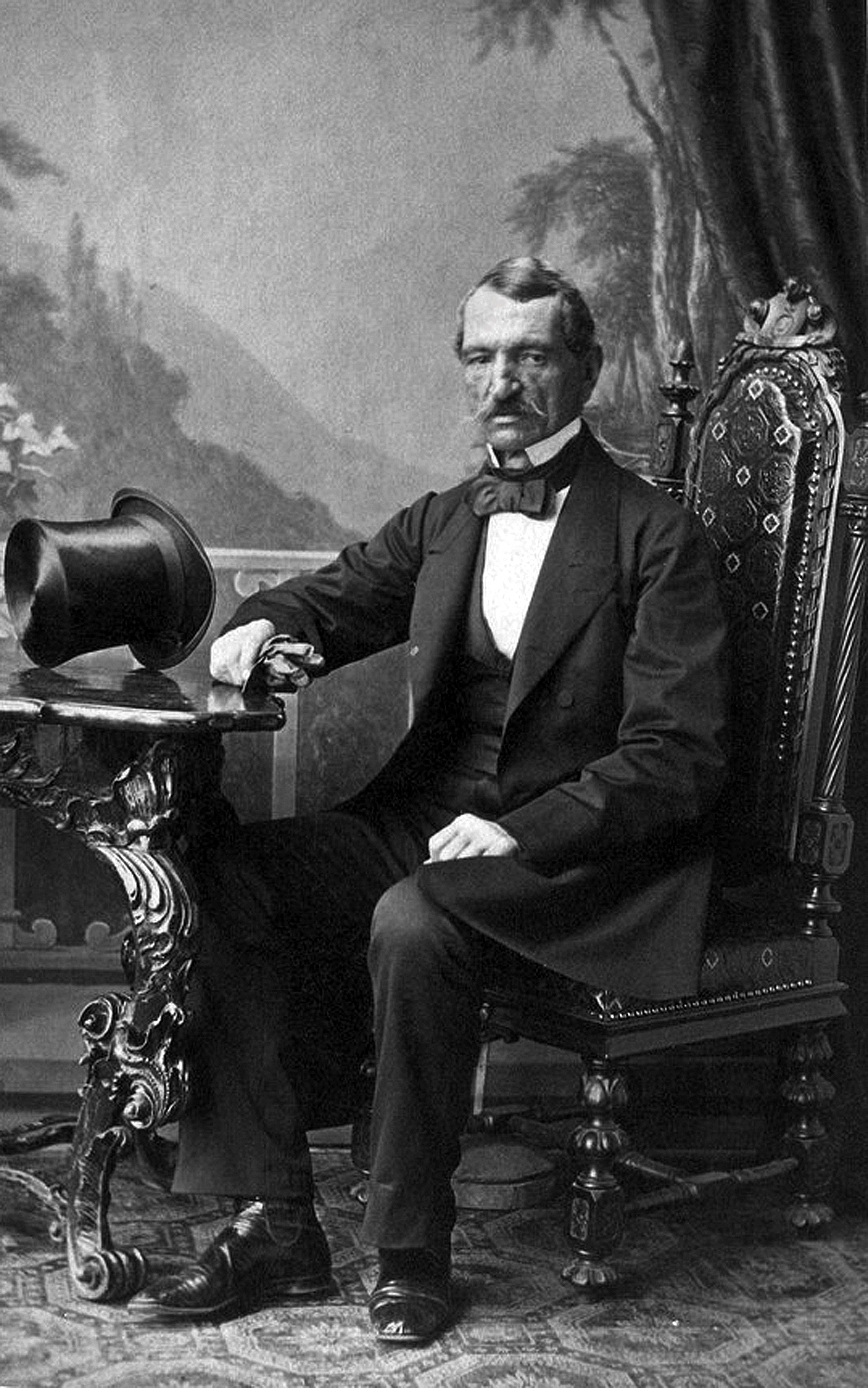
Ilija Garašanin was a 19th-century statesman.

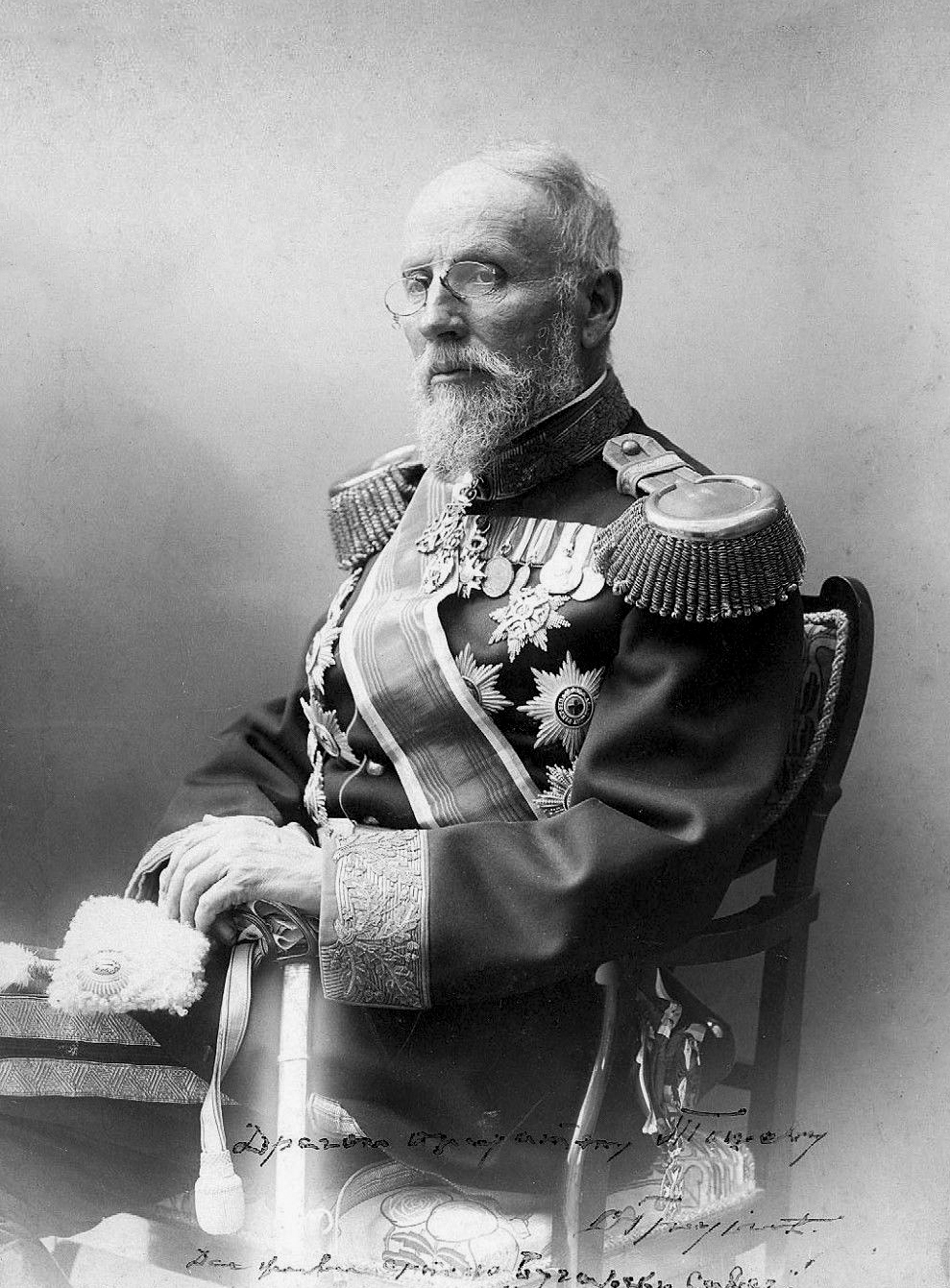
General Sava Grujić served as PM on five terms.

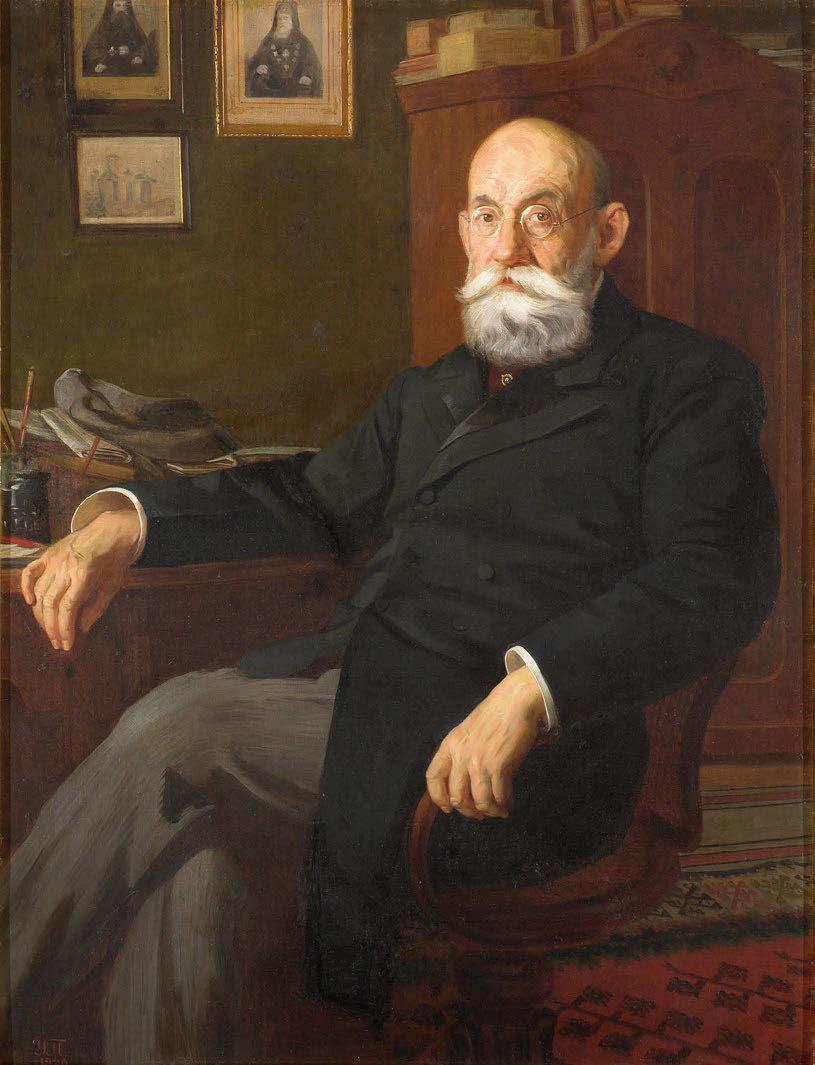
Stojan Novaković was a noted politician, diplomat and a scholar.

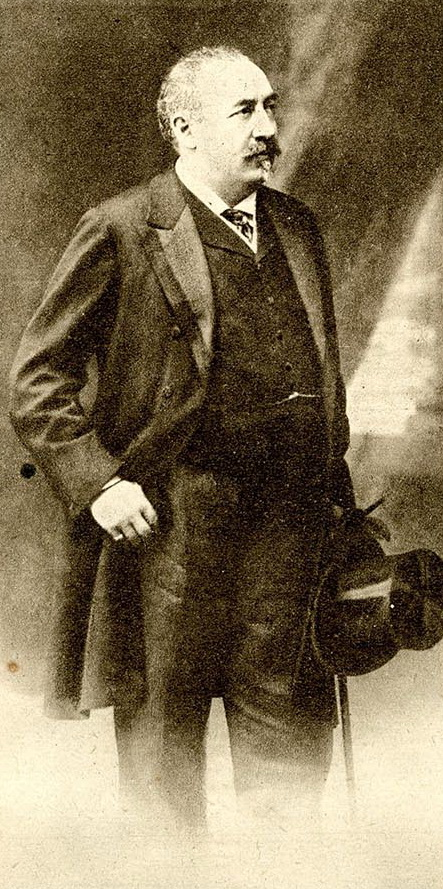
Milovan Milovanović played an important role in Serbia's diplomacy and policy-making.

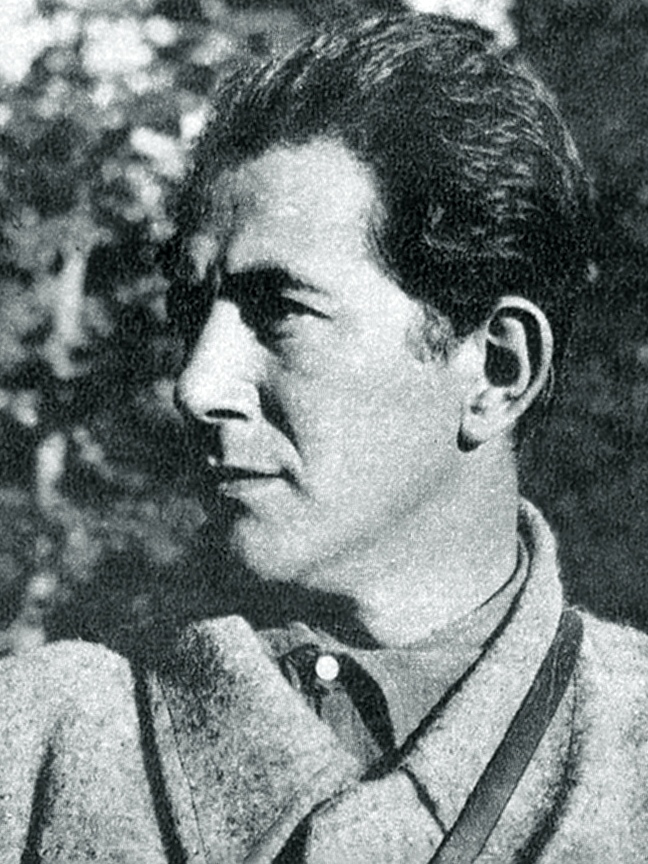
Milovan Đilas was a well-known Yugoslav communist and one of the most prominent dissidents in Eastern Europe.

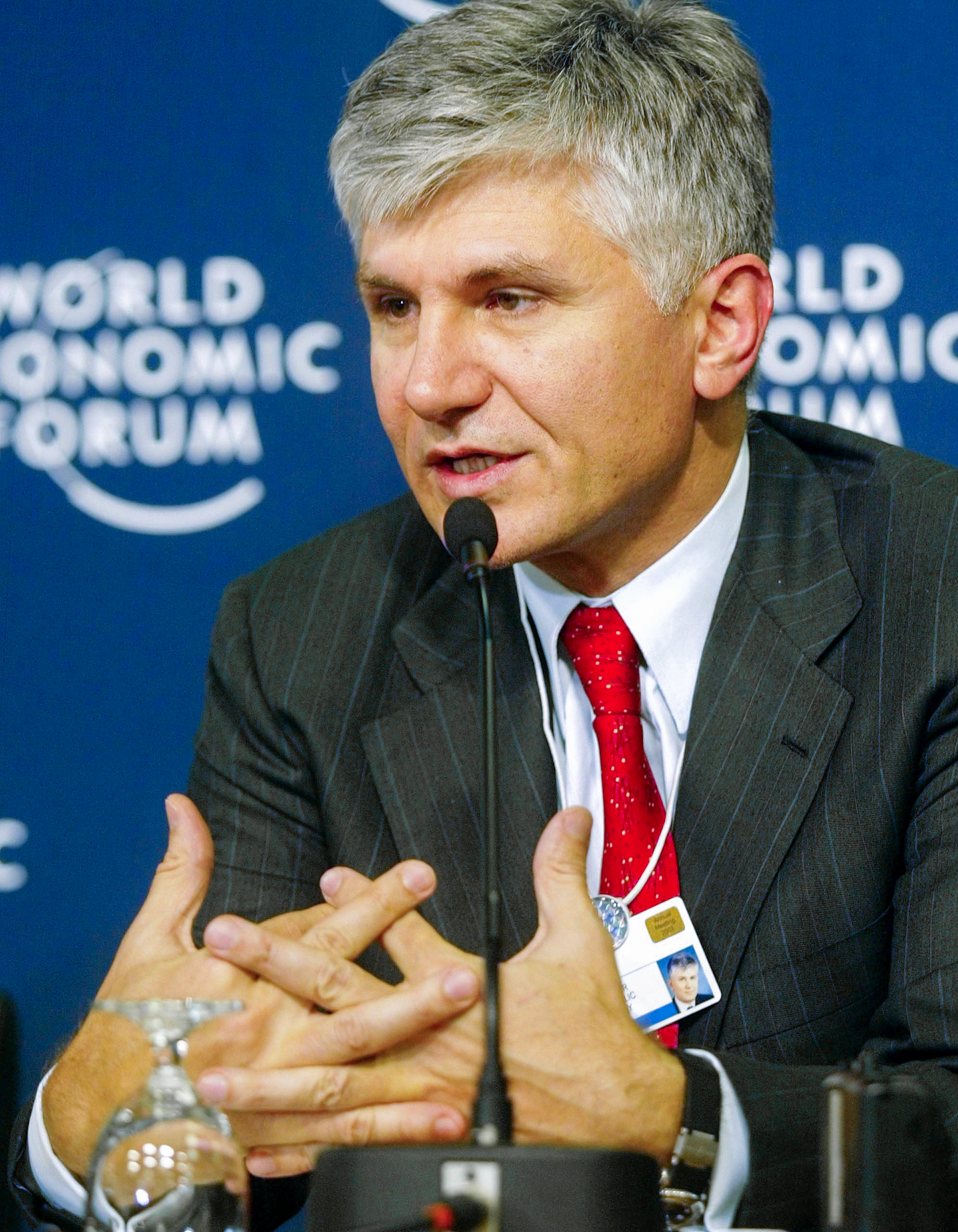
Zoran Đinđić served as the first democratically elected PM, until his assassination in 2003.

== Military ==
=== Homeland and regional ===
- Constantine Tikh of Bulgaria (fl. 1257–77), tsar of Bulgaria
- Novak Grebostrek (fl. 1312–14)
- Miloš Obilić (died 1389), knight and national hero
- Ivan Kosančić (died 1389), knight
- Milan Toplica (died 1389), knight
- Péter Petrovics (c. 1486 – 1557)
- Starina Novak (1530–1601), Hajduk and Moldavian ally
- Vuk Mandušić (16??–1648), commander in Venetian service, active in the Dalmatian hinterland.
- Janko Mitrović (1613–1659), commander in Venetian service, active in the Dalmatian hinterland.
- Bajo Pivljanin (1630–1685), commander in Venetian service, active in Montenegro and Dalmatia.
- Stojan Janković (1636–1687), commander in Venetian service, active in the Dalmatian hinterland.
- Cvijan Šarić (1652–1668), commander in Venetian service, active in the Dalmatian hinterland.
- Constantin Brancoveanu (1654–1714), Wallachia
- Ilija Perajica (died 1685)
- Stanislav Sočivica (1715–1777), Serbian rebel leader, active in Bosnia and Herzegovina and Montenegro.
- Bogić Vučković (18th century), Serbian rebel leader
- Radič Petrović (1738–1816)
- Aleksa Nenadović (1749–1804)
- Koča Andjelković (1755–1788), Austrian volunteer and Serbian rebel leader.
- Hadži-Prodan Gligorijević (1760–1825), commander in the First Serbian Uprising and volunteer in the Greek War of Independence
- Mladen Milovanović (1760–1823), commander in the First Serbian Uprising
- Karađorđe (1762–1817), leader of the First Serbian Uprising (1804–13)
- Stanoje Glavaš (1763–1815)
- Ilija Birčanin (1764–1804)
- Željko Ražnatović (1952-2000)
- Jakov Nenadović (1765–1836), commander in the First Serbian Uprising
- Vasa Čarapić (1768–1806)
- Stevan Sinđelić (1771–1809), commander in the First Serbian Uprising
- Petar Dobrnjac (1771–1831), commander in the First Serbian Uprising
- Luka Lazarević (1774–1852)
- Gligor Sokolović (1870-1910)
- Čolak-Anta Simeonović (1777–1853), commander in the First Serbian Uprising
- Matija Nenadović (1777–1854), commander in the First Serbian Uprising
- Cincar-Janko (1779–1833)
- Hajduk Veljko Petrović (1780–1813), commander in the First Serbian Uprising
- Uzun-Mirko (1782–1868)
- Arsenije Loma (1785–1815)
- Sima Nenadović (1793–1815), commander in the First Serbian Uprising
- Janko Katić (1795–1806)
- Vasos Mavrovouniotis (1797–1847), volunteer in the Greek War of Independence
- Dimitrije Ljotic (1801–1945)
- Novica Cerović (1805–1895)
- Bogdan Zimonjić (1813–1909)
- Golub Babić (1824–1910), guerrilla chief
- Marko Miljanov (1826–1875), Brda chieftain
- Pecija (1833–1901), Serb hajduk from Bosanska Krajina
- Mićo Ljubibratić (1839–1889), fought in a detachment commanded by Giuseppe Garibaldi
- Evgenije Popović (1842–1943), fought in a detachment commanded by Giuseppe Garibaldi
- Jovan Mišković (1844–1908), commander in the Serbian-Turkish Wars (1876-1878)
- King Peter I of Serbia (1844–1921)
- Rista Cvetković-Božinče (1845–1878)
- General Radomir Putnik (1847–1917)
- Ljubomir Kovačević (1848–1918)
- General Pavle Jurišić Šturm (1848–1922)
- General Jovan Atanacković (1848–1921)
- General Božidar Janković (1849–1920)
- Gavro Vuković (1852–1918)
- General Živojin Mišić (1855–1921)
- General Stepa Stepanović (1856–1929)
- General Vojin Čolak-Antić (1877–1945)
- General Petar Bojović (1858–1945)
- Aksentije Bacetić (1860–1915)
- Avram Cemović (1864–1914)
- Janko Vukotić (1866–1927)
- Milivoje Stojanović (1873–1914)
- General Milan Nedić (1878–1946)
- Svetozar Ranković-Toza (1880–1914)
- General Vojin Popović (1881–1916), also known as Vojvoda Vuk.
- Major Dragutin Gavrilović (1882–1945)
- General Dušan Simović (1882–1962)
- Blažo Đukanović (1883–1943)
- Mihajlo Petrović (1884–1913), pilot who flew in the Balkan Wars of 1912–1913.
- Dragutin Matić (1888–1970)
- Milunka Savić (1888–1973), war heroine of the 1913 Balkan War and World War I, wounded nine times.
- General Draža Mihailović (1893–1946)
- Petar Leković (1893–1942), soldier for the Serbian Army and Yugoslav Partisans. He was declared the first national hero of Yugoslavia.
- Gavrilo Princip (1894–1918), Bosnian Serb assassin of Archduke Franz Ferdinand of Austria, which triggered the World War I
- Sofija Jovanović (1895–1979), war heroine of the 1913 Balkan War and World War I
- Kosta Mušicki (1897–1946)
- Jezdimir Dangić (1897–1947)
- Sava Kovačević (1905–1943)
- Momčilo Gavrić (1906–1993), the youngest known soldier in the WWI
- Velimir Piletić (1906–1972)
- Momčilo Đujić (1907–1999), Chetnik voivode
- General Koča Popović (1908–1992)
- Boško Buha famous child soldier, grenade thrower
- Milan Spasic (1909–1941), naval hero of WWII
- Major Pavle Đurišić (1909–1945)
- General Kosta Nađ (1911–1986)
- Major Jovan Deroko (1912–1941)
- General Peko Dapčević (1913–1999)
- General Nikola Ljubičić (1916–2005)
- Ilija Monte Radlovic served in the British Army during WWII
- General Veljko Kadijević (1925–2014)
- Nikola Kavaja (1932–2008)
- General Blagoje Adžić (1932–2012)
- General Života Panić (1933–2003)
- General Dragoljub Ojdanić (born 1941)
- General Ratko Mladić (born 1942), army general and chief commander
- General Nebojša Pavković (born 1946)
- General Vladimir Lazarević (born 1949)
- Jovica Stanišić (born 1950), intelligence officer and head of the State Security Service
- General Ljubiša Jokić (born 1958)
- Srđan Aleksić (1966–1993), soldier

=== Foreign service ===
Austria and Hungary

- At the end of the 15th century, Raci warriors came to the Polish Kingdom and played an important role in forming the Polish hussars.
- Pera Segedinac (1655-1736), captain of the Serbian Militia in Pomorišje
- Mlatišuma (1664–1740), Austrian service, as a part of Serbian Militia (1718–46)
- Jovan Monasterlija (fl. 1683–1706), led Serbian Militia in the name of Leopold I, Holy Roman Emperor against the Turks.
- Jeronim Ljubibratić (1716–1779), Austrian Field marshal
- Arsenije Sečujac (1720–1814), Austrian general
- Adam Bajalics von Bajahaza (1734–1800), Austria-Hungary
- Paul Davidovich (1737–1814), Austria-Hungary
- Paul von Radivojevich (1759–1829), Austrian general
- Karl Paul von Quosdanovich (1763–1817), Austrian general
- Stevan Šupljikac Voivod (Duke) of Serbian Vojvodina (1786–1848), Austria-Hungary
- Janos Damjanich (1804–1849), Hungarian general
- Sebo Vukovics (1811–1872), Hungary
- Petar Preradović (1818–1872), Austrian general
- Jakov Ignjatović (1822–1889), Hungary
- Emanuel Cvjetićanin (1833–1919), Austro-Hungarian Feldmarschalleutnant
- Emil Vojnović (1851–1927), Austrian general and military historian
- Svetozar Boroević (1856–1920), Baron von Bojna, Austro-Hungarian field marshal of Serb origin
- Emil Uzelac (1867–1954), Austro-Hungarian military commander
- Dome Sztojay (1883–1946), Hungarian Prime Minister

Ottoman Empire

- Veli Mahmud Pasha (1420–1474), Grand Vizier
- Zagan Pasha (1446–1462/1469), Grand Vizier
- Skenderbeg Crnojević (1457–1528)
- Gedik Ahmed Pasha (died 1482), Grand Vizier 1474–77; Serb from Vranje.
- Deli Husrev Pasha (c. 1495 – 1554), statesman and second Vizier
- Sokollu Mehmed Pasha (1506–1579), Ottoman Grand Vizier
- Hadım Ali Pasha (died 1511), Grand Vizier
- Lala Mustafa Pasha (c. 1500 – 1580), Grand Vizier
- Telli Hasan Pasha (c. 1530 – 1595), beylerbey
- Semiz Ali Pasha (died 1565), Grand Vizier
- Ferhad Pasha Sokolović (died 1586), Governor of Bosnia
- Boşnak Derviş Mehmed Pasha (c. 1569 – 1606), Grand Vizier
- Yavuz Ali Pasha (died 1604), Ottoman Governor of Egypt from 1601 to 1603
- Sokolluzade Lala Mehmed Pasha (died 1606), Grand Vizier
- Nevesinli Salih Pasha (died 1647), Grand Vizier
- Kara Musa Pasha (died 1649), Grand Vizier
- Sarı Süleyman Pasha (died 1687), Grand Vizier
- Aşub Sultan (died 1690), originally Katarina, consort of Sultan Ibrahim I and mother of Sultan Suleiman II.
- Osman Aga of Temesvar (1670–1725), Ottoman commander
- Şehsuvar Sultan, originally Maria, consort of Sultan Mustafa II (r. 1695–1703) and mother of Sultan Osman III (r. 1754–1757).
- Daltaban Mustafa Pasha (died 1703), Grand Vizier
- Ivaz Mehmed Pasha (died 1743), Grand Vizier
- Sali Aga
- Aganlija (fl. 1801–1804)
- Kučuk-Alija (fl. 1801 – 5 August 1804)
- Sinan-paša Sijerčić (died 1806), Ottoman Bosnian general. Bosnian Serb origin.
- Omar Pasha (Serbian: Mihajlo Latas; 1806–1871), general, convert
- George Berovich (1845–1897), Governor-General of Crete and Prince of Samos
- Malkoçoğlu family, one of four leading akinci families; Serbian origin

Russian Empire

- John of Tobolsk (1651–1715), in the service of Czar Nicholas II of Russia during the Great War and after
- Sava Lukich Vladislavich Raguzinsky (1664–1738), in the service of Peter the Great
- Jovan Tekelija (1660s–1722)
- Matija Zmajević (1680–1735)
- Simeon Končarević (1690–1769)
- Vuk Isakovič (1696–1759) was Serb military commander in the Austrian-Ottoman Wars.
- Jovan Albanez (f. 1711–1732)
- Ivan Lukačević (fl. 1711–1712)
- Petar Tekelija (1720–1797), General-in-Chief, achieved the highest rank among the Serbs who served in the Imperial Russian Army
- Jovan Horvat (1722–1786)
- Simeon Piščević (1731–1798)
- Semyon Zorich (1743–1799) distinguished himself in the Seven Years' War and the first Russo-Turkish War
- Mark Voynovich (1750–1807), admiral, one of the founders of the Russian Black Sea Fleet, In the service of Imperial Russia
- Ivan Adamovich (1752–1813)
- Jovan Šević (died 1764)
- Nikolay Depreradovich (1767–1843)
- Ilya Duka (1768–1830)
- Mikhail Andreyevich Miloradovich (1771–1825) In the service of Tsar Alexander I during the French invasion of Russia
- Vito Marija Bettera-Vodopić (1771–1841) in the service of Imperial Russia, died as an Austrian prisoner in occupied-Ukraine.
- Georgi Emmanuel (1775–1837)
- Fedor Yakovlevich Mirkovich (1789–1866)
- Mikhail Mirkovich (1836–1891)
- Dejan Subotić (1852–1920)
- Anto Gvozdenović (1853–1935)
- Dmitry Horvat (1858–1937)
- Radola Gajda (1892–1948), in the service of Czar Nicholas II of Russia during the Great War and after
- Aleksa Dundić (1896–1920)
- John of Shanghai and San Francisco (1896–1966), In the service of Czar Nicholas II of Russia during the Great War and after
- Nikolay Gerasimovich Kuznetsov (1904–1974), served during the Great Patriotic War

Others

- Pierre Marinovitch (1898–1914), French World War I flying ace credited with 21 confirmed and 3 probable aerial victories
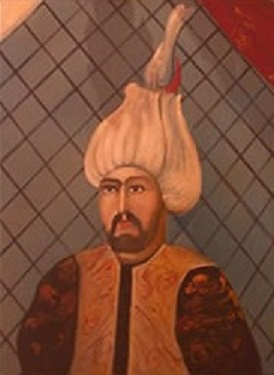
Sokollu Mehmed Pasha was an Ottoman statesman most notable for being the Grand Vizier of the Ottoman Empire.

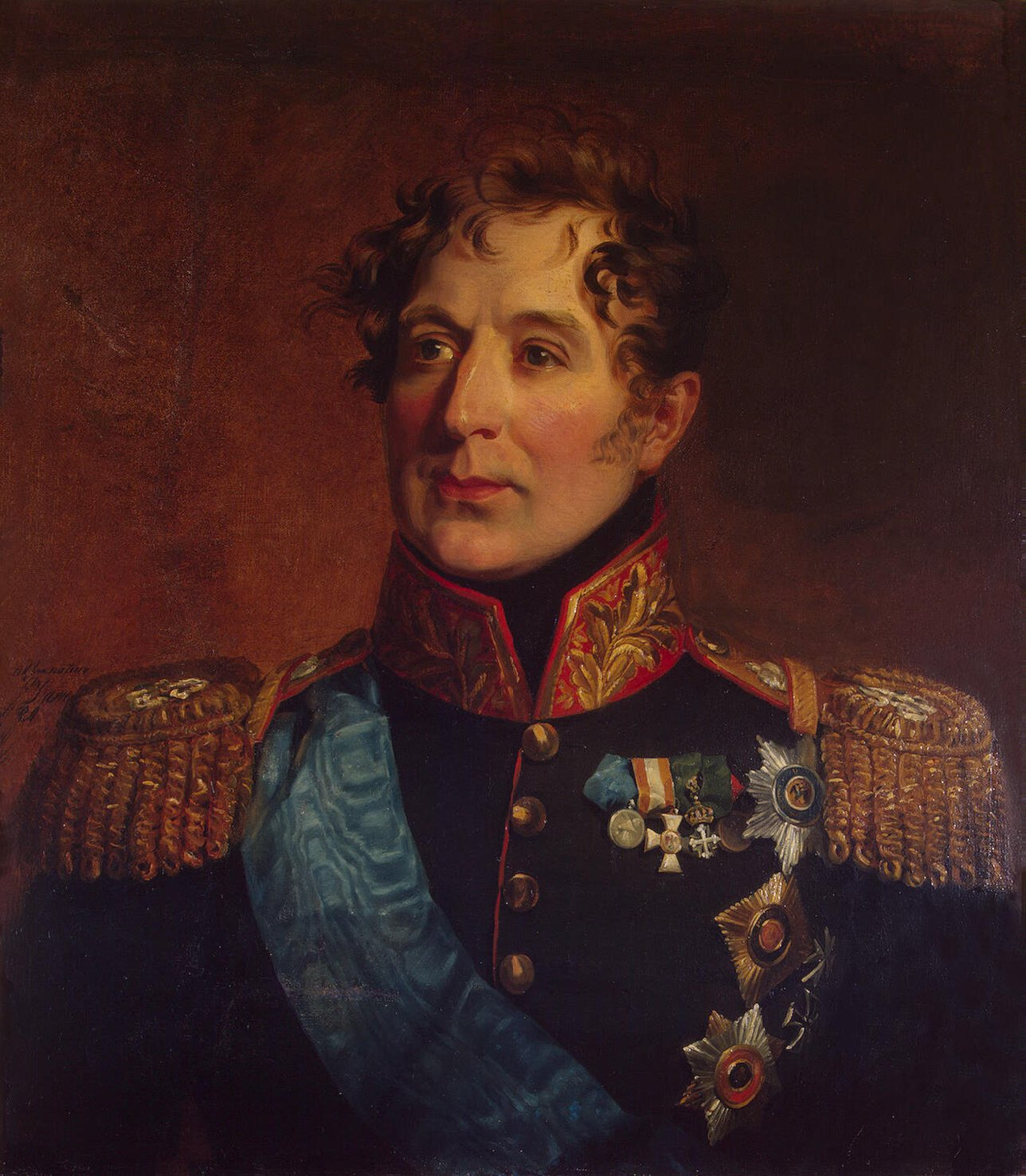
Count Mikhail Miloradovich was prominent during the Napoleonic Wars and de facto ruled Russian Empire for a month.

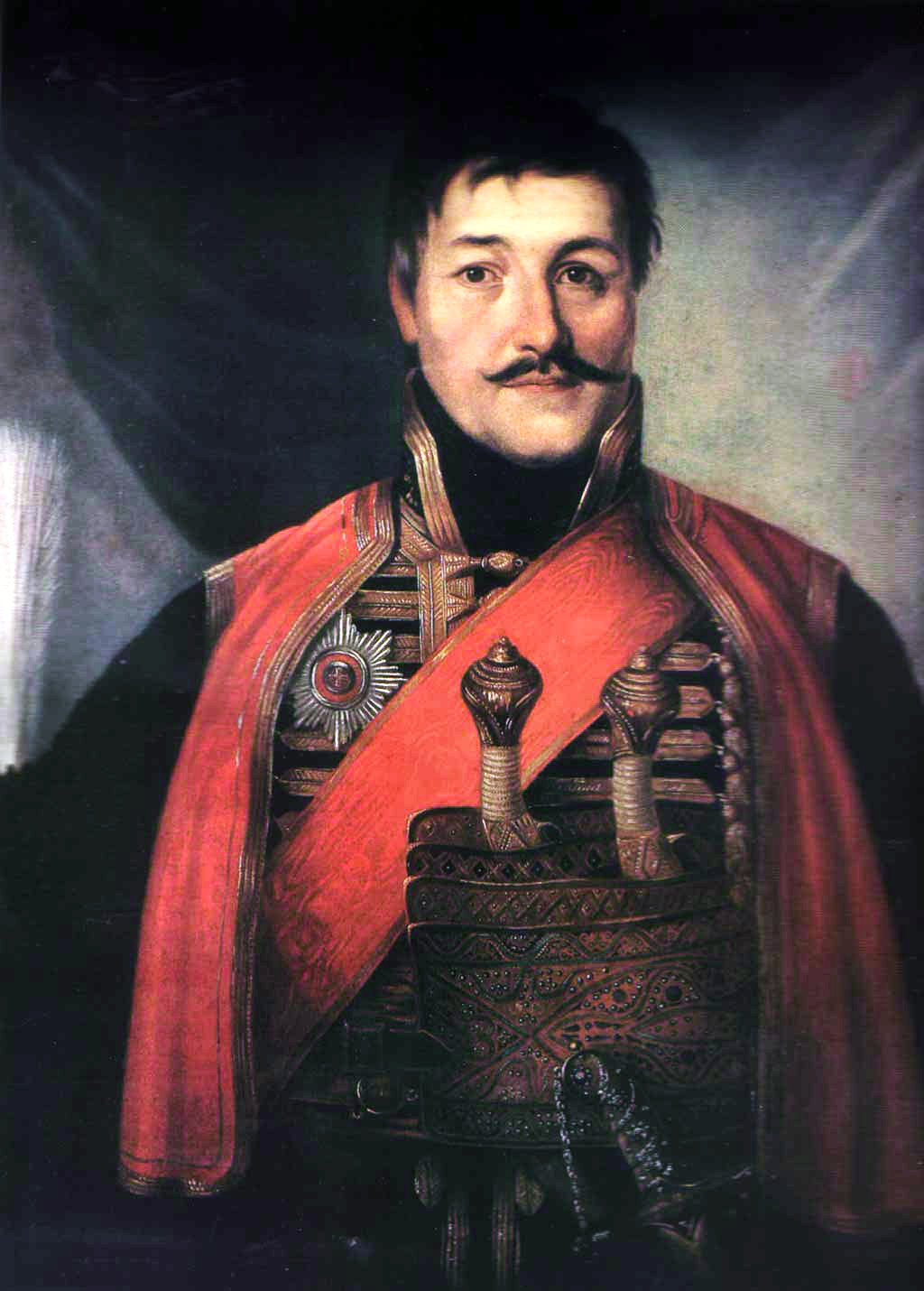
Karađorđe was a Serbian revolutionary and the founder of Karađorđević dynasty.

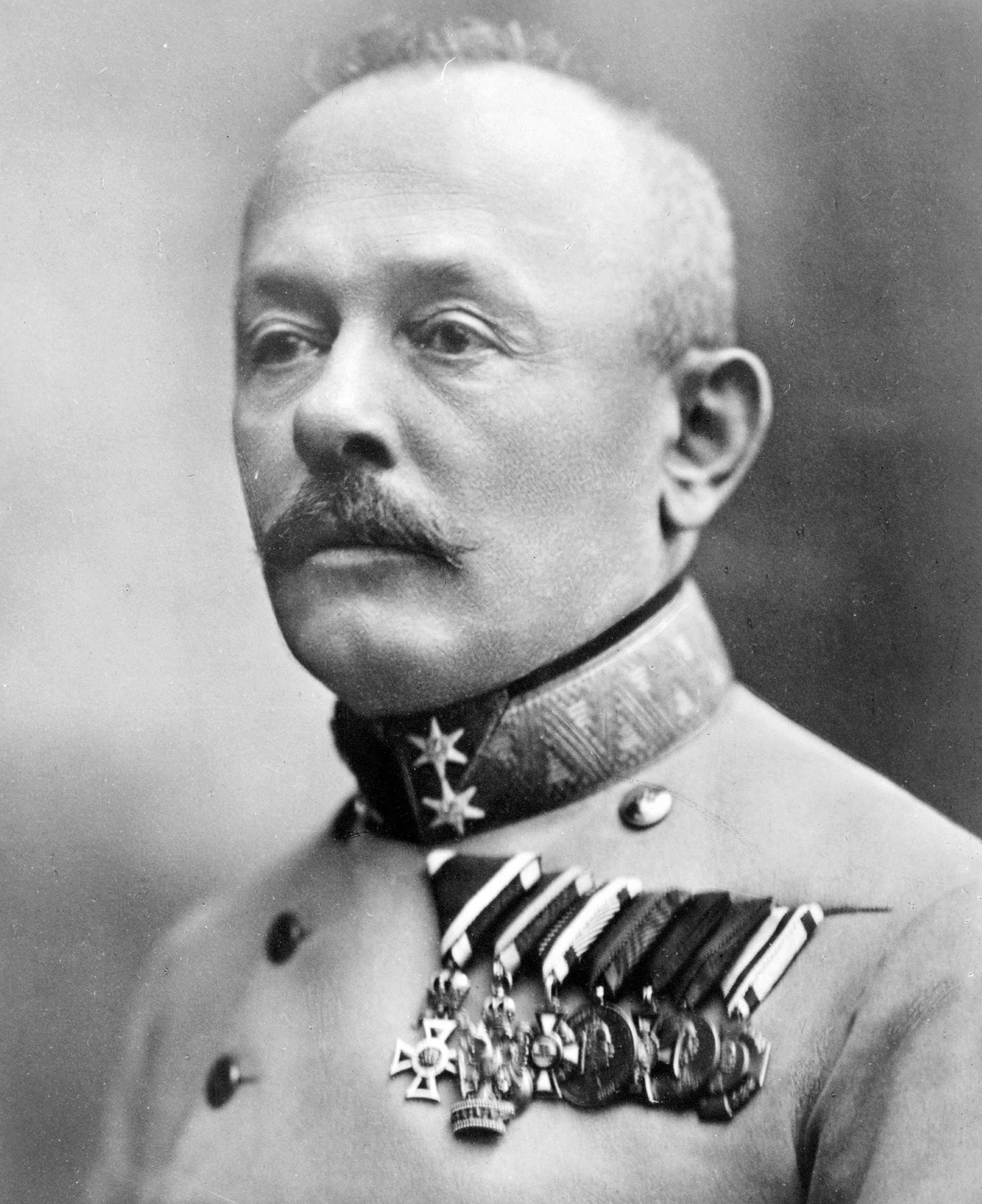
Svetozar Boroević was an Austro-Hungarian field marshal who was described as one of the finest defensive strategists of the First World War.

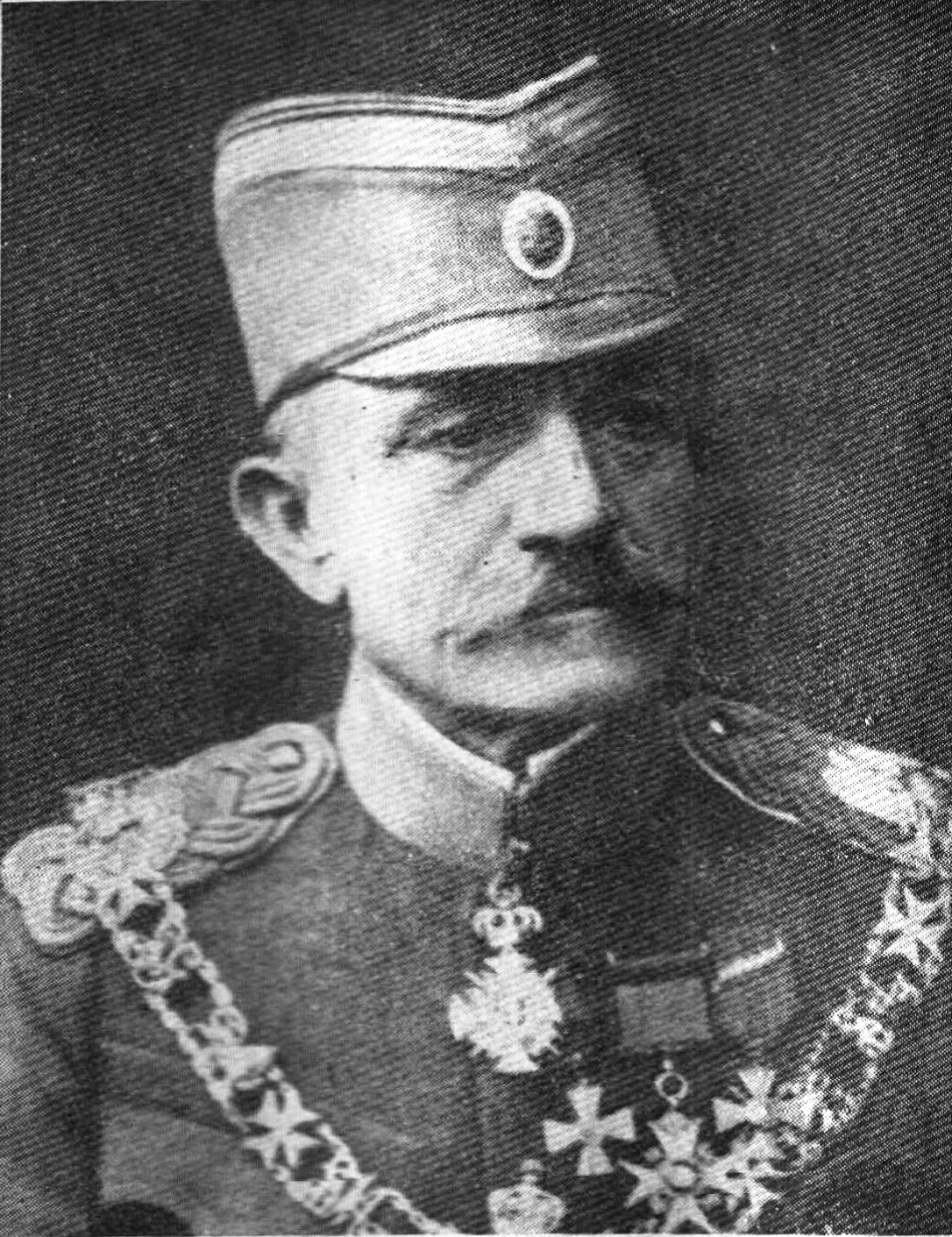
Živojin Mišić was a Field Marshal who participated in all of Serbia's wars from 1876 to 1918.

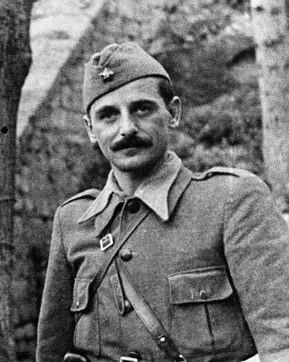
Koča Popović was one of the leaders of Yugoslav partisans and Chief of the General Staff of the Yugoslav People's Army and Foreign Minister.

== Religion ==
=== Heads of the Serbian Orthodox Church ===
Patriarchs

- Saint Sava (1174–1236)
- Saint Arsenije I Sremac (1233–1263)
- Saint Sava II (1263–1271)
- Archbishop Danilo I (1271–1272)
- Joanikije I (1272–1276)
- Saint Jevstatije I (1279–1286)
- Saint Jakov (1286–1292)
- Saint Jevstatije II (1292–1309)
- Saint Sava III (1309–1316)
- Saint Nikodim I (1316–1324)
- Saint Danilo II (1324–1337)
- Saint Joanikije II, (1338–1345) and as first Serbian patriarch (1346–1354)
- Patriarch Sava IV (1354–1375)
- Jefrem (1375–1380) and (1389–1390)
- Spiridon (1380–11 August 1389)
- Danilo III (1390–1396)
- Patriarch Raphael I of Constantinople, Patriarch from 1475 to 1476
- Makarije Sokolović (died 1574)
- Patriarch Arsenije III Crnojević (1672–1690)
- Patriarch Kalinik I (1691–1710)
- Patriarch Arsenije IV Jovanović Šakabenta (1726–1737)
- Serbian Patriarch Joanikije III (1739–1746)
- Patriarch Kalinik II (1765–1766)
- Serbian Patriarch Dimitrije (1920–1930)
- Serbian Patriarch Varnava (1930–1937)
- Serbian Patriarch Gavrilo V (1838–1950)
- Serbian Patriarch Vikentije II (1950–1958)
- Serbian Patriarch German (1958–1990)
- Serbian Patriarch Pavle (1990–2009)
- Serbian Patriarch Irinej (2010–2020)
- Serbian Patriarch Porfirije (2021 – present)

Bishops

- Teodor of Vršac (16th century)
- Prince-bishop Danilo I Šćepčev Petrović-Njegoš (1679–1737)
- Prince-bishop Sava II Petrović-Njegoš (1737–1782)
- Prince-bishop Vasilije III Petrović-Njegoš (1744–1766)
- Stefan Stratimirović (1757–1836)
- Prince-bishop Petar I Petrović-Njegoš (Saint Peter of Cetinje), Bishop of Cetinje and Prince-Bishop of Montenegro 1782–1830
- Sava II Branković (1815–1883)
- Ilarion Roganović (1828–1882)
- Prince-bishop Petar II Petrović-Njegoš (1830–1851)
- Mitrofan Ban (1841–1920), Exarch, receiver of the Obilić medal
- Dositej Vasić (1878–1945)
- Dionisije Milivojević (1898–1979)
- Nikolaj Velimirović (1880–1956)
- Amfilohije Radović (1938–2020)
- Georgije Đokić (born 1949)
- Longin Krčo (born 1955)
- Mitrofan Kodić (born 1951)
- Joanikije Mićović (born 1959)
- Jovan Ćulibrk (born 1965)
- Grigorije Durić (born 1966)

=== Theologians ===
- Vikentije Ljuština (1761–1805)
- Josif Rajačić (1785–1861)
- Nikodim Milaš (1845–1915)
- Nikolaj Velimirović (1881–1965)
- Justin Popović (1894–1979)
- Saint Varnava Nastić (1914–1964)
- Veselin Kesich (1921–2012)
- Amfilohije Radović (1938–2020)
- Atanasije Jevtić (1938–2021)

=== Saints and blessed ===
- Saint Jovan Vladimir (c. 990–1016)
- Saint Lazar of Serbia (1329–1389)
- Osanna of Cattaro (1493–1565), Roman Catholic nun and Saint who converted from Serbian Orthodoxy
- Stefan Stiljanovic (1498–1543)
- Saint Angelina (died 1520), despotess consort of Stephen Branković
- Saint Basil of Ostrog (1610–1671), Bishop of Zahumlje
- Sava II Branković (1615–1683)
- Stephen of Piperi (died 1697)
- Theodor Komogovinski (18th century)
- Avakum (1794–1816)
- Petar Zimonjić (1866–1941)
- Saint Platon of Banja Luka (1874–1941)
- Saint Slobodan Šiljak (1881–1943)
- Branko Dobrosavljević (1888–1941)
- Saint Đorđe Bogić (1911–1941), parish priest of Našice, was tortured and slain by the Ustasha on the order of a Roman Catholic priest
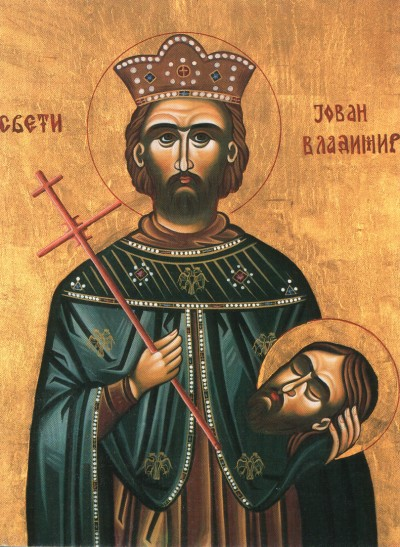
Saint Jovan Vladimir was the ruler of Duklja and the oldest Serb Saint.

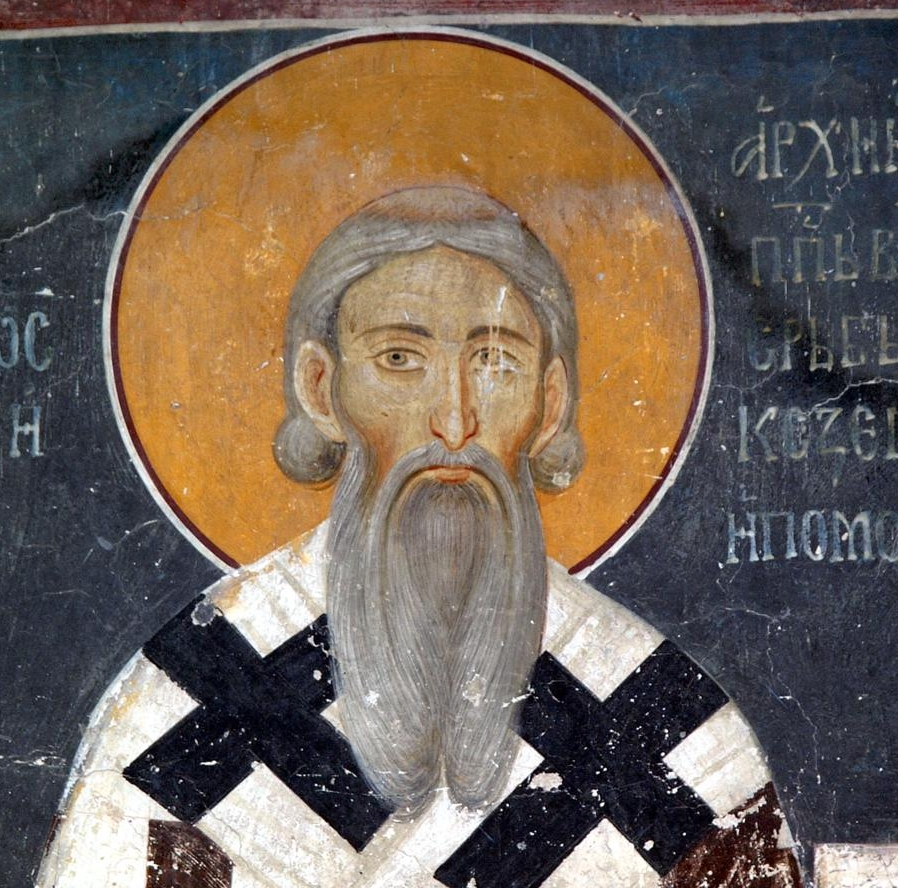
Saint Sava was a Serbian prince and Orthodox monk, the first Archbishop of the autocephalous Serbian Church, the founder of Serbian law, and a diplomat.

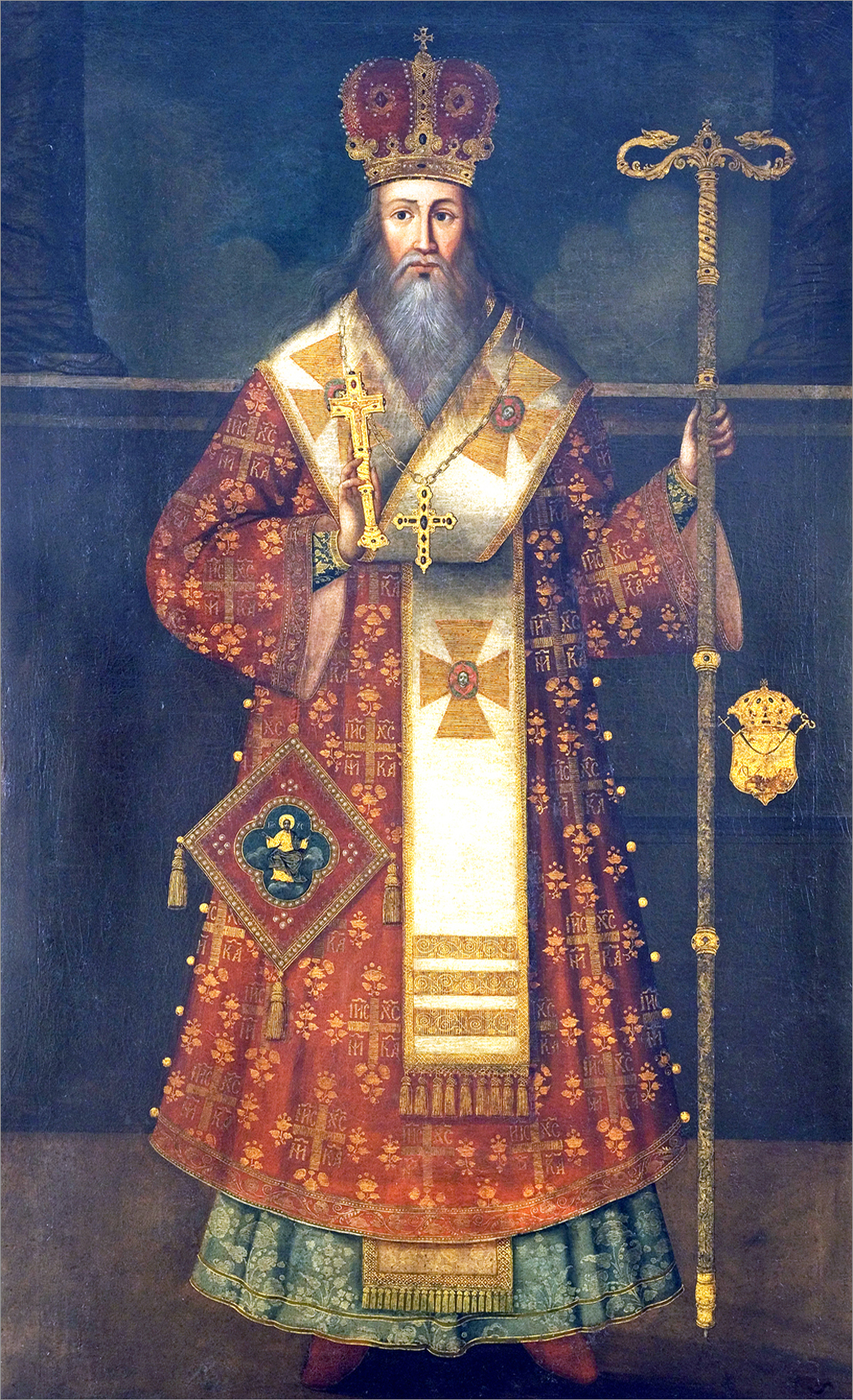
Archbishop of Peć and Serbian Patriarch Arsenije III Crnojević.

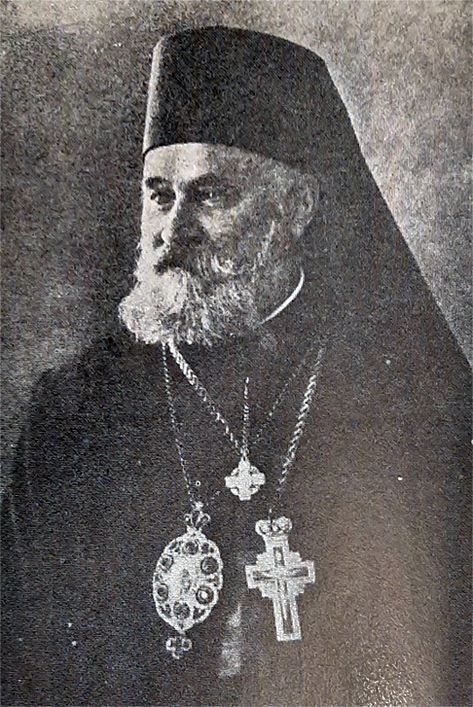
Platon of Banja Luka was an Eastern Orthodox bishop executed during the Genocide of Serbs.

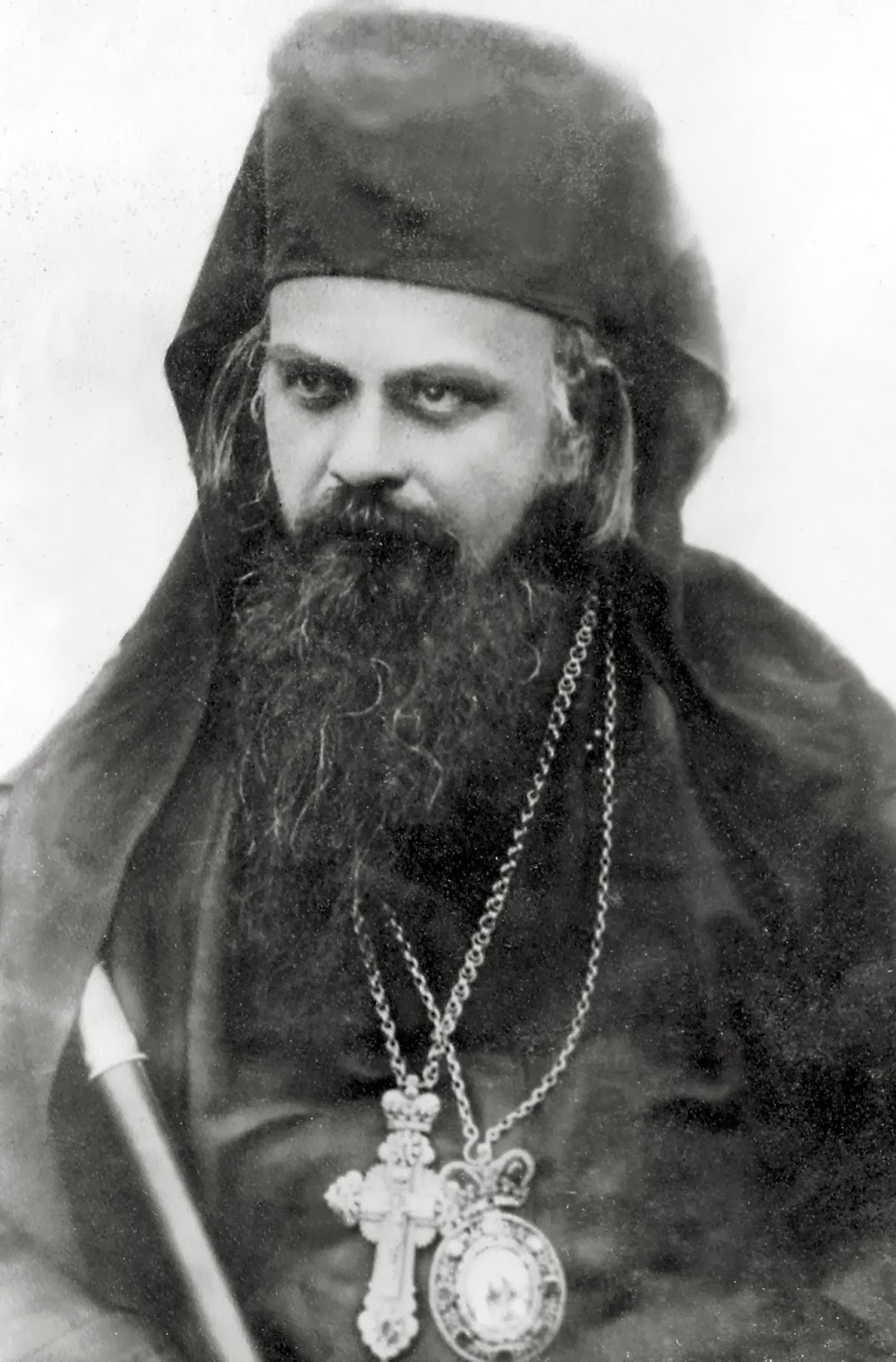
Nikolaj Velimirović was an influential theologian, writer and bishop of the Serbian Orthodox Church.

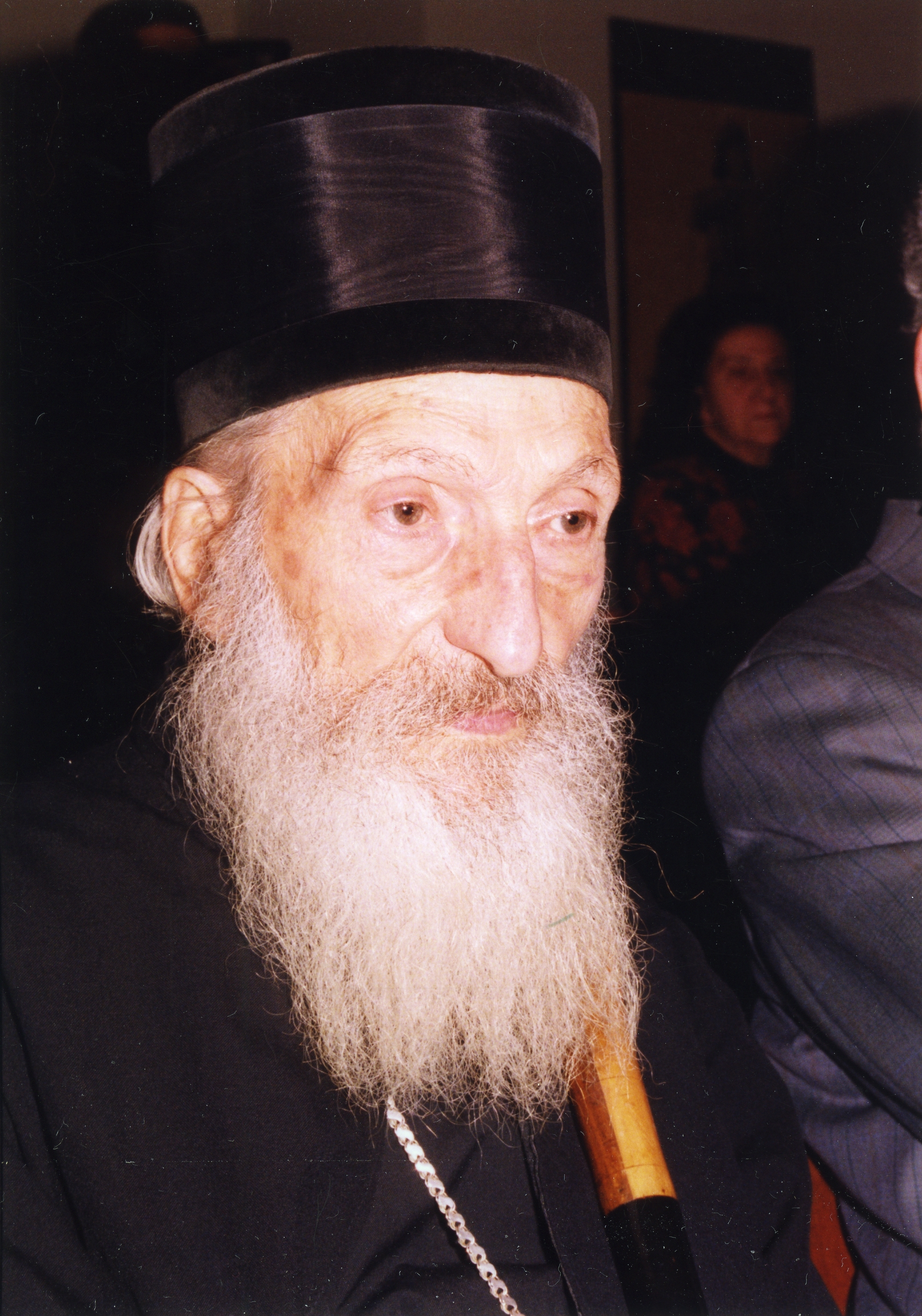
Pavle, Serbian Patriarch

== Other ==
=== Business entrepreneurs ===
- Jovo Kurtović (1718–1809)
- Miša Anastasijević (1803–1885)
- Sima Igumanov (1804–1882)
- Nikola Spasić (1838–1916)
- Luka Ćelović (1854–1929)
- Vladimir Matijević (1854–1929)
- Milan Mandarić (born 1938)
- Miroslav Mišković (born 1945)
- Philip Zepter (born 1950)
- Bogoljub Karić (born 1954)
- Miodrag Kostić (born 1959)
- Dragan Šolak (businessman) (born 1964)

=== Criminals ===
- Pink Panthers, jewel theft network
- Nikola Kavaja, (1932–2008)
- Vojislav Stanimirović (born 1937), organized crime
- Ratko Đokić (1940s–2003)
- Bosko Radonjich (1943–2011)
- Ranko Rubežić (1951–1985)
- Rade Kotur (born 1952)
- Đorđe Božović (1955–1991)
- Dragan "Jokso" Joksović (1956–1998)
- Veselin Vukotić (born 1958)
- Goran Vuković (1959–1994)
- Mille Marković (1961–2014)
- Sreten Jocić (born 1962)
- Zvezdan Jovanović (born 1965), assassinated Serbian PM Zoran Đinđić
- Dušan Spasojević (1968–2003)
- Kristijan Golubović (born 1969), organized crime
- Sretko Kalinić (born 1974)
- Mijailo Mijailović (born 1978), Swedish, assassin of Swedish Foreign Minister Anna Lindh

== Sources ==
- Ćirković, Sima (2004). The Serbs. Malden: Blackwell Publishing. ISBN 9781405142915. Archived from the original on 11 March 2025.
- Cox, John K. (2002). The History of Serbia. Westport, Connecticut: Greenwood Press. ISBN 9780313312908.
- Finkel, Caroline (2012). Osman's dream: the story of the Ottoman Empire, 1300–1923. Basic Books. ISBN 9780465008506.
- İnal, Günseli; Arşivi, Semiramis (2005). Semiramis: Sultan'ın gözünden şenlik. YKY. ISBN 978-975-08-0928-6.
- Meram, Ali Kemal (1977). Padişah anaları: resimli belgesel tarih romanı (in Turkish). Öz Yayınları.
- Pavlowitch, Stevan K. (2002). Serbia: The History behind the Name. London: Hurst & Company. ISBN 9781850654773. Archived from the original on 11 March 2025.
- Radojević, Mira; Dimić, Ljubodrag (2014). Serbia in the Great War 1914–1918: A short History. Belgrade: Srpska književna zadruga, Belgrade forum for the world of equals.
- Stavrides, Théoharis (2001). The Sultan of Vezirs: The Life and Times of the Ottoman Grand Vezir Mahmud Pasha Angelovic (1453–1474). Brill. ISBN 978-90-04-12106-5.
