= Tom Strala =

Swiss artist, designer and architect

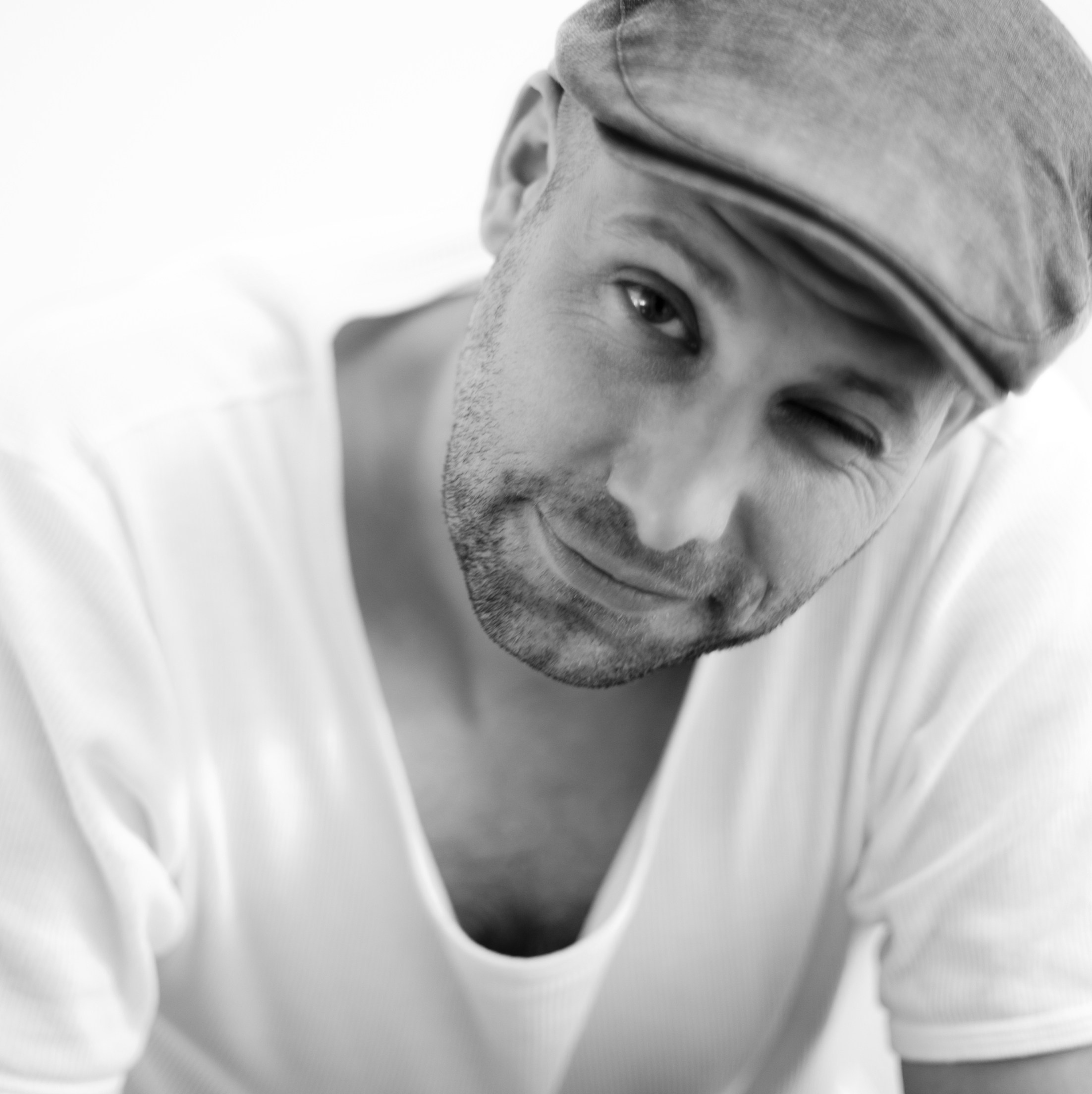
- Born: 1 April 1974 (age 52); Schaffhausen, Switzerland
- Occupations: Architect, designer, artist

Tom Strala (born 1 April 1974) is a Swiss architect, designer and artist, known for his raw furniture and lighting designs. In 2005, Strala was awarded 2nd place of the European Luminary of the Year for the TMS 360 Series, a honeycomb structured light shade. His work is included in several exhibitions in museums and universities. Strala is known as design pioneer in marrying art and design.

== Life and career ==
Strala was born as Thomas Michael Schmid in Schaffhausen, Switzerland on April 1, 1974. He received his Master of Architecture degree in 2001 from the Swiss Federal Institute of Technology (ETHZ) in Zurich, Switzerland and was granted a scholarship for excellence from the Erich Degen Foundation for his master thesis.

Strala was the jury president for the first Innovation and Design Award (ida) in Zurich, Switzerland in 2007 and was a jury member for the Zepter International Design Award in 2013.

== Selected design work ==
Strala avoids industrial and mass production. He designs furniture as an object of utility that does not have to act like a consumer good.

- Chaos (2016), steel standing lamp, powder coated

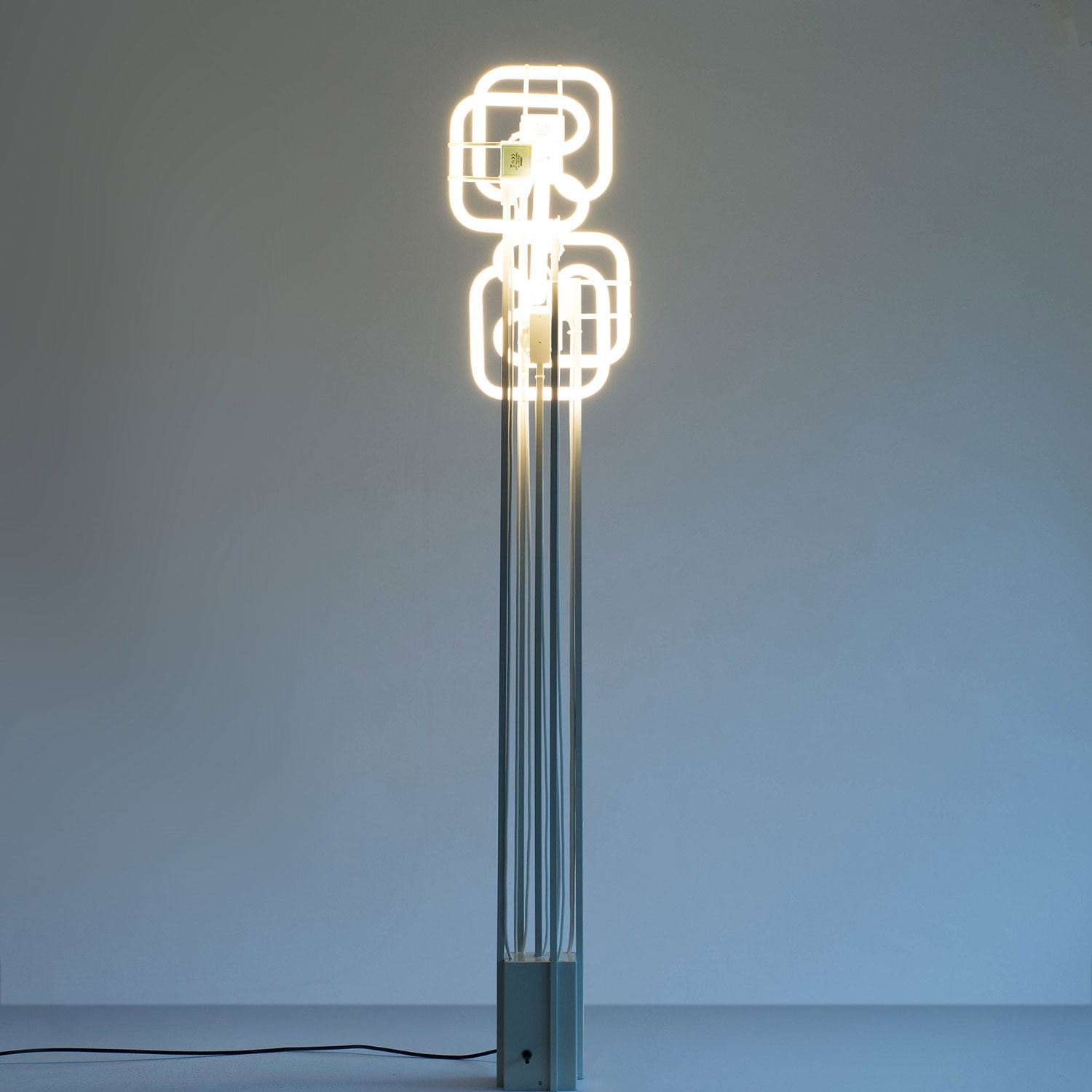
Tom Strala chaos standing lamp

- Animal Farm NO. 2 (2011–2015), brass and concrete standing lamp
- Animal Farm NO. 1 (2011–2014), brass wall lamp
- Lazy Seefelder (2013), chaise longue, nature rattan, chrome steel
- Rocking Seefelder (2011–2013), rocking chair, nature rattan, chrome steel
- Seefelder (2011–2013), nature rattan chair, chrome steel
- Schweini die Origamisau (2012), copper object
- Ponte (2012), oak table, white glass
- Calmares 1 & 2 (2010), aluminum ceiling lamp, white coated
- Comic 1 & 2 (2009), concrete standing lamp, epoxy
- Pompidu 2 (2008), aluminum standing lamp, black coated
- Pompidu 1 (2008), aluminum wall lamp, black coated
- Bartok (2007), concrete, armouring steel table

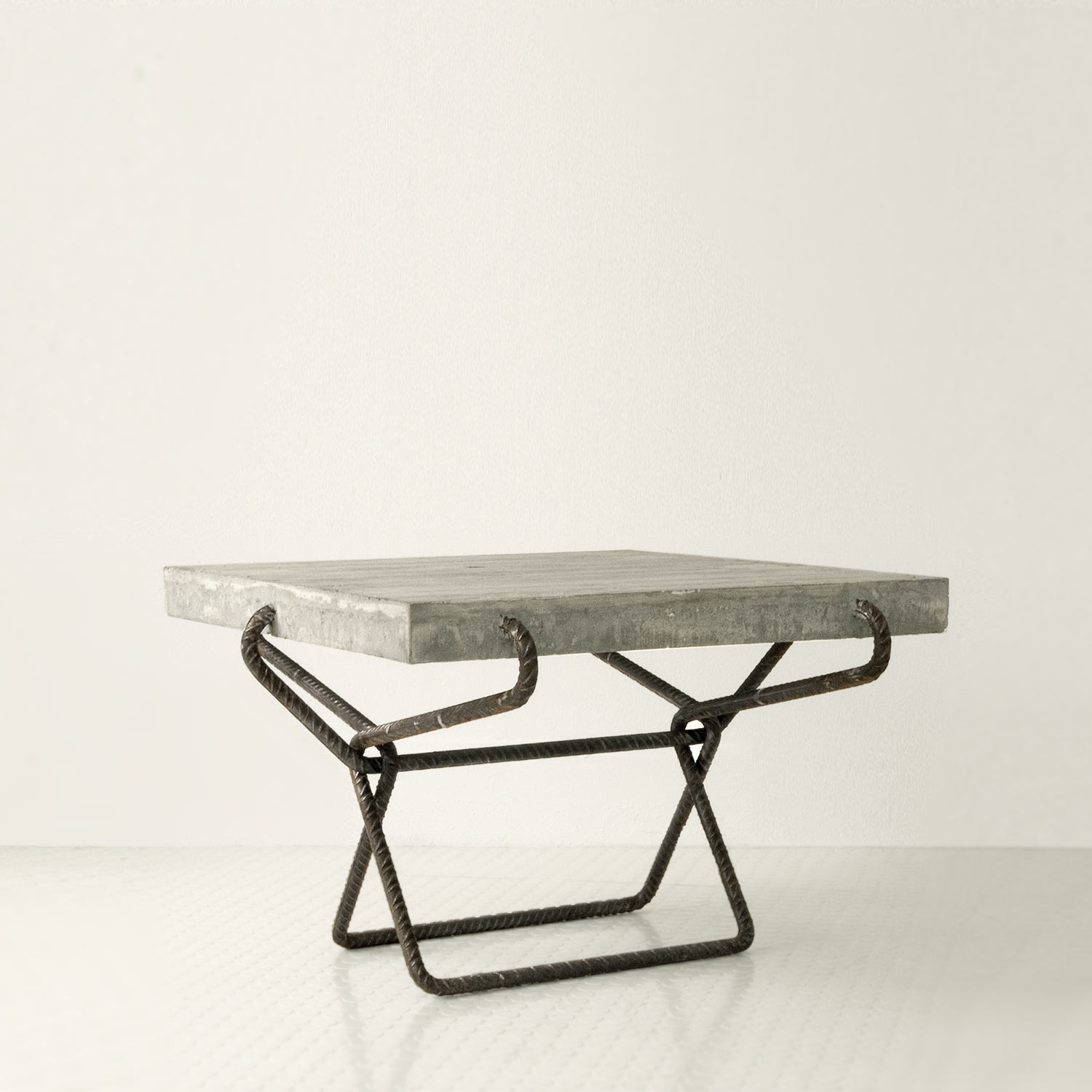
Tom Strala bartok table

- Nelumbo (2007), plexiglas wall lamp, satined
- Strala Table (2006), brown oak oiled table
- Kalahario (2005), aluminum chair, black coated, leather
- Kalahari (2005), steel chair, black coated, gas spring, leather
- INCH (2005), steel standing lamp, black coated
- Kalahock (2005), stool, ottoman, aluminium black coated, leather
- TMS 360S (2001–2004), chrome steel standing lamp, white coated, browned steel
- TMS 90 (2001–2004), chrome steel corner lamp, white coated
- TMS 360K (2001–2004), chrome steel ceiling lamp, white coated

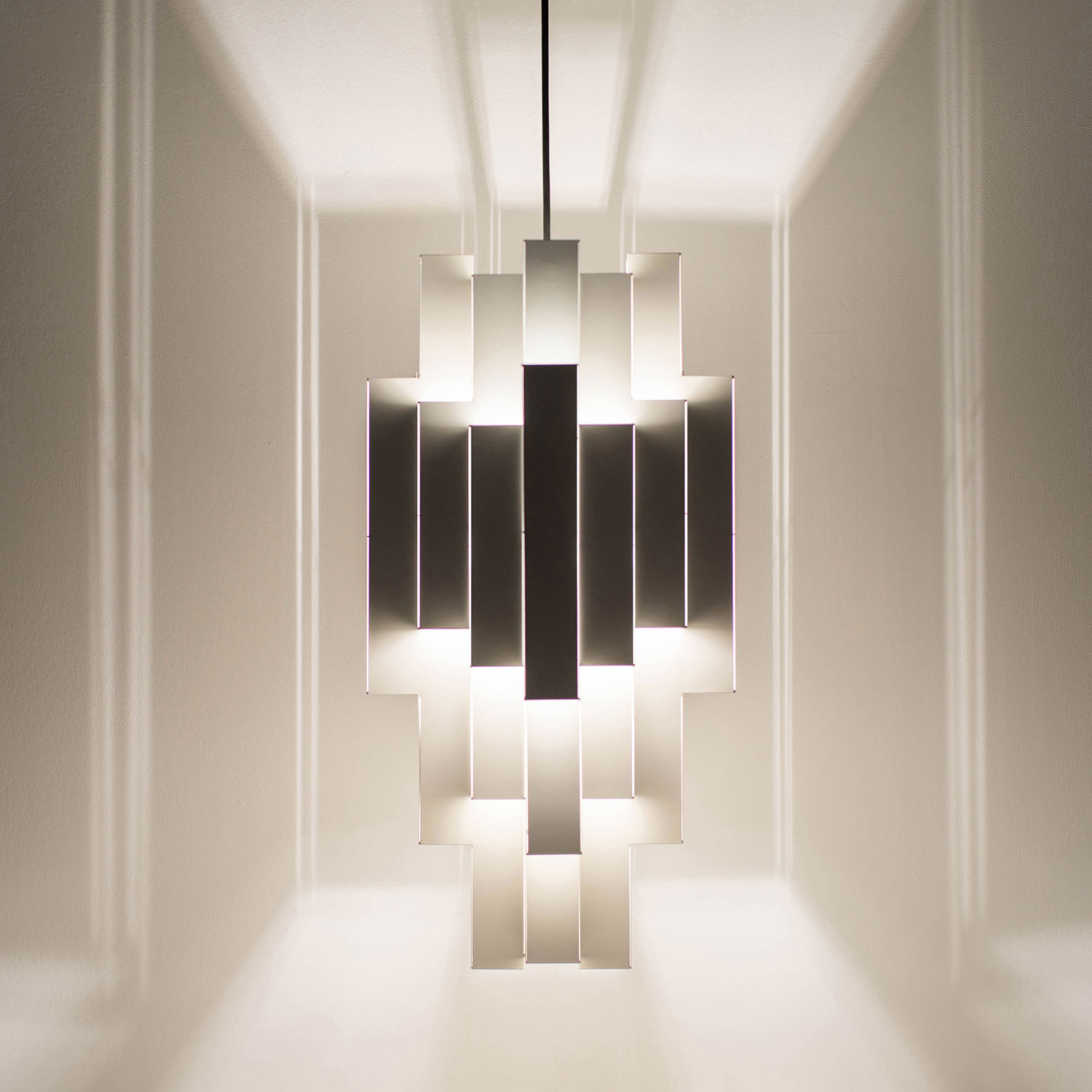
Tom Strala TMS 360k lamp

- TMS 180 (2001–2004), chrome steel wall lamp, white coated
- TMS 360G (2001–2004), chrome steel ceiling lamp, white coated

== Selected exhibitions ==
- 2023 Solo exhibition by Tom Strala at Bayt Sayyid Nadir bin Faisal, Muscat, Oman
- 2023 Swiss Non-Conformist Design, National Museum of Oman, Muscat, Oman
- 2016 Radicality of Banality, Exhibition Galerie P!, Pierre Jeanneret vs Tom Strala, Zürich
- 2015 London Design Festival, 19th Greekstreet, London, UK
- 2015 BRAND NEW WORLD, Salone del Mobile Milano, Italy
- 2015 Design & Art exhibition, FOG, San Francisco, USA
- 2014 Exhibition Art Basel / Design Miami, USA
- 2014 Curated exhibition Dizajn-Park, Belgrad Serbien
- 2014 Solo exhibition, Instituto Svizzero di Milano, Italy
- 2014 Design & Art exhibition, FOG, San Francisco, USA
- Since 2013 Design exhibition, The New Black, San Francisco – Design Gallery
- 2011 Design exhibition, ICFF, New York City
- 2002 Group exhibition, Landschaftsarchitekturausstellung, Hamburg, Germany
- 2002 Group exhibition, Architekturfoyer ETH, Zurich, Switzerland

== Talks ==
- 2016 Bridging Culture at the HSG Alumni Conference in Davos, Switzerland
- 2016 Workshop & talk at FHNW (Fachhochschule Nord-westschweiz), Basel, Switzerland
- 2014 Miami Ironside: Materialized Intelligence at Art Basel / Design Miami, USA
- 2014 The Leading Creative Minds of the 21st Century with Massimilian Fuksas, Idis Turato and Christian Kerez at Belgrade Design Week in Belgrade, Serbia
- 2013 Guest lecturer at the California College of the Arts, CCA, San Francisco, USA

== Awards and recognition ==
- 2015 Yatzer: Best of Milano Design Week for Bartok and Frankenstein Chair
- 2013 AD Choice – architectural digest, best of architecture and interiors: selected as one of the best 500 furnitures
- 2005 Award European Luminary of the Year for the TMS 360 S (2nd place)
- 2001 Award Erich Degen Foundation
