= Jovan Jelovac =

Serbian brand consultant

Jovan Jelovac (Serbian Cyrillic: Јован Јеловац) brand consultant based in Belgrade, Zürich and London. He is known for being the founder and director of Belgrade Design Week, a festival held yearly in Belgrade, Serbia. It is the largest event of its kind in the Balkans, attracting international designers, artists and entrepreneurs such as Bjarke Ingels, Karim Rashid and Patricia Urquiola.

Jelovac established Belgrade Design Week in 2005, after being inspired by the popularity of a London Design Festival. Since 2009, his business partner and wife Vesna Jelovac is Chief Executive Officer of the design conference. The goal of the summit is to share and learn about global trends in the creative fields. During the rest of the year, the organization claims to promotes local designers and design initiatives, such as a children's playground for the town of Belgrade and Kragujevac.

Prior to Belgrade Design Week, Jelovac worked as a brand consultant for Imperial Tobacco UK, Hoffmann LaRoche, Inteko. After a meeting with Wally Olins in London, England, the author included one of Jelovac's projects in his seminal book "On Brand." Since the inception of Belgrade Design Week, Jelovac has had other projects. At Art Basel 2015, Jelovac moderated a panel involving a discussion about trend forecasting. In 2014, he participated in a public forum at the University of Tasmania, regarding the economic viability of culture work.

In 2017, Jelovac founded the gallery boutique "Brand New World Salon" in Zürich, Switzerland with his Belgrade-born wife. It specializes in design objects from around the world. In 2015, the boutique curated an exhibition BRAND NEW WORLD AT DUSAN for the Fuorisalone design event in Milan, Italy.

Through his design project, Jelovac has contributed to the revitalization of Belgrade after years of sanctions and war, "We're experiencing a push of design spirit, the talent reawakening from a long slumber." He would like Belgrade to become a regional creative hub. He also feels that the city needs to remember its Bauhaus past, "We need to reconnect with the modernist, and more minimalist, style that was prevalent here in the 1890s."
