= Ante Tomić =

Ante Tomić may refer to:

- Ante Tomić (writer) (born 1970), Croatian writer
- Ante Tomić (basketball) (born 1987), Croatian basketball player
- Ante Tomić (footballer) (born 1983), Croatian football player
