= Mikser =

Mikser may refer to:

- Sven Mikser (born 1973), Estonian politician
- Mikser Festival, annual exhibition promoting design, architecture, urban planning, new technologies, art, music, and communications in Serbia
