= Maja Vidaković Lalić =

Serbian architect (born 1972)

- Born: Maja Vidaković; April 30, 1972 (age 53); Smederevo, Serbia, Yugoslavia
- Occupation: Architect
- Known for: Revitalizing Belgrade's urban neighborhoods, promoting creative culture and civic engagement
- Notable work: Mikser Festival, Mikser House, Miksalište Refugee Center
- Spouse: Ivan Lalić
- Children: 2
- Relatives: Siniša Jakovljević (brother, deceased)
- Website: http://festival.mikser.rs

Maja Vidaković Lalić (Serbian Cyrillic: Маја Лалић; born April 30, 1972) is a Serbian architect, urbanist, and cultural activist, founder and creative director of Belgrade's Mikser Festival, which was launched in 2006. She has been described by The New York Times as Belgrade's "...most cutting-edge homegrown architect".

== Background ==
Born Maja Vidaković in Smederevo, Lalić studied architecture at the University of Belgrade. She obtained her master's degree in architecture and urban design from Columbia University.

Lalić's father is from Serbia, and her mother is from Mostar, Bosnia and Herzegovina. She is married to playwright Ivan Lalić and they have two children together, a daughter and a son.

== Career ==
From 1999 to 2002, Lalić lived and worked in New York City. She was employed by the Kramer Design Group, managing clients such as Donna Karan, Escada, and Earl Jeans.

Through Columbia University, she also contributed to revitalizing urban neighborhoods in New York City, Brussels, and Prague. She emphasizes participatory urban planning, sustainable city design, and community-driven revitalization.

Upon her return to Serbia in 2002, she co-founded the Mikser network, which later evolved into an umbrella organization through which she launched many projects. Her first major initiative involved a 2003 conference in Belgrade with Rem Koolhaas as the keynote speaker.

In 2006, Lalić founded the Mikser Festival, an annual exhibition promoting design, architecture, urban planning, new technologies, art, music, and communications in Serbia. The festival invites international and local experts from various fields and features lectures, competitions, workshops, exhibits, concerts, films, and theater plays.

The Mikser umbrella organization includes Mikser House, reMiks Studio, Mikser TV, Miksalište Refugee Center, Mikser Café, and the Balkan Design store. In 2008, through reMiks Studio, Lalić coordinated Karim Rashid's visit to Belgrade and designed the Majik Café. She also headed renovations for Telekom and Telenor flagship stores and the Beolab Laboratory. Her first concept store, Supermarket (opened 2009), combined retail, spa, restaurant, and hair salon under Brutalist-inspired design.

In August 2015, she co-founded Miksalište Refugee Center, which assisted over 100,000 migrants passing through Serbia. Lalić has promoted young Serbian designers internationally, including at the Milan Furniture Fair. She co-founded a branch of Mikser House in Sarajevo with her husband.

She is a signatory of the Declaration on the Common Language of the Croats, Serbs, Bosniaks and Montenegrins.

Lalić has also been recognized for her civic engagement, mentorship of young designers, and advocacy for gender equality in architecture and urban planning. She has publicly commented on urban policy and governance in Serbia, emphasizing the importance of community participation and legal accountability.

== Awards and Distinctions ==
Lalić has received numerous awards, including:

- European Citizenship Award (2016)
- Lucille Smyser Lowenfish Memorial Prize (Columbia University)
- Kinne Fellows Memorial Prize (Columbia University)
- European Movement Award
- Fulbright Prize for her work with Miksalište Refugee Center
- BIG SEE Visionary Award 2019 for contributions to regional design and creative culture
- Inspiring Girls International Award 2024 (Volunteer of the Year)

These awards recognize her leadership in architecture, urban design, creative culture, and humanitarian efforts.
