= Belgrade Design Week =

- Genre: Lectures, Design labs, Competitions
- Frequency: Annually
- Locations: Belgrade, Serbia
- Founder: Jovan Jelovac
- Participants: International artists, designers, and entrepreneurs
- Website: http://www.belgradedesignweek.com

Belgrade Design Week is a one-week design festival held once a year in Belgrade, Serbia. First held in 2005, the festival is organized every spring and is the largest design initiative in South-Eastern Europe. The festival covers architecture, design, fashion, publishing, and new media, as well as related fields like communications, marketing, advertising, and arts management. The event includes design labs, competitions, and presentations from international speakers like Karim Rashid and Daniel Libeskind.

During the rest of the year, there are related projects such as promoting local designers, holding a branding competition for the Serbian Center for the Promotion of Science, and participating in the Partners of the Human Cities/ Project. The organization also spearheaded the Belgrade 2020 project, promoting the city as a candidate for the European Capital of Culture.

== History ==
First held in 2005, the Belgrade Design Week festival was founded by architect and brand consultant Jovan Jelovac. The conference costs about half a million euros to produce and is funded mostly through commercial and media sponsorships. The reasons for creating the event were for education and inspiring the country's citizens through design. In 2014, the president of Serbia, Tomislav Nikolić, was the patron for the event, and mentioned how design can contribute to the country's economy.

In 2006, designer Karim Rashid was the ambassador for the second Belgrade Design Week and spoke at the conference. Subsequently, he headed several design projects in Serbia's capital city. Rashid stated that he is fascinated by Belgrade and Eastern Europe in general, seeing it "as the next upcoming place - everyone is psyched and enthusiastic about the rebuilding of these poetic, romantic, artistic, and very intellectual places."

After attending the design festival in 2008, architect Daniel Libeskind was awarded a billion dollar contract to redevelop the Belgrade waterfront.

== Festival events ==
The principal site of the festival changes annually with various run-down or abandoned buildings being renovated for the event. Past locations have included a palace, the bombed-out hotel Jugoslavija, an abandoned department store, the closed contemporary art museum, and an old factory. Every year, the conference also focuses on a common thread, for example, in 2013 the theme was the square shape.

Approximately thirty international speakers present each year and cover a wide range of subjects. Designers and artists who have spoken at the event include Konstantin Grcic, Aylin Langreuter, Christophe de la Fontaine, Hella Jongerius, Daan Roosegaarde, Ross Lovegrove, Christophe Pillet, Sacha Lakic, and Patricia Urquiola.

The events at the festival include presentations, workshops, design competitions and exhibits from designers (such as Israeli Eilon Armon and Swiss architect duo Lang/Baumann).

== See also ==
- Belgrade Fashion Week
- The Applied Artists and Designers Association of Serbia
