= Mikser Festival =

Annual architecture exhibition in Serbia

- Genre: Lectures, Exhibitions, Competitions, Concerts, Films
- Frequency: Annually
- Locations: Belgrade, Serbia
- Founder: Maja Vidaković Lalić
- Participants: International and local artists, designers, architects, musicians, and gaming companies
- Attendance: 75,000
- People: Over 1,000 participants
- Website: http://festival.mikser.rs

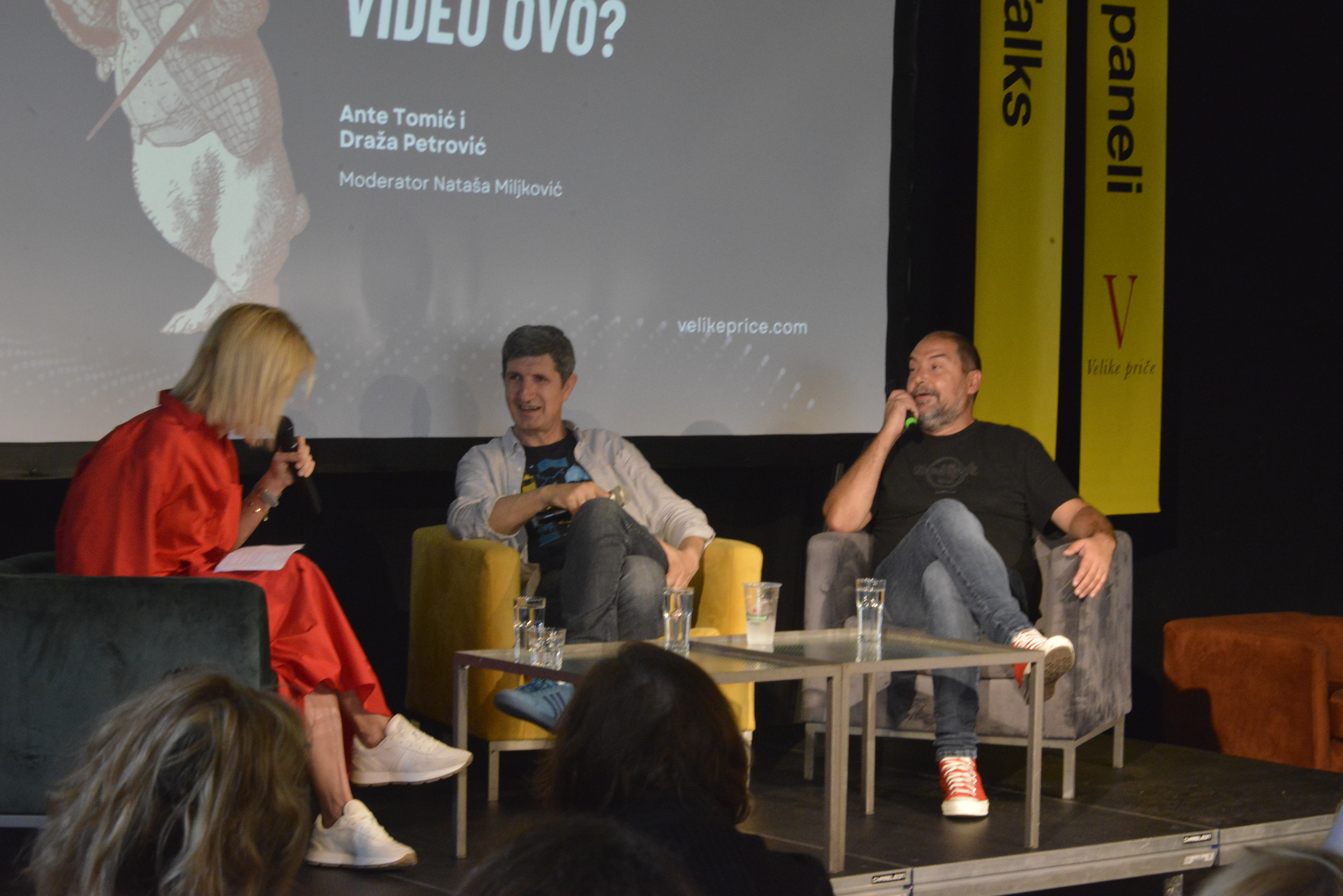
Mikser Festival 2024: Croatian writer Ante Tomić in conversation with Serbian journalist Draža Petrović about their joint column in the daily newspaper Danas. The conversation is conducted by journalist Nataša Miljković

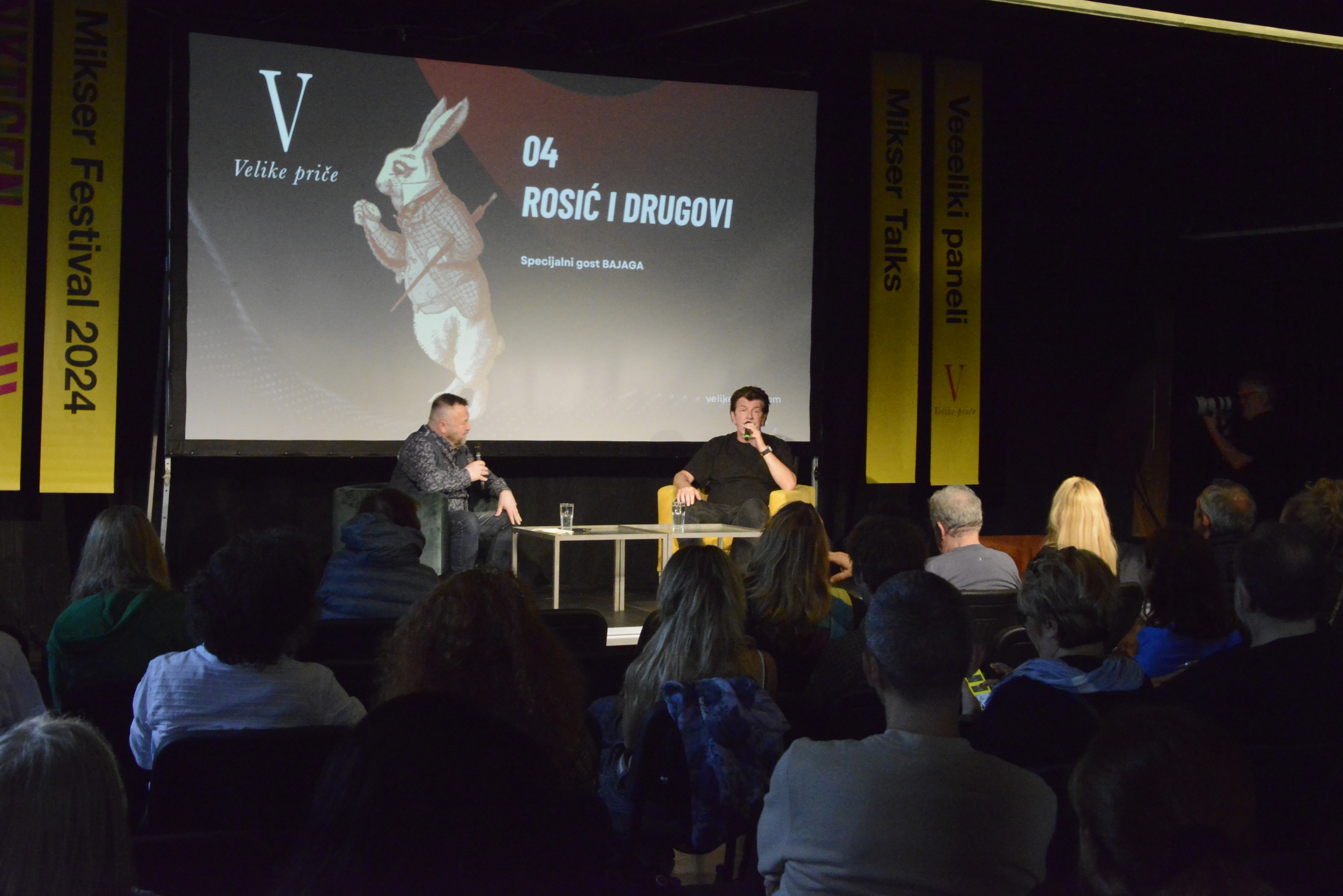
Mikser Festival 2024: journalist and writer Branko Rosić in an interview with the famous Serbian musician Momčilo Bajagić - Bajaga

The Mikser Festival is an annual exhibition promoting design, architecture, urban planning, new technologies, art, music, and communications in Serbia. It was founded in 2006 by architect Maja Vidaković Lalić. The festival invites international and local experts from creative industries. It features lectures, competitions, workshops, exhibits, concerts, films, and theater plays.

The festival occurs once a year in Belgrade at the end of May or the beginning of June and usually lasts 4 to 7 days. The first one was held at the "Žitomlin" silo in the Dorćol area of Belgrade. Subsequently, it was held in Belgrade's once-derelict industrial zone of Savamala to help revitalize that area before returning to Dorćol in 2017.

Its attendance grew from 40,000 in 2010 to 75,000 in 2017.

The festival is part of the Mikser umbrella organization, which includes the Mikser House, a gallery and cultural space in the Savamala neighborhood. The group also operates reMiks Studio, Mikser TV, the Mikser Organization, the Miksalište Refugee Center, the Mikser Café, and the Balkan Design store.

The Mikser Festival sometimes collaborates with other events. In 2006, its Ghost Project exhibit appeared at Belgrade Design Week. The multimedia installation initially focused on local unrealized projects in industrial design, and since 2011, it has evolved into a competition for international designers.

== Highlights ==
The main theme of the 2011 festival was the promotion of workshops, new technologies, and experimentation, as well as commemorating the 20-year anniversary of the break-up of Yugoslavia. Musicians who were popular before the break-up were invited to perform. Notable appearances included Greg Wilson, John Tejada, JD Twitch, and JG Wilkes from the British club scene. In 2011, Lalić launched The Young Balkan Designers competition as part of the Mikser Festival. The competition targeted local industrial designers, and the first edition was judged by designer Konstantin Grcic and Maja Vidaković Lalić. Winners had their work showcased at design events like the Milan Furniture Fair and Vienna Design Week.

In 2014, the Mikser Festival shifted its focus to the Savamala neighborhood, aiming to continue its revitalization efforts. Forty urban planners from around the world were invited to discuss possibilities for renewal. Austrian choreographer William Dorner performed a dance recital with the goal of inspiring local residents to protect their city. Three Swiss artists exhibited a multimedia installation featuring video footage of Savamala and other urban neighborhoods. Additionally, a conference and workshops were held with Dutch designer Renne Ramakers and British architect Jeremy Till in attendance.

The 2017 festival focused on themes of migration, education on the move, the city, and the making of culture. These topics were addressed through design, visual arts, cinema, music, and the lecture series "Mikser Talks". Around 50 local and international experts spoke about city planning, architecture, design, social sciences, information technologies, and communications. Representatives from the Imperial College in London gave a presentation on sustainable urban planning. The festival also hosted a bazaar with homemade clothes and food stands, and invited the gaming company Nordeus, which organized workshops for Serbian youth. Concerts featured musicians Aleksandar Sedlar Bogoev, Marko Luis, and the Lola Klasik String Orchestra, among others. A new addition in 2017 was a creative camp aimed at solving social problems through technology.

In 2024, the Mikser Festival was held from May 23-25 in Belgrade. The main theme for the 2024 edition was "No Middle Ground". The festival, in collaboration with Monolog Gallery and the Faculty of Applied Arts in Belgrade, invited young artists worldwide to participate in the "Black Box" exhibition. Nearly 80 submissions from 14 countries were received, and the selected artworks were showcased in an immersive multimedia installation. The jury for the "Black Box" competition included prominent international artists and curators such as Denis Leo Hegić, Marko Lađušić, Asena Hayal, Nikola Damjanov, Sara Jaafar, Dunja Trutin, and Predrag Todorović.

Additionally, the 2024 festival featured the "Ghost Project" design competition with the theme "Microcosm". This competition encouraged young product designers to explore small-scale interventions and innovations that could transform our environments.

== See also ==
- Belgrade Design Week
- Maja Vidaković Lalić
