= Nataša Miljković =

Serbian television presenter and journalist (born 1977)

- Наташа Миљковић
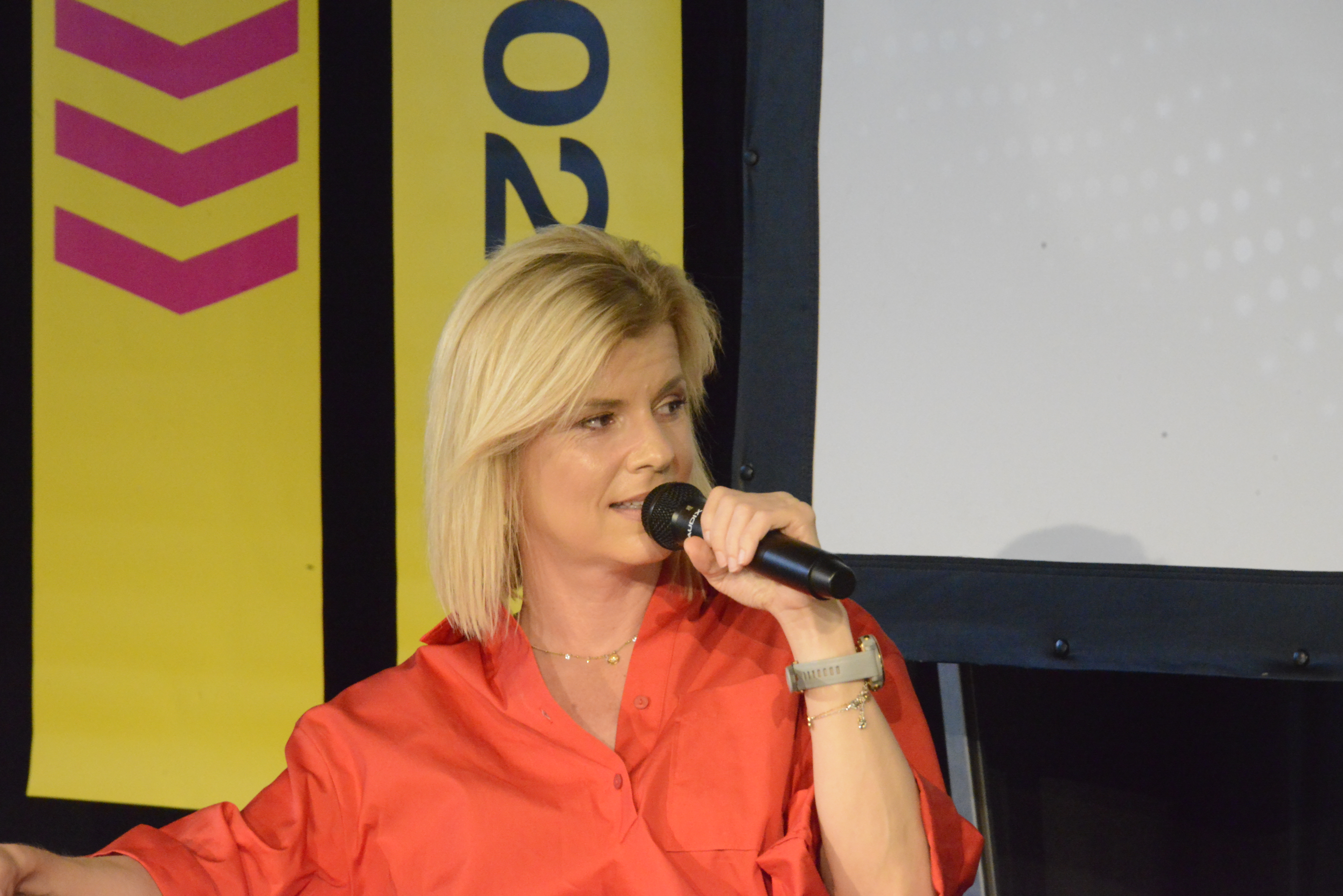
- Nataša Miljković in 2024
- Born: 25 January 1977 (age 49); Belgrade, SR Serbia, SFR Yugoslavia
- Education: Faculty of Political Sciences
- Alma mater: University of Belgrade
- Occupations: Television presenter, journalist
- Years active: 1991–present
- Employer: N1 (2020–present)
- Television: Studio B, BK, RTS, Prva, Nova S, N1
- Spouse: Srđan Timarov (divorced)
- Partner: Žarko Tarić
- Children: 1
- Parents: Miloš Miljković (father); Biljana Baštovanović (mother)
- Website: N1 Profile

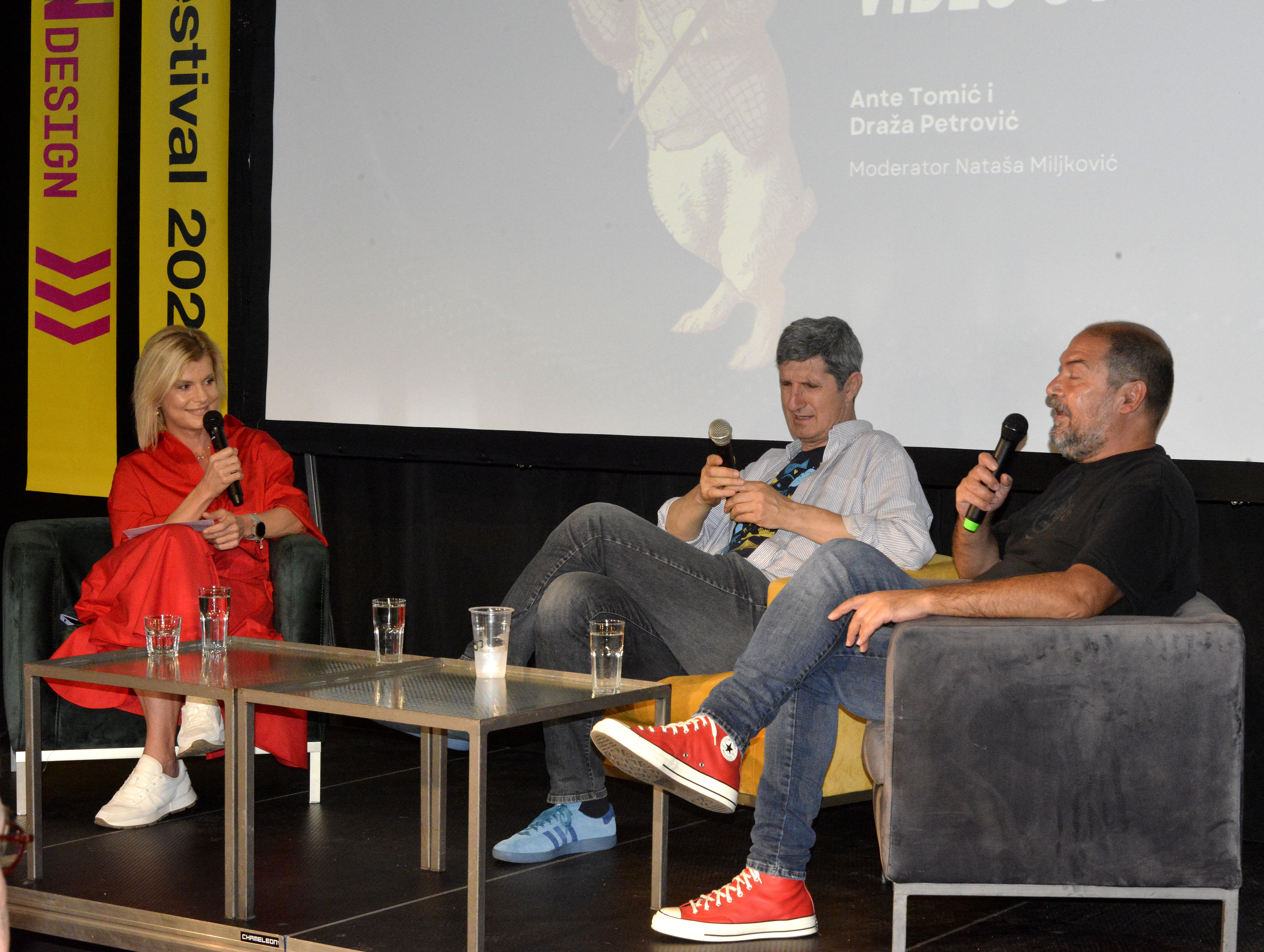
Ante Tomić and Draža Petrović at the Mikser Festival in 2024. The discussion on the topic of their joint column in the daily newspaper Danas is hosted by Nataša Miljković

Nataša Miljković (Serbian Cyrillic: Наташа Миљковић; born 25 January 1977) is a Serbian television presenter and journalist.

== Biography ==
Nataša Miljković was born in 1977 in Belgrade. Her father Miloš Miljković was a journalist for Večernje novosti, and her mother Biljana (née Baštovanović) was a social worker at the Central Prison in Belgrade. She finished elementary and high school in Belgrade. She began her journalistic career at the age of 14 at Studio B, where she worked on the then popular show "Teenage TV". At the age of 19, she moved to BK.

She was married to actor Srđan Timarov, with whom she has a son, Lazar.

== Career ==
She graduated in international relations from the Faculty of Political Sciences at the University of Belgrade. At the age of 26, she received her master's degree at the Sapienza University of Rome on the topic "The Politics of Power in International Relations".

From 1996 to 1999, she hosted the shows Gutenberg and Ukrštene reči on BK, and then gained professional experience in the independent production company VIN, where her editor was Gordana Suša. Upon her return to BK, she hosted and edited the show Maska nedelje.

After the closure of BK, Nataša moved to RTS, where she edited and hosted the popular TV show Ključ. After this famous show, she edited and hosted the RTS Morning Program for almost 5 years together with her colleague Maja Nikolić. Slavko Beleslin, Nataša and Maja hosted the show Studio 3 on RTS in 2014 and 2015. After the show was canceled, she hosted and edited the show Tako stoje stvari with Zoran Stanojević and Sanja Dragičević-Babić.

In 2018, after 15 years spent on this television, she left RTS and moved to Prva, where she first hosted the summer editions, and for the next year hosted and edited the show "Morning with Nataša".

In August 2019, she moved to Nova S, where she edited and hosted the show Među nama with her colleague Maja Nikolić, the first daily show to be broadcast live on that channel.

In April 2020, she moved to N1, where she hosted the morning program Novi dan. Since 19 April 2021, she has hosted and edited the author's show “Persona non grata” on N1.
