= Aylin Langreuter =

German artist

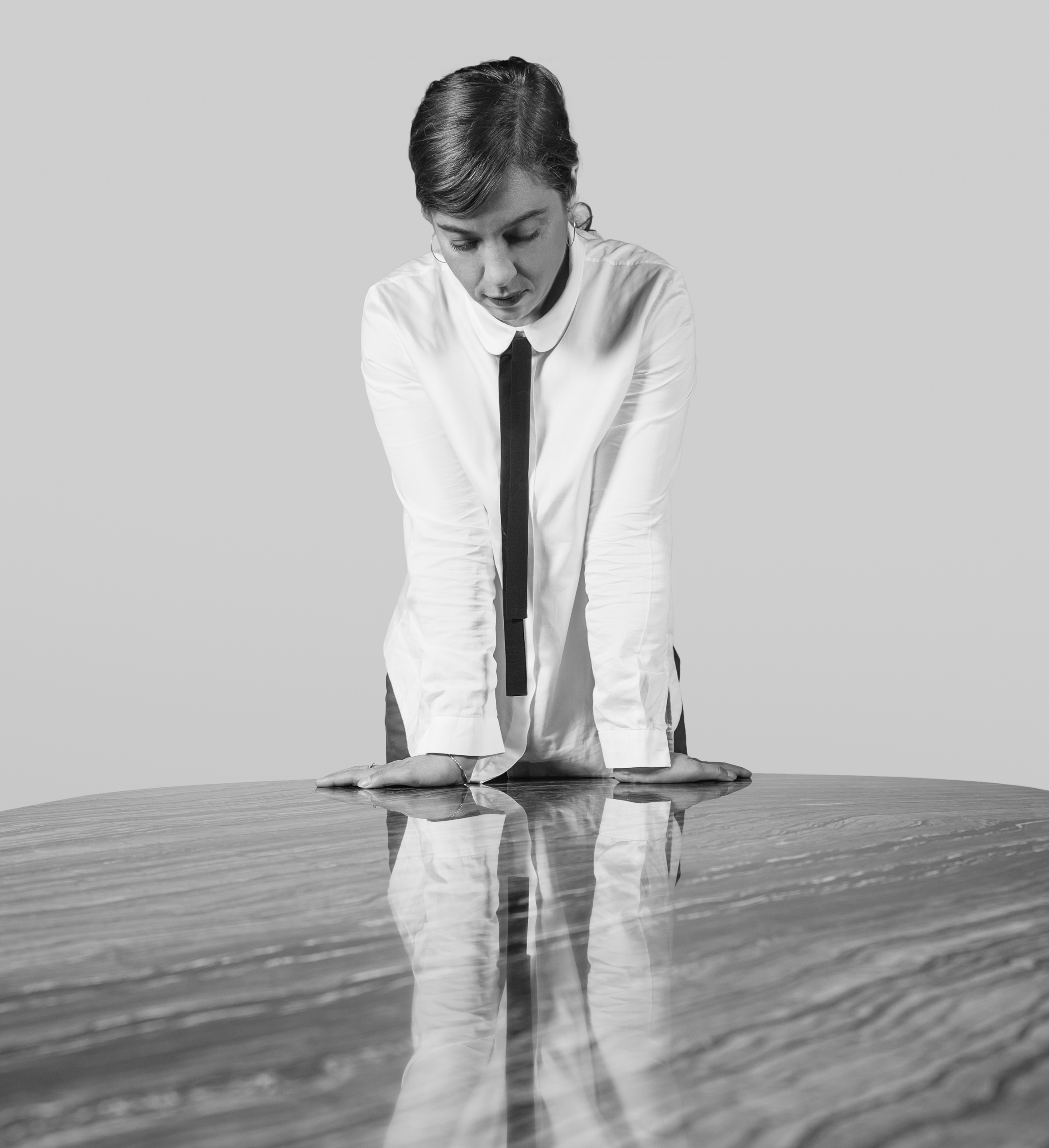
- Aylin Langreuter in 2018
- Born: 1976 (age 49–50); Munich, Germany
- Style: Conceptual art, Appropriation art
- Website: langreuter.com

Aylin Langreuter is a contemporary concept and appropriation artist, and a university professor from Munich, Germany.

== Life and work ==
Aylin Langreuter was born in 1976 in Munich, Germany. She studied at the Academy of Fine Arts Munich, class of Gerd Winner, graduating in 2001, when she also cofounded Wahnsinn und Methode GmbH. With the support of "Stiftung Kulturfonds" government scholarship she published her first catalog, "Erster Teil" (Eng. Part One) in 2005. Same year she applied the philosophy studies, which will later influence her art in the following years. Her work has appeared mostly, but not only, in the solo exhibitions in the Galerie Wittenbrink, Munich. She has cofounded Dante – Goods and Bads in 2012 with her partner, industrial designer, Christophe de la Fontaine. In 2018 Aylin Langreuter and Christophe de la Fontaine have been appointed professors of Industrial Design at State Academy of Fine Arts Stuttgart.

== Style and philosophy ==
In her works, Aylin Langreuter has a philosophical-aesthetic approach, playing with semantic shifts between form and content. She is not treating her objects in the usual self-made, rough, unwelcoming way – she has a relationship of the best possible care which defines the initial situation, unfolding a network of possible meanings.

Her work explored themes related to applied and fine arts, object design, and abstraction. She experimented with form, function, and spatial relationships through minimal modifications to everyday objects.

The observer's challenge would be the translation: she considers that only the context of Art, the undemanding, unencumbered space of an exhibition, facilitates the chance of a change of perspective, where in the function-free environment, the gaze meets the object in a way that gives it another life – or even: a life.

Each of her objects presentation is an integral part of the work itself. To achieve this she sometimes "borrows" from others. She sometimes uses quotations, text fragments, photographs, the peculiarity of a given space, light, and graphic elements. It is sometimes this interdisciplinary interaction itself what creates the context that makes the piece work. In a world whose language you don't understand, you have to use whatever you have to make yourself understood.

== Publications ==
- damit bin ich gemeint (2002), Wahnsinn und Methode GmbH, Munich
- Erster Teil (2004). Blumenbar Verlag, Munich ISBN 9783936738063
- Function Follows Fairytale (2010). with text from Andreas Neumeister, Blumenbar Verlag, Munich, 2010 ISBN 978-3936738735
- 1861 / 2011 / 2081 (2011). Jovis Verlag, Berlin, ISBN 9783868591866
- Folklore Aktuell (2018). Harpune Verlag, Vienna ISBN 978-3-902835-54-3
