= Ante Tomić (writer) =

Croatian writer and journalist

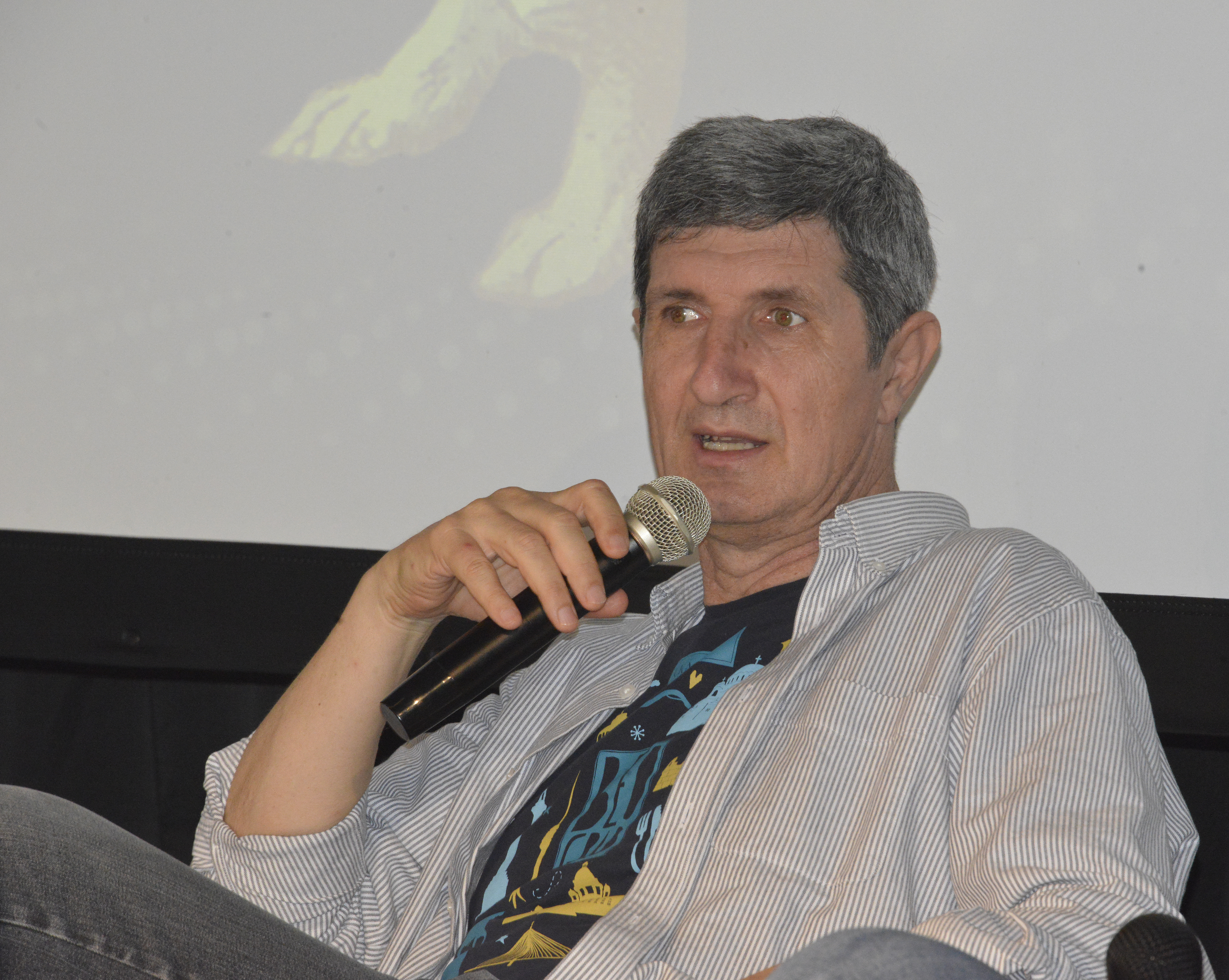
- Tomić in 2024
- Born: April 22, 1970 (age 56); Split, SR Croatia, Yugoslavia
- Other name: Ante Tomic
- Education: University of Zadar
- Occupations: Writer; Journalist
- Years active: 1988–present

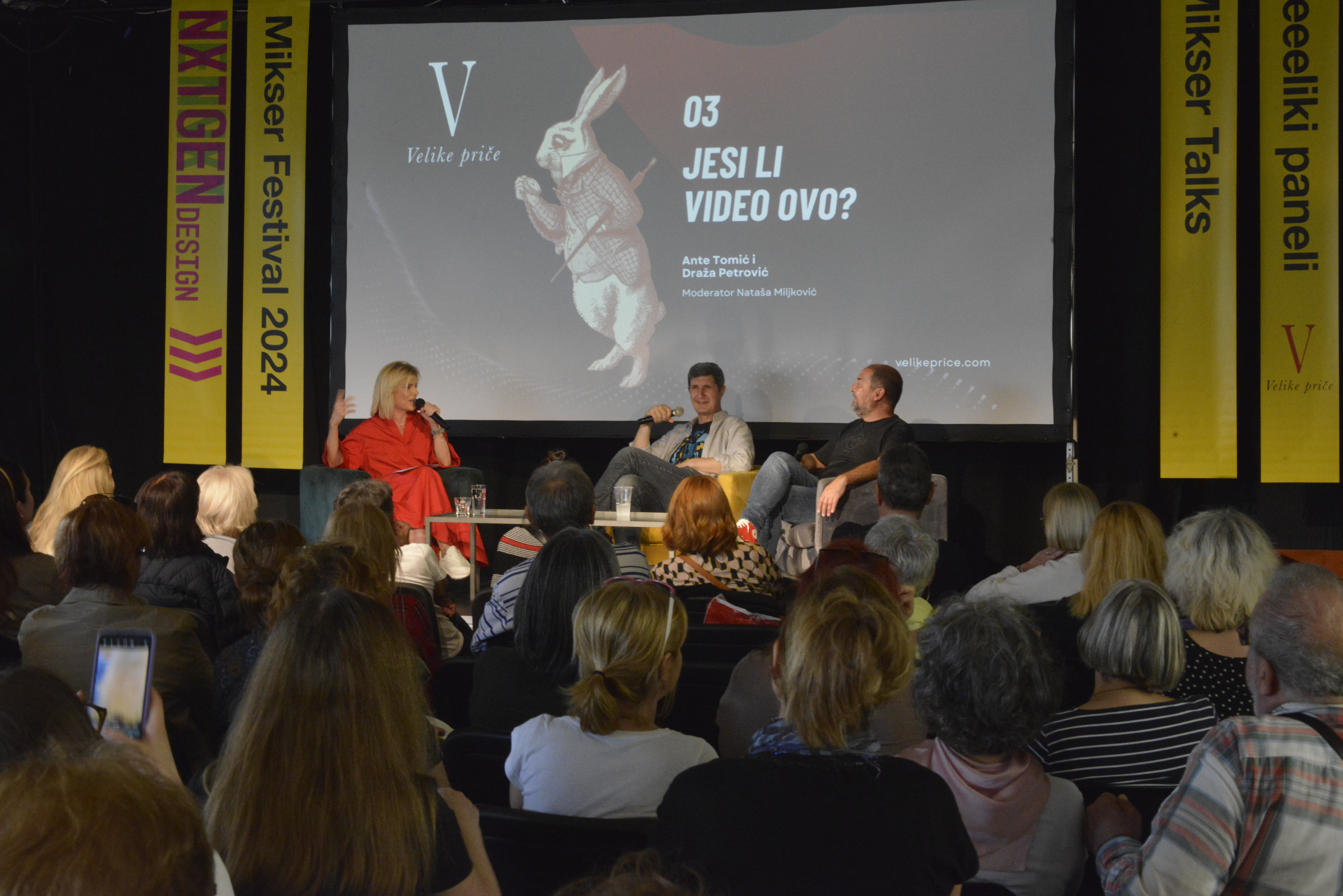
Ante Tomić in an interview with Serbian journalists Nataša Miljković and Draža Petrović at Mikser Festival 2024

Ante Tomić (born April 22, 1970) is a Croatian writer and journalist.

== Biography ==
He finished elementary school in the village of Proložac near Imotski, where he lived until he was fourteen. After that, he was a cadet at a Yugoslav People's Army high school in Zagreb. He completed his studies in philosophy and sociology at the Faculty of Philosophy in Zadar. As a writer, he first appeared in the newspaper Slobodna Dalmacija, and in 2001 he moved to the newspaper Jutarnji list.

He published his first collection of stories, Zaboravio sam gdje sam parkirao ("I forgot where I parked"), in 1997, and its expanded edition in 2001. His debut novel Što je muškarac bez brkova ("What is a man without a moustache") was published in 2000. The novel was a great success and has had seven editions so far. In 2001, he published a book of feuilletons Smotra folklora. Together with Ivica Ivanišević, he wrote the drama Krovna udruga. Adapted by Aida Bukvić, Zagreb's Croatian National Theater performed Što je muškarac bez brkova. The play won the award for best play at the Marulićevi dani festival in 2002. In 2003, he published the novel Ništa nas ne smije iznenaditi ("Nothing should surprise us"), then in 2004 the book of feuilletons Klasa optimist. The same year, he travelled across the US to provide his newspaper's coverage of the presidential campaign by talking to the American electorate on the street. In 2005 he wrote the novel Ljubav, struja voda i telefon ("Love, Stream, Water and Telephone").

As of 2009, he had his own column Vlaška posla in Slobodna Dalmacija. Tomić won the award of the Croatian Journalists' Association for the best reportage (1996) and column (2005). He left Slobodna Dalmacija in 2016 after the newspaper terminated their contract with fellow journalist Boris Dežulović following a court decision which ordered the newspaper to pay 150,000 HRK in damages for an editorial written by Dežulović.

In 2017, Tomić signed the Declaration on the Common Language of the Croats, Serbs, Bosniaks and Montenegrins.

== Works ==
- Zaboravio sam gdje sam parkirao, collection of stories, 1997.
- Što je muškarac bez brkova, novel, 2000.
- Smotra folklora, 2001.
- Ništa nas ne smije iznenaditi, novel, 2003.
- Veliki šoping, collection of stories, 2004.
- Klasa optimist, 2004.
- Ljubav, struja voda i telefon, novel, 2005.
- Krovna udruga i druga drama (Anđeli pakla), collection of plays, 2005., with Ivica Ivanišević
- Građanin pokorni, 2006.
- Dečko koji obećava, collection of columns, 2009.
- Čudo u Poskokovoj Dragi, novel, 2009.
- Nisam pametan, collection of columns, 2010.
- Klevete i laži, collection of columns, 2011.
- Punoglavci, novel, 2011.
- Veličanstveni Poskokovi, novel, 2015.
- Pogledaj što je mačka donijela, story collection, 2017.

=== Film and television ===
Year	Title	Involvement	Notes
2001	The Last Will	co-writer	
2002	New Age	co-writer	TV miniseries
2005	What Is a Man Without a Moustache?	writer	Film based on Tomić's novel of the same title
2006	The Border Post	writer	Film based on Tomić's novel Ništa nas ne smije iznenaditi
2016	The Constitution	writer	
