= Christophe de la Fontaine =

Luxembourgish product designer and university professor

- Born: 1976 (age 49–50); Luxembourg
- Style: Industrial design
- Website: christophedelafontaine.com

Christophe de la Fontaine is a Luxembourgish product designer, university professor and co-founder of Dante – Goods and Bads GmbH, German-based furniture and home accessory brand. His work includes furniture and lighting in collaboration with Moroso, Rosenthal, FormAgenda and many others.

== Life and work ==
Christophe de la Fontaine was born in 1976 in Luxembourg, where he graduated from the Lycée des Arts et Métiers as a sculptor. He continued his studies at the industrial design department of the State Academy of Fine Arts Stuttgart under the supervision of Richard Sapper. Upon graduation in 2002, he collaborated with Therefore - product design consultant in London, followed by Piero Lissoni Associati in Milan. In this period he also collaborated with Stefan Diez on a project which would win the “Design Report Award” in 2002. In Milan he became the head of Studio Patricia Urquiola design department, remaining on the position until 2010. In 2012 he co-founded Dante - Goods and Bads, a furniture and home accessory brand, together with his partner, contemporary artist Aylin Langreuter. The company is today internationally active and features awarded editions. As an independent product designer, he received numerous international awards, including the Red Dot Design Award, the Good Design Award, and the Gold iF Product Design Award. In 2015 he was featured on The Wallpaper* 100, a list of the 'design world's most powerful players'. Christophe is Rosenthal's most award-winning designer., and his work was endorsed by Luxembourg royalty.

Since 2018 he was appointed professor of industrial design at the State Academy of Fine Arts Stuttgart.

== Exhibitions ==
- 2015 Brand New World, Milan, Italy
- 2012 DANTE - Goods & Bads, Side Glance, Galerie Schweitzer, Luxembourg
- 2011 Prix d’Art Robert Schuman, Cercle Municipal Luxembourg
- 2011 Trophées, Art Paris Grand Palais
- 2010 Artfreaks, Workshop MUDAM Luxembourg
- 2010 Moving Worlds, Triennale Jeune création, Carre Rotondes, Luxembourg
- 2009 Installation permanente Maison Printz e Richard, Chamber of Deputies (Luxembourg)
- 2008 ‘Transfert’ at Kiosk by AICA, Luxembourg
- 2007 Elo. Inner Exile - Outer Limits, MUDAM Luxembourg
- 2005 Anders als immer, Zeitgenössisches Design und die Macht des Gewohnten
- 2004 Promosedia, “Caiazza Memorial Challenge” competition for wooden chairs Udine Italy
- 2003 Spin-off Lounge IMM Cologne, Germany
- 2002 Salone Satellite 02 Milan Furniture Fair, Italy
- 2002 St. Etienne Biennale International 02, France
- 2002‘Wonderwood’ Interieur 02 Kortrjik, Belgium
- 2002 Instant Lounge Interieur 02 Kortrijk, Belgium
- 2002 Instant Lounge for ANNO’02 Kortrijk, Belgium
- 2002 Terminal-nyc during the ICFF NY, US

== Awards and juries ==
- 2013 German Design Award for 'Format' Rosenthal studio-line, Frankfurt
- 2013 Jury IF Award, Hannover
- 2012 IF Gold Award for 'Format' Rosenthal studio-line, Hannover
- 2012 Design Plus Award for 'Format' Rosenthal studio-line, Frankfurt
- 2012 Interior Innovation Award for 'Format' Rosenthal studio-line, Cologne
- 2012 Jury Design Report Award 2012, Milano
- 2011 Good Design Award for 'Format' Rosenthal studio-line, Chicago
- 2004 Promosedia, – winner of the "Caiazza Memorial Challenge" competition for wooden chairs Udine
- 2003 Interior Innovation Award IMM Cologne, winner "best of the best award" for the product "Instant Lounge"
- 2002 Salone Satellite, winner of the "Design Report Award" Milano
