= Karim Rashid =

American industrial designer (born 1960)

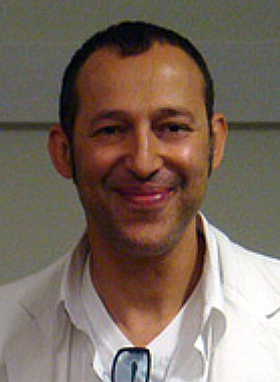
- Rashid in 2007
- Born: September 18, 1960 (age 66); Cairo
- Other name: Prince of Plastic
- Education: Carleton University
- Occupations: Designer, industrial designer
- Relatives: Hani Rashid
- Awards: honorary doctorate; Red Dot Design Award
- Website: karimrashid.com

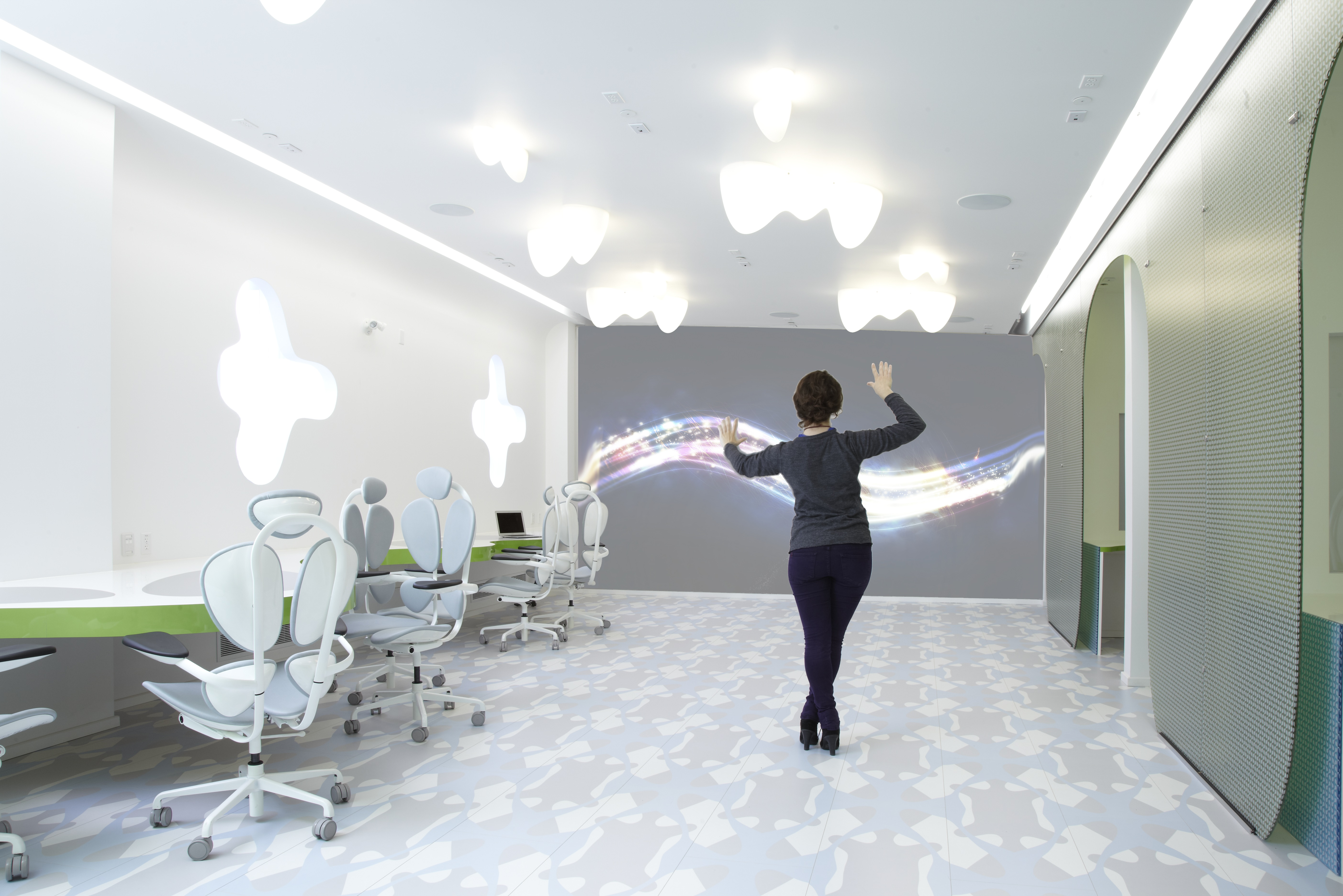
Queen's University's School of Computing Human Media Lab designed by Rashid (early 2000s)

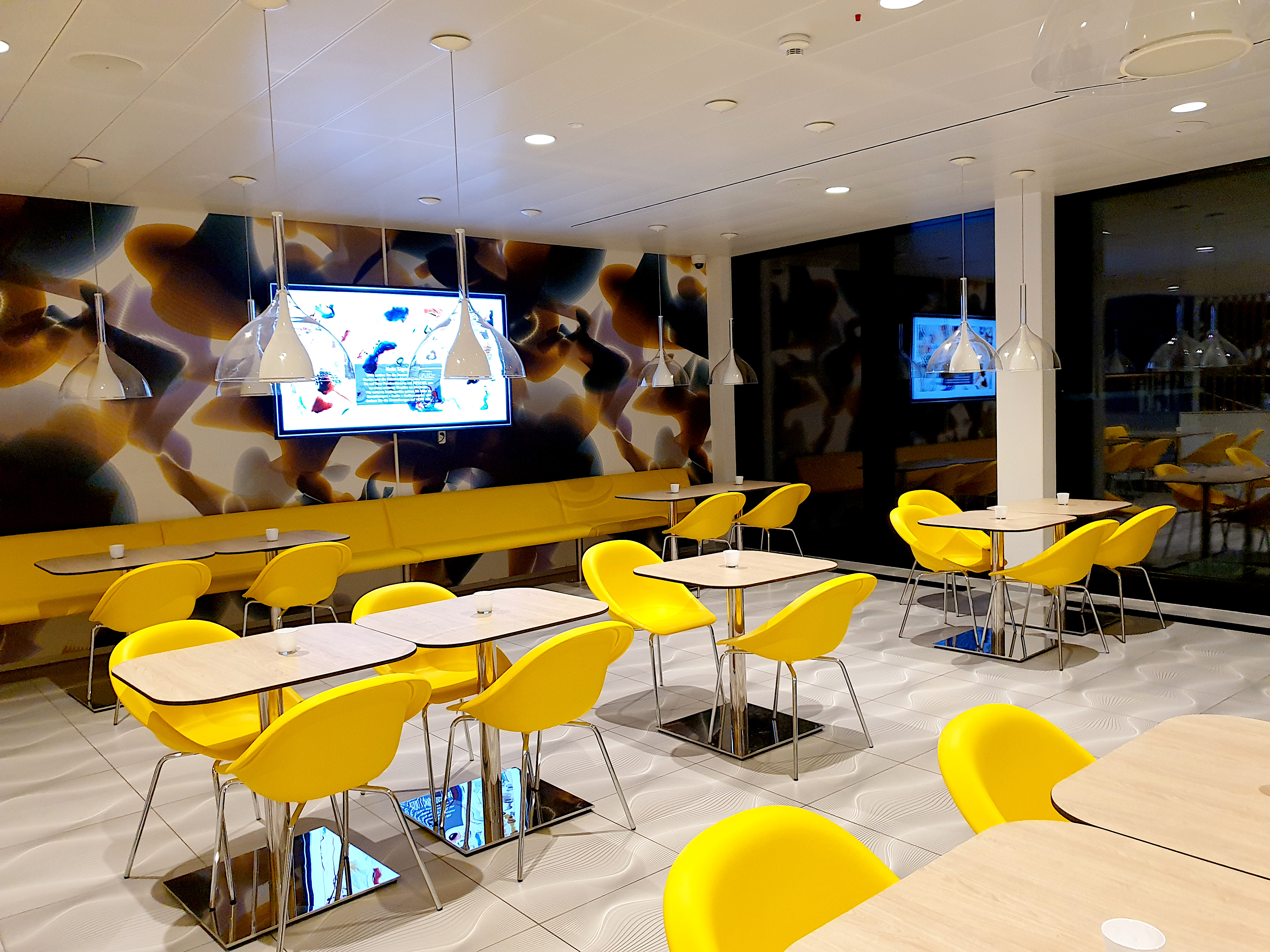
Radisson Hotel restaurant interior, Bern, Switzerland (2020)

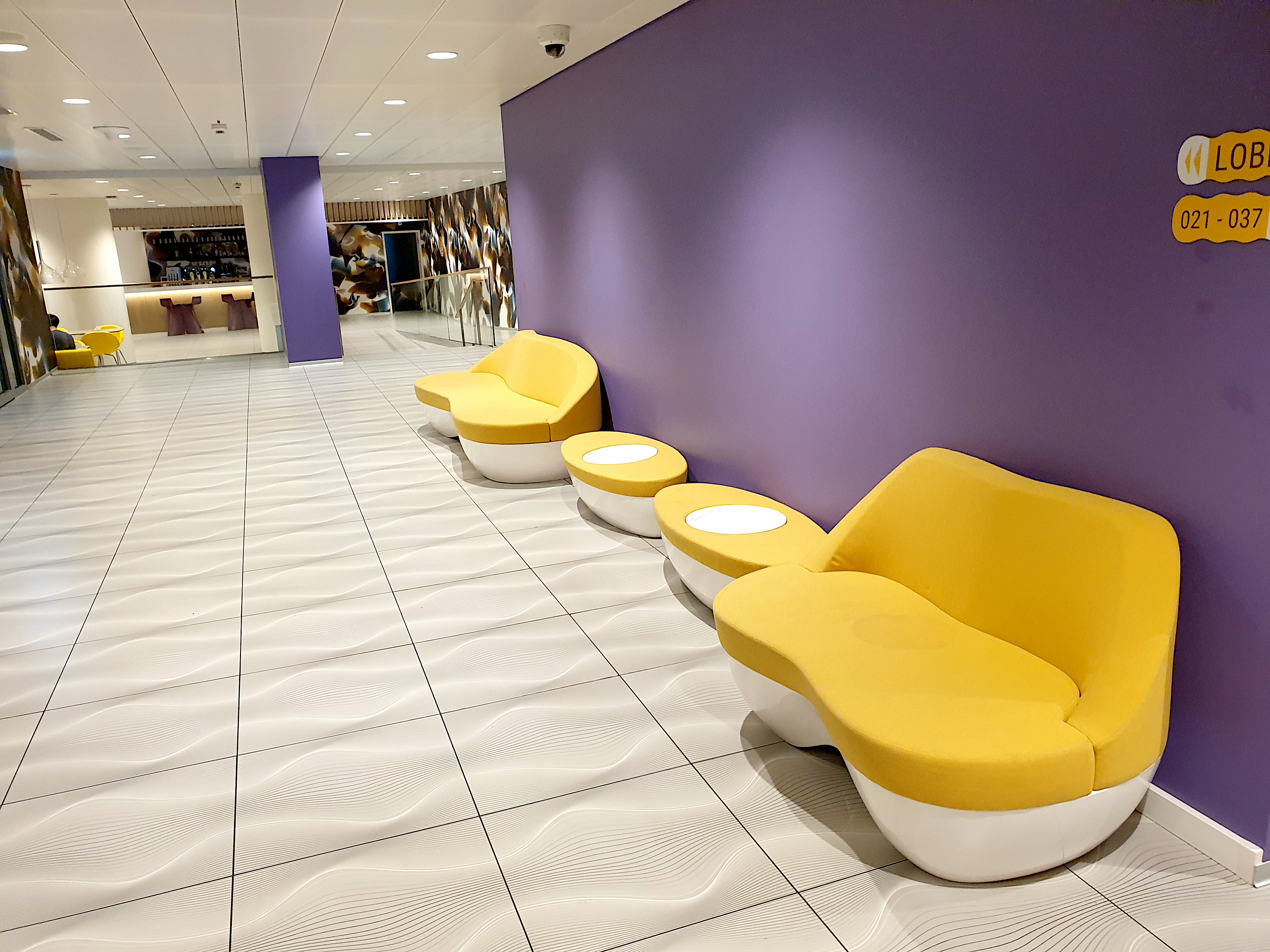
Prizeotel Bern-City (interiors designed by Rashid), Switzerland

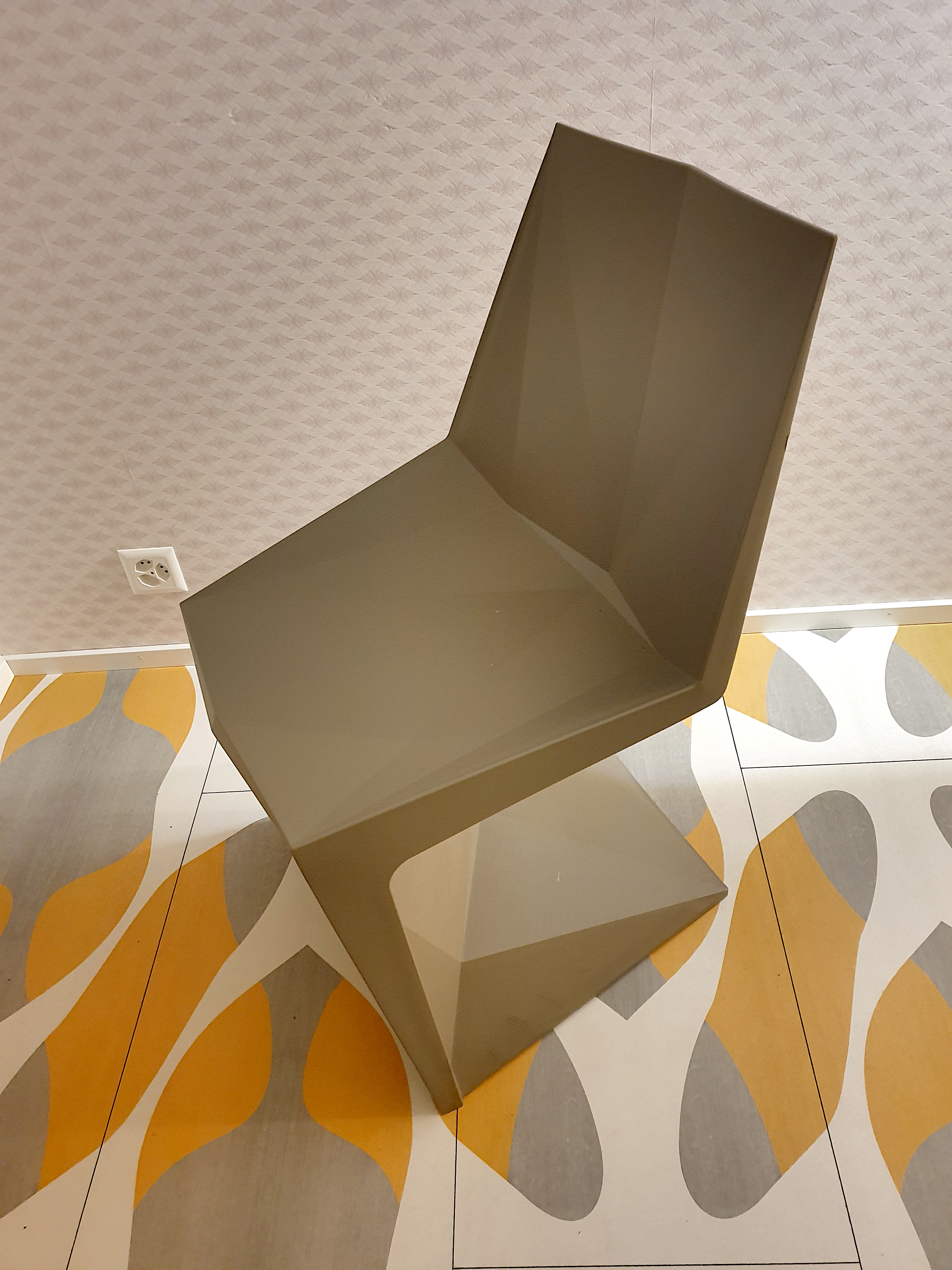
Chair by Rashid in Prizeotel Bern-City

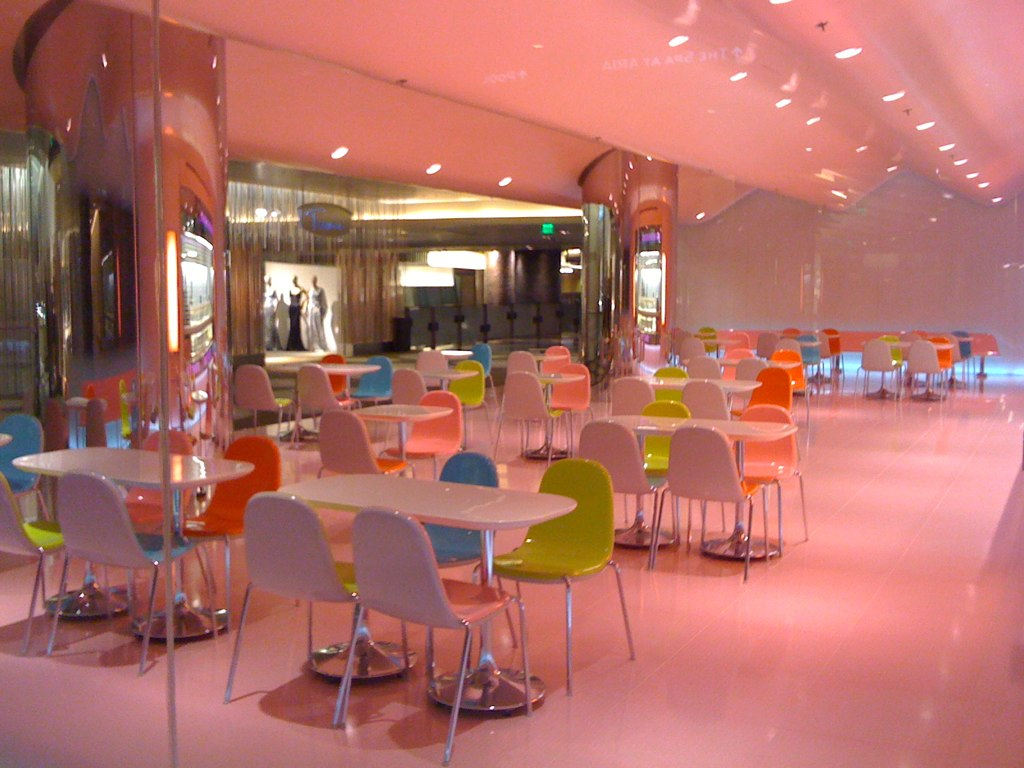
Sweet Chill ice cream at the MGM City Center, Las Vegas (2009)

Karim Rashid (born 1960) is an Egyptian-born and Canadian-raised American industrial designer. His designs encompass a wide range of products, including luxury goods, furniture, lighting, surface design, brand identity, and packaging. Rashid was described by the Toronto Star as "one of the world's most famous industrial designers" and as the "Prince of Plastic" by Time magazine. He is based in New York City.

== Early life and education ==
Karim Rashid was born in 1960 in Cairo, Egypt, to an English mother and an Egyptian father who was an abstract artist. Rashid is the brother of the architect Hani Rashid of Asymptote. His sister, Soraya Rashid, is a painter and musician. He was born with the umbilical cord wrapped around his neck and experienced developmental delays, being unable to speak until the age of four. The family emigrated to Mississauga, Ontario, Canada, when Karim was five years old.

He attended Woodlands Secondary School in Mississauga, Ontario, where he sewed himself a pink satin suit for his graduation. He received a Bachelor of Industrial Design in 1982 from Carleton University in Ottawa, Ontario, Canada. He pursued graduate design studies in Naples, Italy, under Ettore Sottsass and then moved to Milan for a year, working at the Rodolfo Bonetto Studio.

== Career ==
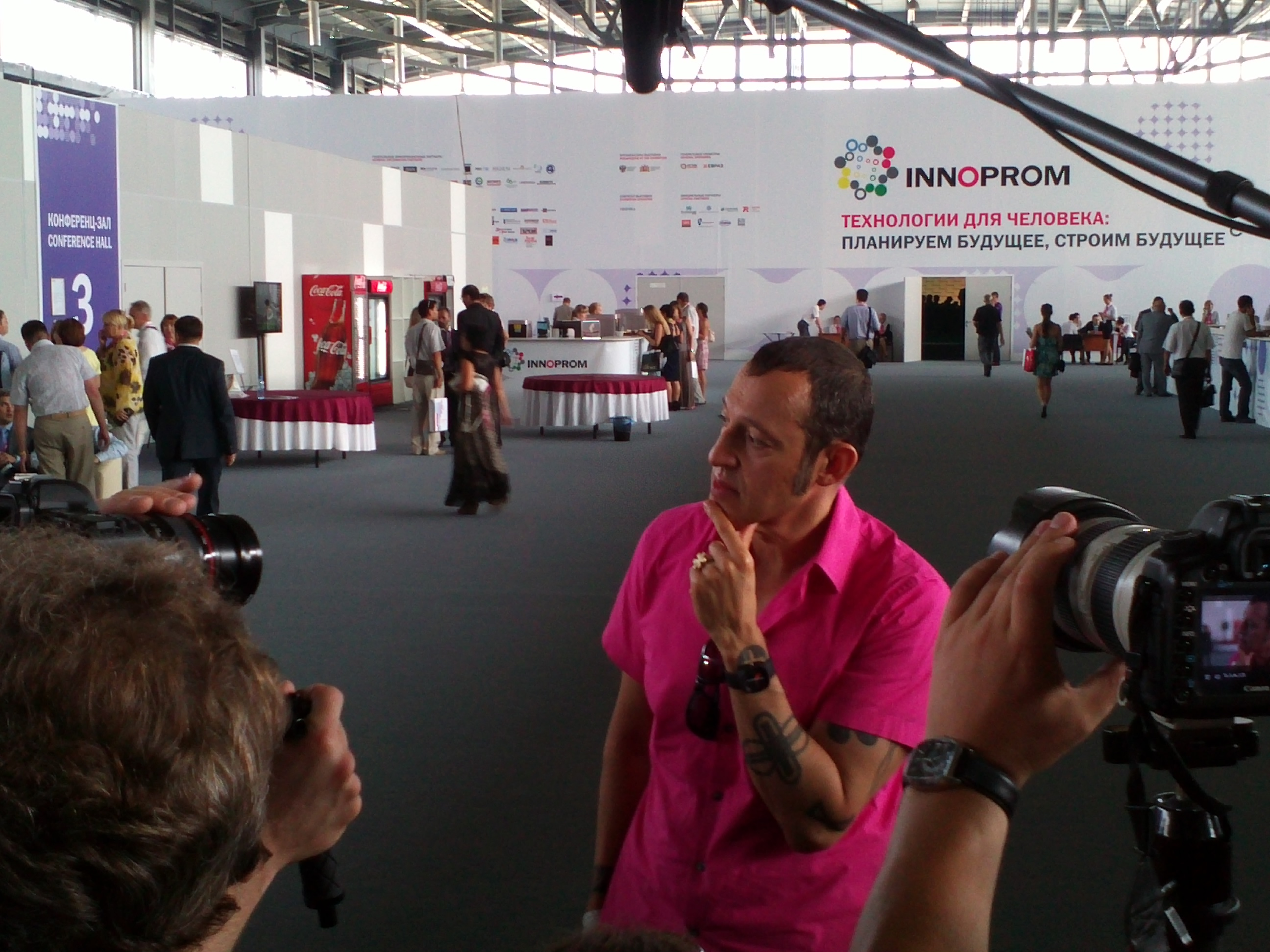
2012 Innoprom exhibition, Ekaterinburg, Russia (Rashid in pink)

Starting in 1984, Rashid worked with KAN Industrial Designers in Canada for seven years, where he designed x-ray equipment and small objects, such as a mailbox and a snow shovel. From 1985 until 1991, he co-founded and designed the Babel Fashion Collection and North. In 1993 Rashid opened a design studio in New York City.

His pieces are exhibited in museums including the Museum of Modern Art, Centre Pompidou, and SFMOMA. He is known for designs such as the "Garbo" waste can and "Oh Chair" for home accessories company Umbra, a concept store for Giorgio Armani, perfume bottles for Kenzo, bobble water bottle, watches and tableware for Alessi, lighting for Artemide and Martinelli Luce, and products for Veuve Clicquot. He has also worked with Audi, Samsung, Swarowski and Armani. In addition Rashid has designed for Kenzo, Method, Bombay Saffire, Finé Water Japan, Sexy Beast USA, Davidoff, Issey Miyake, Estee Lauder. In 1999, he designed manhole covers for the sewers of New York.

Rashid has discussed his interest in the psychological power of objects and spaces, and often works with color palettes which have emotional significance to him; pink, for example, is a staple in his designs as he believes it "creates a sense of well-being, or energy, or of positive spirit," and lime green is used in kitchens as it is "conducive to dining". He describes his style as "sensual minimalism". He was the first designer to participate in the "design burger" "Design Dialogues", a series of visual interviews in which the designer is given a Copic pen and number of written prompts, and responds to these with only drawings.

In 2004, Rashid designed his first hotel, the Semiramis in Athens, Greece. In 2008, he teamed up with prizeotel founder and CEO Marco Nussbaum, to become the exclusive designer for the Economy-Design Hotelbrand.

In 2012, Rashid collaborated with artist Terence Koh, for a limited edition of winter coats for the 10th anniversary of the Italian Brand Peuterey.

Rashid was selected in 2014 to design several real estate developments in New York City for HAP Investments, a New York City-based international investment group.

In 2016, it was announced that Rashid would design the multimillion-dollar makeover of Temptation Resort and Spa, in Cancun Mexico.

Karim Rashid is known for wearing white or pink clothing.

== Awards ==
Rashid holds an honorary doctorate degrees from the OCAD University (formerly Ontario College of Art & Design) in 2006, Pratt Institute in 2014 and Corcoran School of the Arts and Design in 2005. And in 2016 an honorary doctorate, Doctor of Laws, or honoris causa, from Carleton University.

In 2012, Danish designer and manufacturer BoConcept collaborated with Rashid to create the Ottawa Collection, which won the Red Dot Design Award.

In 2017 Rashid was awarded the Lawrence Israel Prize by the Fashion Institute of Technology in New York City.

== Personal life ==
Rashid's first marriage was to digital painter Megan Lang in 1995. He met Lang in 1991 while briefly teaching as an assistant professor at the Rhode Island School of Design; she was an undergraduate student at the time. The couple divorced in 2005.

In 2008, he married Ivana Purić, a Serbian chemical engineer. He met Ivana Puric at a party in Belgrade in 2006 while working as an ambassador for the second instalment of Belgrade Design Week. They have one child, born in 2013. They legally separated in 2016, and divorced in 2018.

Rashid married Kiana Ahmadi (c. 2025).

== Publications ==
- 2001 I Want to Change the World. New York, NY: Universe Rizzoli, 2001. ISBN 978-0-7893-0531-2
- 2003 International Design Yearbook 18
- 2004 Karim Rashid: Evolution New York, NY: Universe, 2004. ISBN 978-0-7893-1197-9
- 2004 Karim Rashid. San Francisco: * Marisa Bartolucci, Raul Cabra. Karim Rashid. San Francisco: Chronicle Books, ISBN 978-0-8118-4208-2
- 2005 Digipop. Karim Rashid, Taschen, ISBN 978-3-8228-3995-9
- 2006 Design Your Self: Rethinking the Way You Live, Love, Work, and Play
- 2009 Karim Rashid Space: The Architecture Of Karim Rashid
- 2012 Sketch: Karim ISBN 978-90-77174-61-6
- 2012 I Protagonisti del Design: Karim Rashid. Milan: Hachette, 2012
- 2013 Karim Rashid – Ideologija ljepote Tihomir Milovac. (in Croatian). Zagreb: Muzej Suvremene Umjetnosti, 2013
- 2014 Karim Rashid: From the Beginning ISBN 978-88-96780-60-2
