= Matija Vuković =

Serbian sculptor (1925–1985)

- Born: Matija Vuković; 26 July 1925; Platičevo, Kingdom of Yugoslavia
- Died: 21 June 1985 (aged 59); Belgrade, Socialist Federal Republic of Yugoslavia
- Education: Belgrade
- Known for: sculpture
- Notable work: Woman with Dead Child, Wounded Man, Bison, Perun, As, Njegoš

Matija Vuković (Platičevo, 26 July 1925 – Belgrade, 21 June 1985) was a Serbian sculptor.

== Biography ==
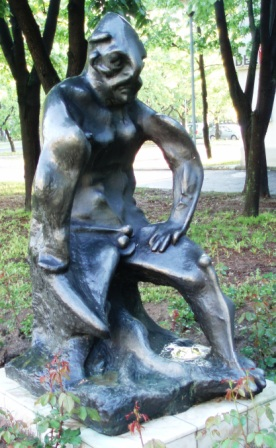
Perun, Matija Vuković, (1962), Municipality Hall of New Belgrade, Novi Beograd

Matija Vuković was born into a poor farming family in Platičevo, on 26 July 1925. From his native village, near Ruma, after primary school, in 1937, the boy and his mother move to Belgrade, near the studios of the famous sculptor Toma Rosandić. He was fascinated by the Maestros "huge figures", then Mestrović's sculptures, and then in one of the books he got as a present book, he saw Michelangelo's Moses. All this will paved his way into the art. Vuković attended private art school of Mladen Josić in 1941 – 1942.

Immediately after the liberation of the Belgrade, in October 1944, Matija Vuković was mobilized and sent to the Syrmian Front, where, during a charge, he was wounded in the hand. He returned home as a disabled veteran and – devoted himself entirely to sculpture. Having successfully met the entrance exam, he studied at the Academy of Fine Arts and was treated in parallel. He learned from the top Yugoslav sculptor Tom Rosandić, and then attended the class of the professor Sreten Stojanović. He starts to exhibit in group exhibitions in 1949. Vuković graduated from the Academy of Fine Arts in 1952. In 1954. during special classes of prof. Ilija Kolarević he sculpts "Wounded Man" (1952–1953), which revealed his original creative style. First solo exhibition Matija Vuković had in 1954. at the Art Gallery at Kalemegdan. He has participated in numerous group exhibitions at home and abroad.

His life was hard and he was for the most part misunderstood by his surroundings and critics. He died in Belgrade on 21 June 1985, after long disease.

== Style ==
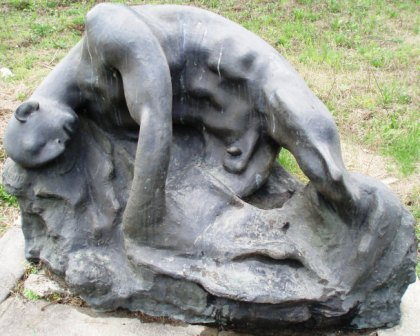
Wounded Man, Matija Vuković, 1952–53.

Matija Vuković appeared at the time of break from the aesthetics of socialist realism, in the early 1950s, with works that are significantly different from academic form. His basic forms, that retain the illusion of "realism" and a distant figurative narrative, are shaped by powerful, cruel, deformed masses that have a vibrant creative expression of the author, which became his plastic sign, and at the same time, a unique figure in the Yugoslav sculpture of the late 20th century. With his work Matija Vuković pointed to yet another possibility of modernizing new form, which will be free to develop towards plastic conceived by the author. Matija Vuković has built one of the most authentic works of contemporary Serbian and Yugoslav sculpture after 1950.

== Exhibitions (solo, selection) ==
- 1954 Art pavilion, Belgrade
- 1960 Club of Artists, Novi Sad; Art pavilion, Belgrade
- 1972 ULUS gallery, Belgrade
- 1979 "Dom omladine" gallery, Belgrade
- 1981 Yugoslav cultural center, Paris
- 1982 "Pinki" gallery, Zemun
- 1987 Matija Vuković 1925–1985, (retrospective exhibition), Museum of Contemporary Art, Belgrade

== Works (selection) ==
- 1951 "The boy with a pitcher," Pioneer city, Belgrade
- 1952 – 1953 "Wounded Man", Park in front of the Museum of Contemporary Arts, Belgrade
- 1953 "As" – park in the Memorial center "Josip Broz Tito", Belgrade
- 1954 "Njegoš", Aranđelovac
- 1955 "Woman with Dead Child", Vrnjačka Banja
- 1956 "Bison", Pioneer Town, Belgrade; in front of the Municipality of New Belgrade, Novi Beograd; Belgrade city museum, Belgrade
- 1961 – 1962 "Death of a swan" – fountain, Vrnjačka Banja
- 1962 "Perun" in front of the Municipality of New Belgrade, Novi Beograd
- 1969 "The head of Beethoven", Doblhoff Park, Baden
- 1970 "Monument to the fallen soldiers," Stubline, Obrenovac
- 1977 "Monument to the first Tito's relay", Kragujevac

== Recognition ==
- 1962 Award for sculpting of III October exhibition, Belgrade
- 1968 Award for sculpting of XIII exhibition of Art colony Ečka, Zrenjanin
- 1973 "October award" of city of Belgrade for sculpting, Belgrade
- 1981 "4th July" award of SUBNOR of Yugoslavia fund, Belgrade
- 1982 "7th July" award of SR Serbia for lifework, Belgrade

A street in Belgrade is named after of sculptor Matija Vuković.

== Gallery ==
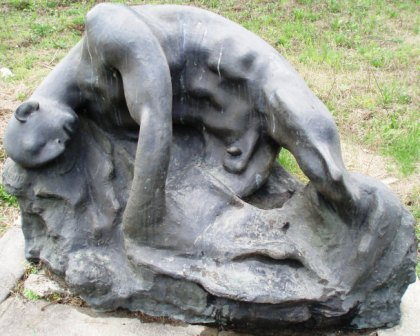
Wounded Man, (1952–53), Park in front of the Museum of Contemporary Arts, Belgrade

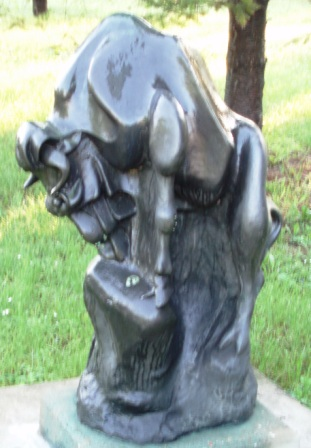
Bison, (bronze), (1956), Pioneer Town, Belgrade; (bronze) in front of the Municipality Hall of New Belgrade, Novi Beograd

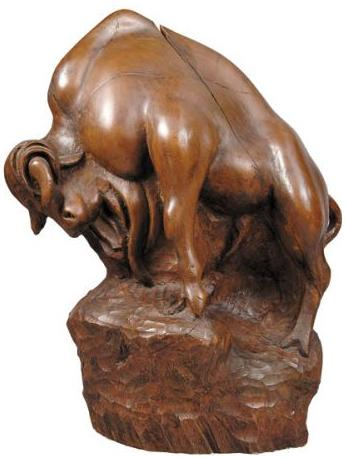
Bison, Matija Vuković, (1956), wood, Belgrade city museum

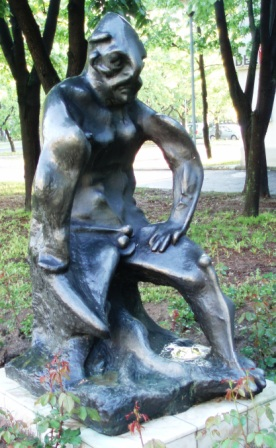
Perun, (1962), (bronze), in front of the Municipality of New Belgrade, Novi Beograd

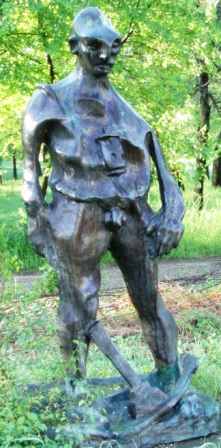
Miner, (bronze), Museum of Contemporary Arts, Belgrade

== Bibliography ==
- Vranić, Dragana (1986). Matija Vuković, 1925–1985: Retrospektivna izložba, 1950–1985. Muzej savremene umetnosti. ISBN 86-7101-008-2.
- 1954 Pavle Stefanović, Vajarski start Matije Vukovića, Književne novine, 17. jun, Beograd
- 1957 Lazar Trifunović, Savremena srpska skulptura, Izraz, knj. I, s. 280–284, Sarajevo
- 1959 Lazar Trifunović, Umetnost Matije Vukovića, Polja, 31. oktobar, Novi Sad
- 1960 Lazar Trifunović, pred. kat. samostalne izložbe, Umetnički paviljon, Beograd
- 1970 Lazar Trifunović, Putevi i raskršća srpske skulpture, Umetnost, br. 22, s. 5–38, Beograd
- 1971 Miodrag B. Protić, Dvadeseti vek – savremena umetnost, pred. kat. Umetnost na tlu Jugoslavije od praistorije do danas, Grand palais, Pariz, Skenderija, Sarajevo
- 1972 Đorđe Kadijević, Matija, NIN, 8. oktobar, Beograd
- 1973 Kosta Bogdanović, Prilog mišljenju o Matiji, Izraz, januar, knj. XXXIII, s. 71–73, Sarajevo
- 1979 Slobodan Ristić, Izložba Matije Vukovića, Politika, 17. januar, Beograd
- 1982 Miodrag B. Protić, Skulptura HH veka, izd. Umetnost na tlu Jugoslavije, s. 101, Jugoslavija, Beograd, Spektar, Zagreb, Prva književna komuna, Mostar
- 1987 Grupa autora, Matija Vuković 1925–1985, (kat. retrospektivne izložbe), Muzej savremene umetnosti, Beograd
