= Trajković =

Trajković (Cyrillic script: Трајковић) is a common surname derived from the South Slavic masculine given name Trajko.

== Geographical distribution ==
As of 2014, 88.2% of all known bearers of the surname Trajković were residents of Serbia (frequency 1:360), 8.3% of Kosovo (1:1,002) and 2.4% of the Republic of Macedonia (1:3,905).

In Serbia, the frequency of the surname was higher than average (1:360) in the following districts:

1. Pčinja District (1:40)
2. Jablanica District (1:84)
3. Nišava District (1:275)
4. Podunavlje District (1:295)

== People ==
- Aleksandar Trajković (born 1981), football defender
- Aleksandra Trajković (born 1975), pianist
- Branislav Trajković (born 1989), footballer
- Nikola Trajković (born 1981), football midfielder
- Slobodan Trajković (born 1954), artist
- Vlastimir Trajković (born 1947), composer and professor
- Željko Trajković (born 1966), wrestler
