= Milovan Destil Marković =

Serbian visual artist

- Born: November 9, 1957 (age 68)
- Known for: Visual arts

Milovan DeStil Marković (Serbian Cyrillic: Милован ДеСтил Марковић; born 9 November 1957 in Čačak, Yugoslavia, today Serbia) is a Serbian visual artist, who began his career in the early 1980s. Active for over two decades, he is recently described as father of transfigurative painting and the text portrait. Visiting Professor Art in Context at the University of Arts, Berlin.

== Biography ==
=== Early life ===
Marković's grandfather was a known distiller of slivovitz (Serbian plum brandy) and producer of special hand made gravestones (krajputaš). His grandfather's nickname was "Destilacija" (Destillation), the name that Marković added to his name as Destil, meaning the distillation of ideas into art. Both his parents were partisans during the Second World War. His father Radomir, after coming back from war captivity in Nazi Germany, was a political commissar. His mother Olga was a skilled and emancipated woman. Together with his older brother Dragan he started to paint at a very early age. Marković went to elementary school and later to high school in Požega. In 1976 he tried to enroll the University of Belgrade's Faculty of Philosophy, but was not accepted. In the same year, he began preparing for the Faculty of Fine Art.

=== Belgrade ===
From 1977 to 1983, Marković was a student at the Faculty of Fine Arts at the University of Belgrade and graduated with an MA. Since 1979, he has been active as a professional artist. From 1979 to 1986, he collaborated with the Student Culture Centre (SKC) in Belgrade where he organised projects, concerts, events and exhibited many times. On April 14, 1981, he proclaimed the World Art Day and became the first Monument of Art performing on Marshal Tito street in front of the SKC. Together with Vlasta Mikić he founded the artist group Žestoki in 1982 and opened the club Akademija (popularly called "Rupa") in the cellar of the Faculty of Fine Arts. Club Akademija was a very important place for the art and new wave scene of the eighties in Belgrade and achieved cult status. Marković studied icons and frescos in Byzantine and Serbian monasteries. He collaborated with Vesna Viktoria Bulajić on the videos "Great Invocation" and "Sacred Warrior". With the TV Galerija art program he produced the video "Viktoria" on TV Belgrade and worked together with Boris Miljković and Srđan Šaper. Just after finishing his studies, Marković received the October Salon award in 1983 and in 1986, aged 28, the Vladislav Ribnikar award (Politika award) for his exhibition Euharistija at the Salon of the Museum of Contemporary Art, Belgrade. In 1986 he was selected for the international exhibition Aperto at the 42nd Venice Biennial.

=== Berlin ===
In 1986, Marković moved to West Berlin. During his early years in West Berlin he worked closely with the DAAD. Together with the Norwegian artist Sissel Tolaas he started a series of laboratory projects in 1987 in West Berlin, Bergen, Poznań and Brühl. He travelled to Brazil, Peru and Bolivia, published the book The Key of Creation and produced numerous videos and performances. He organized the Sava Projekt, the Shipyard Sava in Mačvanska Mitrovica, and the Park of the International Center Sava, Belgrade. On his 32nd birthday on November 9, 1989, the Berlin Wall fell. At the beginning of the nineties Marković moved to the eastern part of the city and collaborated with Kunst-Werke where, until 1995, he had a studio. In 1992, he participated in the exhibition Berlin 37 Räume. For the opening he organised a soccer game, "Artists against Curators". One year later, in 1993, Marković organised the exhibition Private at Kunst-Werke. During the early years of the war in Yugoslavia, Marković organised support for state independent media in Belgrade. In 1995, he began to work on transfigurative paintings (Lipstick Portraits) and founded "mock-up" Berlin. In 1997, his daughter was born. With Vlasta Mikić and Miroljub Marjanović, he collaborated on the internet project "worldbeograd" in 1999, later SeeCult.org. In 2000 he began research on wall pigment applications and pigmentation technology. In 2003, he began to work on text portraits and the Homeless Project. In 2006 Marković patented a wall-make-up binder for wall pigmentation technology. In 2007, he published his monograph Markovic - Transfigurative Works with the Verlag für Moderne Kunst, Nürnberg. In 2008, his monograph Milovan DeStil Markovic was published.

== Selected works ==
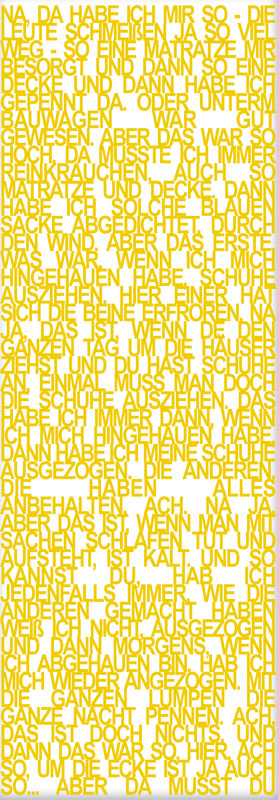
Portrait of Peter Scheller, 2006

In his recent work, Marković investigates the possibilities and challenges as well as the limits of visual representation in general, but is primarily concerned with the role of the close-up. Marković draws attention to the politics of representation involved in the production of visibility and invisibility of the human face. Both of these productions are socially conditioned and socially performed. Moreover, as often as not, they are produced in/by public space, where the "ideal face" may be used for fulfilling ideological, propaganda or market purposes.

=== "Lipstick Portraits", since 1995 ===
In the first series of Transfigurative Paintings, he portrayed women he considered to be the most renowned women of the world. Their faces are familiar to us because they have been reproduced thousands of times in the media: in newspapers, television, on the internet, etc. For each of the Lipstick Portraits, over 100 lipsticks are evenly applied onto a velvet surface. The painting material used is the most common substance for women's daily make-up, for making or reinventing the face. Marković indeed holds that make-up is women's self-portraiture. This series deals with female celebrities who owe their fame and public visibility to their respective profession or career.

=== "Text Portraits", since 2002 ===
His most recent series of Transfigurative Paintings unveils a completely different setting: unemployment, homelessness and social – that is: public – invisibility. In contrast to the women's portraits in which, by looking at the figure-less images, we rely on our memorized images to try to recall the women's "real" faces as we know them from the media, in Marković's portraits of homeless men, we are facing pictures of individuals who are anonymous to us, as they belong to a social group that each society in which they live tends to make invisible. These text portraits are based upon interviews Marković performed with homeless men in various world capitals. They represent the men's identities through their life stories; the real person is transfigured via an autobiographical text that is fixed onto canvas with pigments.

== Prizes and awards ==
- 2007 – Arbeitsstipendium, Senate of Berlin, Berlin
- 2005 – Katalogförderung, Senate of Berlin, Berlin
- 2004 – Hauptstadtkulturfonds, Berlin
- 2000 – Pollock-Krasner Foundation, New York
- 2000 – The City of Čačak, Čačak
- 1996 – 19th Memorial of Nadežda Petrović, Čačak
- 1991 – Arbeitsstipendium, Senate of Berlin, Berlin
- 1990 – Mileševa White Angel, Prijepolje
- 1986 – Politikina nagrada, Fond Vladislav Ribnikar, Belgrade
- 1983 – 24 October Salon, Belgrade

== Bibliography ==
=== Monographs, books and catalogues of solo exhibitions ===
- Milovan Destil Markovic – Works 1980-2020, monograph, Banja Luka: Museum of Contemporary Art, Belgrade: Kulturni centar Beograda and SEEcult.org, 2019. Text: Danijela Purešević, Bojana Pejić, Benedikt Stegmayer, Boris Buden, Miroljub Mima Marjanovic.
- Milovan DeStil Markovic, monograph, Čačak: Umetnička galerija "Nadežda Petrović", 2008. Text: Ješa Denegri, Jovan Despotovic, Benedikt Stegmayer, Boris Buden.
- Markovic: Transfigurative Works, monograph, Nürnberg: Verlag für Moderne Kunst, 2006. Text: Boris Buden, Bojana Pejić, Claudia Wahjudi, Yoshiko Honda
- Markovic: Transfigurative Painting, Berlin: Galerie A. von Scholz, 1996
- Marković: Prototipovi / Prototypes, Belgrade: Galerija Zvono, 1996. Text: Miroljub Marjanović
- Milovan De Stil Marković, Prijepolje: Dom revolucije, 1991
- Milovan Markovic, Sissel Tolaas, Laboratorium - The Key of Creation, book, Berlin: Deutscher Akademischer Austauschdienst (DAAD), 1988
- Destil Marković, Vlasta Mikić, Novi Sad: Galerija kulturnog centra, 1985. Text: Ješa Denegri
- De Stil Marković: Euharistija, Belgrade: Museum of Contemporary Art, 1985. Text: Bojana Pejić
- De Stil Marković: Crni prostor / Black Space, Belgrade: Student Culture Centre (SKC), 1983. Text: Bojana Pejić
- De Stil Marković: Fragmenti slike: spomenik, Belgrade: Student Culture Centre (SKC), 1982. Text: Bojana Pejić
