= Musović =

Musović is a Serbo-Croatian surname. Notable people with the surname include:

- Tafil Musović, Serbian painter
- Miljana Bojović (née Musović, born 1987), Serbian basketball player

== See also ==
- Mušović
