= Mušović =

Mušović is a Serbo-Croatian surname. Notable people with the surname include:

- Džemaludin Mušović (born 1944), Bosnian football manager
- Lepa Lukić (née Mušović) (born 1940), Serbian singer
- Miljana Musović (born 1987), Serbian basketball player
- Tafil Musović (born 1950), Dutch painter
- Zećira Mušović (born 1996), Swedish footballer

== See also ==
- Musović
- Mušić
