= Slobodanka Stupar =

Serbian artist

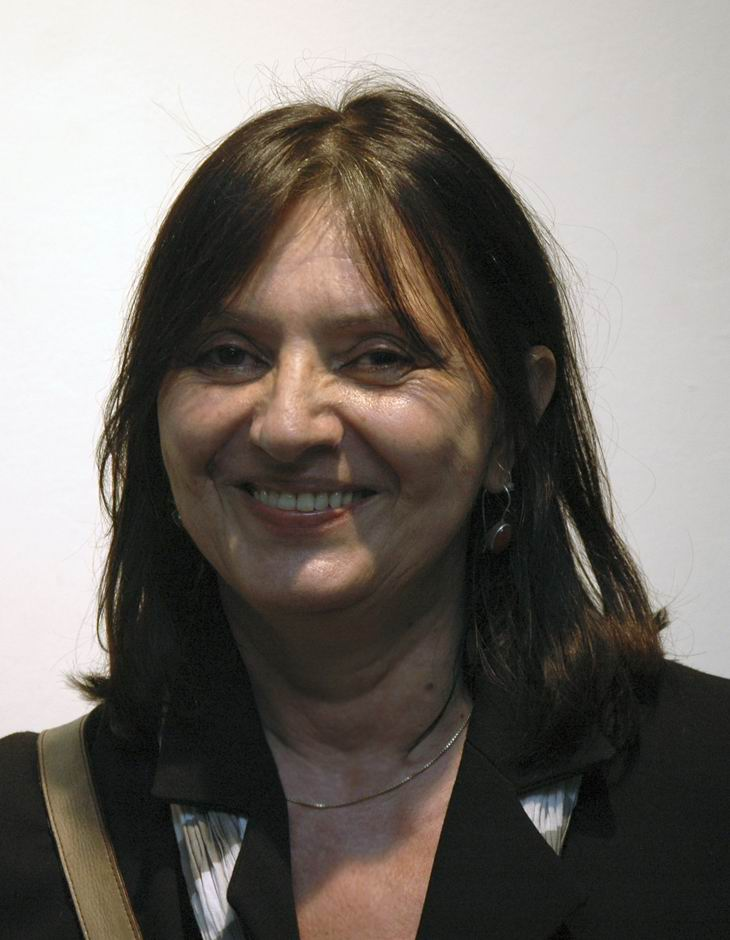
- Born: Slobodanka Stupar; 1947 (age 78–79); Sarajevo, FPR Yugoslavia
- Known for: Multimedia artist

Slobodanka Stupar (born 1947 in Sarajevo), is Serbian visual artist who lives and works in Belgrade, Athens and Cologne.

== Biography ==
Slobodanka Stupar graduated from Applied Arts School in Belgrade (B.F.A.)

She graduated School of Fine Arts at University of Belgrade (M.F.A.)

She specialized at the School of Fine Arts in Athens.

== The work ==
The separation of elementary metaphors and other figurative mechanisms, i.e. deconstruction, has become an effective tool for understanding and interpreting recent visual art. This is especially true where the artist has moved from a more "classical" form of expression, arising from an academic training, to a practice involving a visualized language and semantic composition mode of expression, of which Slobodanka Stupar is an example. This transition was all the more likely in her case given the freedom which she already had in using the graphic art medium, closer to experimentation than the reproduction of any standard approach. Even from the outset of her artistic career she had been leaning towards a reexamination of the expressive capabilities of visual art. Combining the incompatible, to maintain any discourse (in this case visual) one has to remove or circumvent ordinary comprehensibility, or "sense"; to make something "apparent" the plastic narrative had to be reduced to the brink of unrecognizability in order to be "seen" as a new work. This is precisely the kind of work Stupar has been producing over the last few years. The works at this exhibition are among those which have emerged from this new understanding of the function of art works as self-sufficient structures of meaning, autonomously establishing the scope of their own significance.

== Grants and residencies ==
- 1980–1981 Young Artists grant, Belgrade
- 1983 "Mosa Pijade" grant for residence in London
- 1985 Scholarship from Ministry of Education of Greece, Athens
- 1991 The Grant of Fondation pour une Entraide Intellectuelle Europeene, Paris
- 1996 Stiftung Kulturfonds, Haus Lukas, Ahrenshoop, (Germany)

== Awards and recognitions ==
- 1987 October Salon Price for Graphic Art, Belgrade
- 1987 Price for Sculpture from Art Colony Sisak, Sisak, (Croatia)
- 1989 Purchase Price from the National University Library at XII Zagreb, Exhibition of Contemporary Yugoslav Drawing, Zagreb
- 1990 Grand Prix at the IX Frechen International Graphic Triennial, Germany
- 1993 2nd Prize at Biennial of Dry Point, Užice, (Yugoslavia)
- 1997 Purchase Price from National Museum at Belgrade International Biennial of Graphic Art, Belgrade
- 1999 Price at Fotowettbewerb Award 1999. Digitale Fotografie, Stuttgart

== Selected solo exhibitions ==
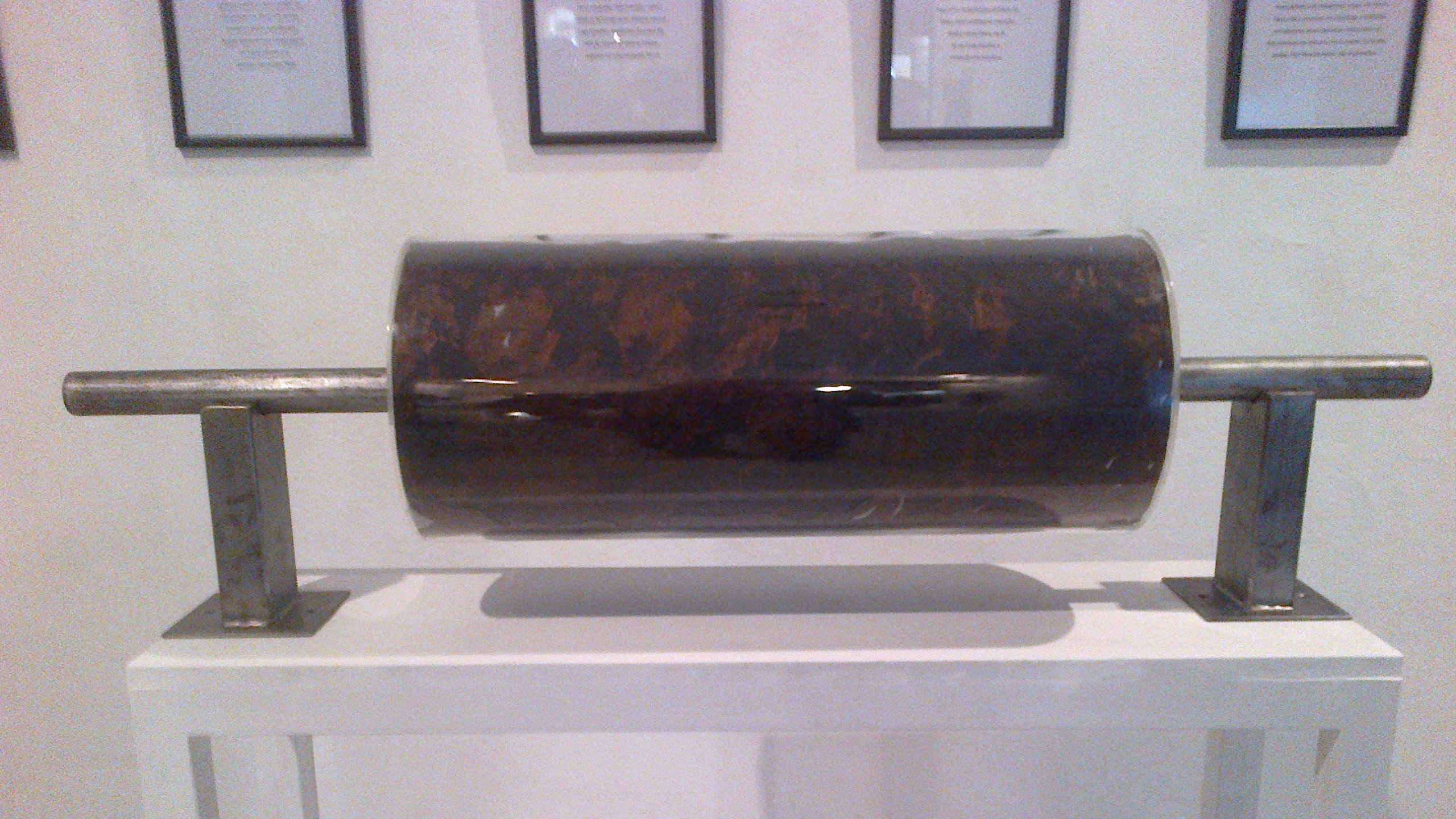
Mystery of Letter, 1997-2009.jpg

- 1979 Gallery Grafički Kolektiv, Belgrade
- 1980 Sebastian Gallery, Dubrovnik
- 1984 Richard Demarco Gallery, Edinburgh
- 1987 Kreonidis Gallery, Athens
- 1988 Art Gallery Christos Kyriazis, Athens
- 1990 Cultural Centre Gallery, Belgrade
- 1992 Ligue Franco-Hellenique Gallery, Athens
- 1992 Rozmarin Gallery, Munich, Olching
- 1995 Rathaus Köln, Cologne
- 1995 Simultanhalle, Cologne
- 1996 BAP, Witten, (Germany)
- 1996 BBK Gallery, Cologne
- 1997 Kaos Gallery, Cologne
- 1997 Zlatno Oko Gallery, Novi Sad (Yugoslavia)
- 1998 Zepter Gallery, Belgrade
- 1999 Christuskirche Cologne, Cologne
- 2001 Artforum Gallery, Thessaloniki
- 2002 Cultural Centre Gallery, Belgrade
- 2003 Diana Gallery, Athens
- 2006 Artforum Gallery, Thessaloniki
- 2008 Zlatno Oko Gallery, Novi Sad (Yugoslavia)
- 2008 Moderna Gallery, Lazarevac, Belgrade
- 2009 Red Gallery, Athens
- 2011 Gallery "Beograd", Belgrade
- 2012 Gallery ULUS, Belgrade

== Other works and projects ==
- 1984 Symphony, performances at Festival Second New Music, Student Culturale Centre, Belgrade
- 1986 Secret life, Town Festival, Belgrade
- 1987 Area of Touch / Space of Contact, lecturing at Open School Djurdjevo, (Yugoslavia)
- 1992 Ceci n’est pas une pipe (communication project - live talk with the viewers, improvisational narration and excerpts from Miroslav Mandić’s book "Blue Rose"), collaboration with composer Lj. Jovanovic, Quantenpool Köln part of Kassel Documenta IX 's Piazza Virtuale TV project; live transmission on TV, Kassel and 3sat from Moltkerei Werkstatt, Cologne
- 1995 Mirror, performance in collaboration with LJ. Jovanovic, Simultanhalle, Cologne
- 1996 Ueber den Tiellerrand hinaus, performance with Inge Broska and Hans-Joerg, Tauschert at Tangenten Festival, Köln
- 1996 Answer to my Lette, open art project upon art communication
- 1999 WHAT IF…?, performance, Galičnik (Macedonia)

== Works in museums and public collections ==
Museum of Contemporary Art, Belgrade * Ludwig Museum, Cologne * National Museum, Belgrade * Museum of City of Belgrade Belgrade, * Museum Zepter, Belgrade * National Museum, Kraljevo * National Museum, Vranje * National Gallery of Piraeus, Greece * American College of Greece, Athens * Gallery of Contemporary Art, Zrenjanin * Art Collection of the National University Library, Zagreb * Art Collection "Lazar Vozarevis" Sremska Mitrovica * Collection of Graphic Art, Frechen * Museum of International Contemporary Graphic Art, Fredrikstad * Collection Grafički Kolektiv, Belgrade * Art Collections of Art Colonies Sisak, Poreč, Tuzla and Sopoćani

== Bibliography (selected) ==
- 1979 Petar Gudelj, "Ako mi je malo svjetlosti (Napisano pred grafikama Slobodanke Marinovic Stupar)”, pref. solo exhib. Graficki kolektiv, Belgrade
- 1979 Dusan Djokic, Umetnost 65
- 1980 Sonja Seferovic, "Emotivne akvatinte Slobodanke Stupar", Dubrovacki vjesnik br. 1547, 6 June, Dubrovnik
- 1982 Dusan Djokic, pref. solo exhib, Studio Gallery Forum, Zagreb
- 1982 Josip Depolo, "Slobodanka Stupar (Studio Gallery Forum"), "Oko" No. 22, Zagreb
- 1982 Dusan Djokic, "Slobodanka Stupar i Vesna Zlamalik: Graficki izraz i osecanje prirode", pref. National Museum, Novi Pazar
- 1984 "11 grafickih listova", pref. Gallery Sebastian, Varaždin
- 1985 Kosta Bogdanovic, pref. solo exhib. Gallery KNU, Belgrade
- 1985 Dusan Djokic, "Telo kao motiv, grafike i sculpture Slobodanke Stupar u galeriji KNU u Beogradu", Borba, 10 October, Belgrade
- 1986 Dusan Djokic, pref. solo exhib, Gallery Dom kulture, Smederevo
- 1986–1987 Zana Gvozdenovic, "Grafike Slobodanke Stupar, pref. solo exhib., Gallery of the Yugoslav Cultural Centre, Vienna, Gallery "Kreonidis", Athens
- 1987 "Stupar im Jugoslawischen Kulturzentrum", Diplomatic Correspondence 1/87
- 1987 Nikos Aleksiou, "Slobodanka Stupar", Rizospastis, 11 April
- 1987 "Najbolja djela – Salamun, Stupar", Vjesnik Zeljezare Sisak, 12 June, Sisak
- 1988 Aleksandar Djuric, "Budjenje Antropometrije iz nesvesti" pref. solo exhib., Gallery of Cultural Centre, Vranje
- 1988 Zana Gvozdenovic, "Prevlast pokreta", solo exhib. Gallery Cristos Kiriazis, Faliro, Athens
- 1990 Irina Subotic, "Ruke i krstovi", pref. solo exhib., Gallery Kulturni Centar, Belgrade
- 1990 Ljiljana Cinkul, "U galeriji KCB otvorena je izlozba slika i crteza Slobodanke Stupar", 3. program Radio Belgrade, 5 February, Belgrade
- 1990 D. Devic, "Belezenje dodira", Narodne novine, 14 March
- 1990 Jasmina Tuturov, "Unutrasnji kosmos, uz izlozbu Slobodanke Stupar u savremenoj Galeriji u Zrenjaninu", Zrenjanin
- 1992 "Ölgemälde von Stupar", Fürstenfeldbrucker Tagblatt, 12 March
- 1992 "Spurensuche in der Natur, Die Galerie Rozmarin zeigt Werke der Künstlerin Slobodanka Stupar", Münchener Merkur, April
- 1992 "Der Reiz liegt im unmittelbaren Ausdruck Kuenstlerischen Wollens", Fürstenfeldbrucker Tagblatt, November
- 1992 Jürgen Raap, "Quantenpool in der Moltkerei-Werkstatt" Kölner Illustrierte, September
- 1993 Bernd v. den Brinken, Nachtsendung (3.15-3.45) ”C’est ci n’est pas une pipe" – Slobodanka Stupar, Ljiljana Jovanovic", Quantenpool Köln, Vilter Verlag
- 1995 Dr. Bettina Mette, "Nine Doors to Nowhere" und "Vertical/The Passage", pref. solo exhib. Simultanhalle, Cologne
- 1995 Bruno Schneider, "Türen, die ins Nichts führen, Slobodanka Stupar zeigt in der Simultanhalle eine Installation aus Reispapier, Spiegelstreifen und Stahlwolle", Kölnische Rundschau/Kölner Kultur, 9 June
- 1995 Jürgen Schön, "Lichtspiele", Kölner Stadt-Anzeiger Nr. 140, 20 June
- 1995 "Werke ausländischer Kuenstler im Foyer des historischen Rathauses", Kölnische Rundschau, 14 September
- 1995 M. Zivojinov, "Ogledalo slike i muzike", Evropske Novosti, 21 September
- 1995 Ursula Franck, "Slobodanka Stupar (Simultanhalle Cologne, 28 May – June 1995) Arti October
- 1996 Jünger Küsters "Von Kunst und Alltag", Kölner Stadt-Anzeiger 16/17 March
- 1996 "Bilder voller Energie", Ruhr Nachtrichten, 17 October
- 1998 Jürgen Schön "Geheimnis der Schrift" Ausstellung Stupar, Kölner Stadt-Anzeiger Nr. 13, 16 January
- 1998 Gordana Stanisic, pref. cat. solo exhib., Gallery Zepter, Belgrade
- 1998 "Stepenice do neba", Novosti, 24 January
- 1998 Mirjana Radojcic "Nedodirljivi prostori", izlozba Slobodanke Stupar u galeriji Zepter, Politika 6 February, Belgrade
- 1998 Jovan Despotović, "Vrata i drugi zapisi Slobodanke Stupar" 3. Program Radio Belgrade, February, Belgrade
- 1998 Jovan Despotović, Slobodanka Stupar, Arti, vol. 39, May–July, p.p. 204-207, Athens
- 2000 Bia Papadopoulos, "Commentary on the Twentieth Century" pref. group exhib., Artforum Gallery, Thessaloniki
- 2002 Bia Papadopoulos, Slobodanka Stupar, "Mistirio ton Grammaton", pref. solo exhib., Artforum Gallery, Thessaloniki
- 2002 Sava Ristovic, pref. solo exhib., Gallery KC, Belgrade
- 2002 Lena Kokkini, pref. group exhib. "Terra Incognita" Diana Gallery, Athens
- 2003 Lena Kokkini, pref. solo exhib. Diana Gallery, Athens
- 2003 Bia Papadopoulos, "Witness" pref. cat. solo exhib., Diana Gallery, Athens
- 2003 Milena Marjanovic, "Saputanja iz jastuka", Blic, 8 October, Belgrade
- 2004 Bia Papadopoulos "In The Beginning Was Fire", pref. group exhib., Titanium Gallery, Athens
- 2007 Bia Papadopoulos, "Chronicle of the Absurd", pref. cat. group exhib., Museum of Photography, Thessaloniki
- 2008 Sava Ristovic, pref. for solo exhibition, Zlatno Oko, Novi Sad, Modern Gallery Lazarevac
- 2009 Bia Papadopoulos, Voyage of meditation and self- knowledge, pref. for solo exhibition, Red Gallery, Athens
- 2011 Jovan Despotović, Slobodanka Stupar, 3. program Radio Beograda, 25 February, Belgrade
- 2011 Jovan Despotović, Above and Below, pref., Subjectilе is Subjectilе, Gallery "Beograd", Belgrade ISBN 978-86-614-1014-7

== Sources ==
- Documentation of the Museum of Contemporary Art, Belgrade
- 2011 Subjectil is Subjectil, (monograph), Gallery "Beograd", Belgrade ISBN 978-86-614-1014-7
