= Lazar Trifunović =

Serbian art historian, art critic and professor

Lazar Trifunović (Belgrade, 14 January 1929 – Paris, 23 July 1983) was a Serbian art historian, art critic and professor at the University of Belgrade.

== Biography ==
He attended primary school and grammar school in Belgrade and graduated in art history 1955 at the Faculty of Philosophy of the University of Belgrade, where he earned in 1960 his PhD with the dissertation "Serbian painting in the first half of the XX century". He was an assistant professor at the Faculty of Philosophy in Belgrade from 1957 to 1976 when he was elected full professor of the History of Modern Art.

From 1962 to 1968 he was the director of National Museum in Belgrade. He was the founder and for a time the director of the Contemporary Gallery in Niš.

He was an art critic for almost three decades. As a student, he started publishing texts in "Vidici" and "Narodni student", publishing texts in NIN, Politika, and Umetnost, where he was the editor-in-chief, and other magazines and newspapers.

He was a member and president of the Yugoslav section of the AICA (International Association of Art Critics).

== Activity ==
Lazar Trifunović worked professionally in two basic areas: as a historian of (modern) art and art critic, as well as a professor of Modern Art at the University of Belgrade and a museologist as director of the National Museum and founder and director of the Gallery of Contemporary Art in Niš.

Trifunović was the founder of the Department of Modern Art at the Faculty of Philosophy in Belgrade, where he taught the history of modernism until the end of his life. He introduced the methodology of studying Serbian modern art on the basis of French Eastern art, which he presented in the capital, synthetic work "Serbian Painting 1900–1950" published in 1973, which was created from his doctoral dissertation in 1960. Another very important work by Lazar Trifunović is the anthology "Serbian Art Criticism" published in 1967, in which a systematic overview of the history of our art criticism from its beginnings to the end of the sixth decade was given for the first time. With these two books, Trifunović laid the foundations of the scientific study of modern Serbian art and art criticism.

As an art critic, he regularly wrote for numerous daily and weekly newspapers, professional magazines and other publications in which he followed the current art life. He started as a theatre critic and soon, during the sixth decade, he became the most influential art critic at the time when he was dealing with the interpretation of new phenomena on our art scene. As a critic of NIN from 1959 to 1963, his engagement in this field was especially emphasized when he clearly separated artistic from non-artistic phenomena. It was in that period that his zenith critical activity was noted, because as a critic and historian of the Belgrade Informel he wrote some of the most valuable pages of Serbian art criticism and theory in general, for example, the exhibition "Belgrade Informel (Young Painter)" in 1962 and the exhibition and study "Informel in Belgrade" 1982.

He also made a significant contribution as a museologist, since he brought numerous innovations to the work of the National Museum in Belgrade and the Gallery of Contemporary Art in Niš, where he was the director. Although the youngest director of this oldest museum institution in Serbia, Trifunović did not hesitate to introduce novelties that often met with strong resistance from the academic and artistic public. Adhering to the idea that museology, as well as other social sciences, is developing, he introduced into the activities of the National Museum the specifics that preceded the subsequent changes in many museum institutions in our country. He changed the way of working and the organization of this house, he periodized the history of Serbian art in a new way, he changed the setting appropriate for that time, he encouraged the curators to be much more engaged in the exhibition activity, etc. He set the protection of cultural goods and their publication, etc., on new foundations. He even managed to adapt this building (1964–1966) during his tenure, in a way that enabled it to be more active and more present in public.

== Legacy ==
Тhе Cultural Centre of Belgrade established the annual "Lazar Trifunović" Award in 1992.

== Bibliography ==
=== Books ===
- 1962 Paul Gauguin, Yugoslavia , Belgrade
- 1963 Gallery of European Masters, Yugoslavia ,[Belgrade
- 1963 Moša Pijade o umetnosti, Srpska književna zadruga , Belgrade
- 1964 Petar Lubarda, Painters and sculptors III, Prosveta , Belgrade
- 1964 Leonardo da Vinci, Institute for Textbook Publishing , Belgrade
- 1966 Vincent van Gogh, National Museum , Belgrade
- 1967 Serbian Art Criticism (Srpska likovna kritika) Srpska književna zadruga , Belgrade
- 1968 Milan Kašanin, Collected works, Matica srpska , Novi Sad, Srpska književna zadruga , Belgrade
- 1969 Risto Stijović, SANU Gallery , Belgrade
- 1973 Serbian painting 1900 – 1950 (Srpsko slikarstvo 1900–1950) Nolit , Belgrade
- 1973 Petar Ubavkić, Institute for Art History , Belgrade
- 1973 Sreten Stojanović, Srpska akademija nauka i umetnosti, Belgrade
- 1982 Od impresionizma do enformela: studije i članci o umetrnosti, Nolit Belgrade
- 1982 "Slikarski pravci XX veka", Jedinstvo
- 2003 "Serbia & Montenegro Monuments of Art: From Prehistory to the Present Day", Prosveta, Belgrade

== Sources ==
- Enciklopedija likovnih umjetnosti, 4. tom, Jugoslavenski leksikografski zavod , Zagreb, 1966, p. 452.
- Enciklopedija Jugoslavije, 8. tom, Jugoslavenski leksikografski zavod , Zagreb, 1971, p. 368.
- Slobodan Mijušković, "Lazar Trifunović 1929–1983", Moment , no. 1, p. 2-4, Belgrade, 1984.
- Bulatović, D. (ed.) Lazar Trifunović, Studies, Reviews, Criticisms , – {I-II} -, Museum of Contemporary Art , ed. Serbian Critics, 3–4, Faculty of Philosophy , National Museum , Belgrade, 1990.
- М. Rogić, Tumaci slike , Belgrade: Prosveta 2004. ISBN 978-86-07-01540-5
- Jerko Denegri, Lazar Trifunović kao kritičar i estetičar beogradskog enformela, Zbornik Narodnog muzeja, 15-2, Narodni muzej , Beograd, 1994. p. 249-263.
- Dobrica Čosić, 'Friends" (novel), Politics , Narodna knjiga , Belgrade, 2005.
- Vesna Kruljac, "Lazar Trifunović: Protagonist and antagonist of an epoch", monograph, "National Museum", Belgrade, 2009.
