= Jovan Despotović =

Serbian art historian (1952–2026)

- Јован Деспотовић
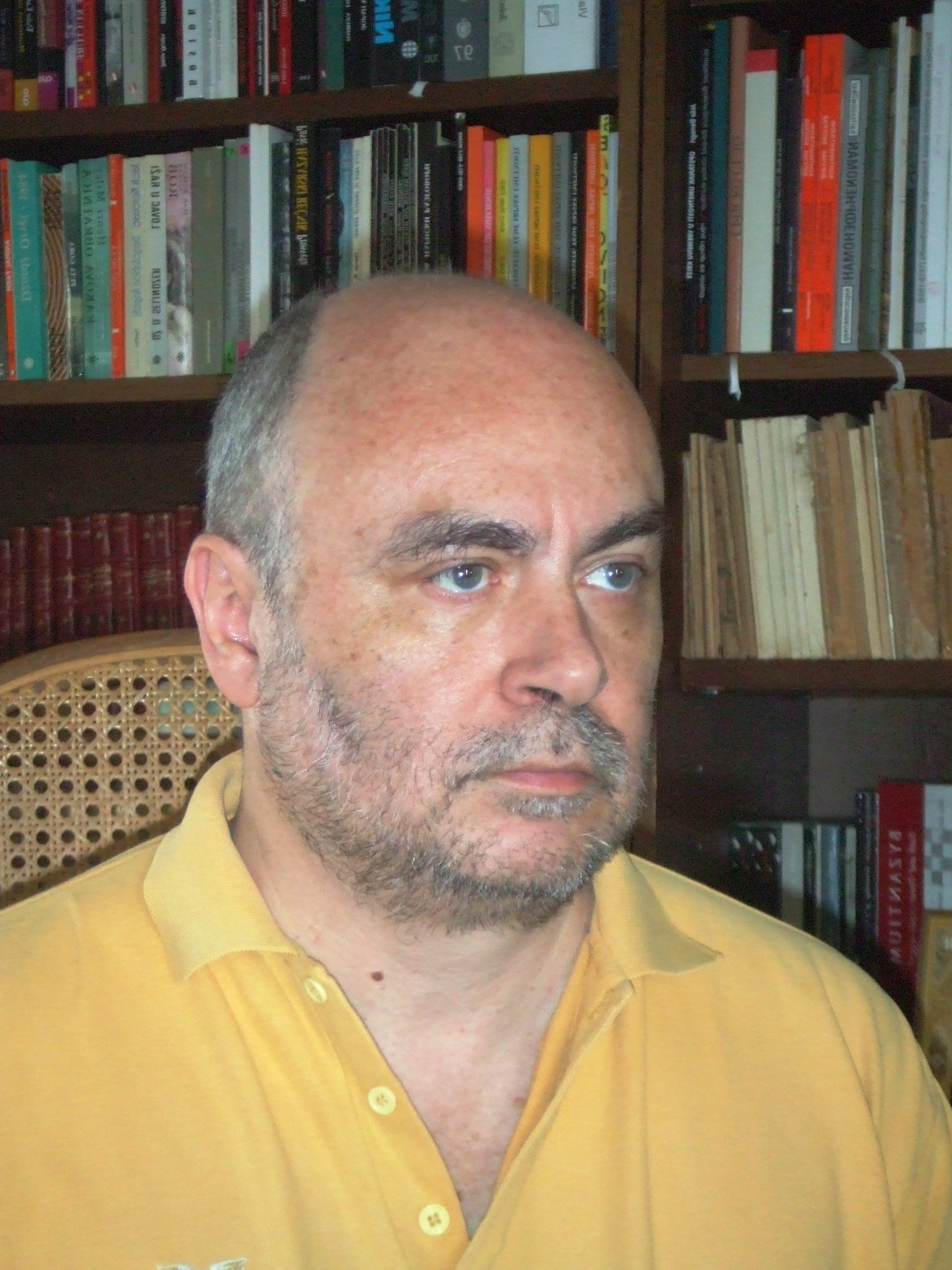
- Portrait of Jovan Despotović, 2010
- Born: 16 April 1952; Belgrade, PR Serbia, FPR Yugoslavia
- Died: October 2026 (aged 74); Belgrade, Serbia
- Known for: Art historian, art critic

Jovan Despotović (Serbian Cyrillic: Јован Деспотовић; 16 April 1952 – October 2026) was a Serbian art historian and art critic who lived in Belgrade.

== Background ==
Jovan Despotović was educated at the University of Belgrade, SFR Yugoslavia (now the Republic of Serbia), earning an academic degree in art history in 1976.

From 2001 to 2004, Despotović was the Deputy Minister of Culture for the Republic of Serbia. He was also director for the protection of cultural heritage at the Coordination Center for Kosovo and Metohija. From 2004 to 2014, he was editor of the Cultural and Information Desk for the Third Programme of Radio Belgrade and Radio Television of Serbia. From 2014 to 2015, he was director of The Museum of Contemporary Art in Belgrade. From 2015, he was the Editor in Chief of documentary programming at Radio Television of Serbia, a post from which he retired in 2017.

He was the Yugoslav Commissioner at the 7th International Small Sculpture Exhibition in Budapest (1987), and the 22nd Biennale in São Paulo in 1994.

Despotović died in Belgrade in October 2026, at the age of 74.

== Area of interest ==
Despotović published over 2,000 articles, critical reviews, and essays and was the founder and editor of numerous journals: Sveske (edition Association of Art Historians of Serbia), Vreme umetnosti (a special supplement of the Vreme weekly), Treći program (edition Radio Belgrade), and Moment. His work has been translated into at least 13 languages.

== New Now – New Wave ==
Despotović published art criticism and articles since 1978. At the beginning of the 1980s, he participated in the creation and development of New Wave with a group of young Serbian artists in Belgrade. New Wave was a countercultural art movement that aimed to challenge expectations of the time. With numerous writings and art exhibitions, Despotović contributed to New Image Painting ('Nova Slika'), notably in Serbia (formerly Yugoslavia) and abroad.

== Cultural policy ==
Despotović was involved in cultural policy, an active movement for political change and changes in arts and culture. The effort to establish a new, democratic order in the 1990s brought together many intellectuals, artists, and non-governmental organizations. His contributions include being named Deputy Minister in the Ministry of Culture during Zoran Đinđić's term as prime minister. He waas also involved in the protection of Serbia's cultural heritage, especially in Kosovo following the arrival of the United Nations Interim Administration Mission in Kosovo.

== Books and monographs (selection) ==
General Sources:

- New Now, (Galerija “Pinki”, Zemun, 1982)
- Umetnost osamdesetih, Art of the Eighties (as co-author, Muzej savremene umetnosti, Beograd, 1983, p.p. 10–12)
- Vera Božičković Popović (Umetnički paviljon “Cvijeta Zuzorić”, Beograd, 1984)
- Svetomir Arsić-Basara (Umetnički paviljon “Cvijeta Zuzorić”, Beograd, 1984–1985)
- Sava Šumanović (Jugoslovenska galerija umetničkih dela, Beograd, 1986) ISBN 978-86-82857-01-3
- Darija Kačić, Dubravka Duba Sambolec, Aneta Svetieva (7th International Small Sculpture Exhibition of Budapest, Budapest, 1987, p.p. 138–139) ISBN 978-963-7402-07-4
- Slika i informacija 1945–1989, Srpska fotografija 1839–1989 (Picture and information 1945–1989, Serbian photography 1839–1989, as co-author, Galerija SANU, Beograd, 1991, p.p. 122–126)
- Mića Popović – Drawings, 1941–1988 (as editor, “Mrlješ”, Beograd, 1994)
- Zdravko Joksimovic (22nd Biennale of São Paulo, São Paulo, 1994, p.p. 291–292)
- Rezime, Summary (Muzej savremene umetnosti, Beograd, 1995–1996) ISBN 978-86-7101-094-8
- Dragoslav Djordjević (as editor, “Clio”, Beograd, 1996)
- A Saudade de Anica Vučetić (Museu de Arte Contemporanea da Universidade de São Paulo, São Paulo, 1995–1996)
- Sreten Stojanović (Jugoslovenska galerija umetničkih dela, Beograd, 1998)
- Umetnost i angažovanost devedesetih, Art and the involvement of the nineties (20 memorijal 'Nadežde Petrović', Umetnička galerija 'Nadežda Petrović', Čačak, 1998)
- Restoration of art, reconstruction criticism: criticism of art of the eighties (as co-author, The art at the end of the century I, “Clio”, Beograd, 1998, p.p. 117–139, 316–329)
- Vida Jocić – Apel za mir, Vida Jocic – Appeal for Peace (Centar za kulturnu dekontaminaciju, Beograd, 1999)
- Aktiver Widerstand, Zentrum für Kulturelle Dekontamination, Čedomir Vasiċ (as co-author,Dossier Serbien, Akademie der Künste, Berlin, 2000, p.p. 16–19, 32–34, 60)
- En fin (Galerie de l'UNESCO, Paris, 2000)
- Aktiver Widerstand, Zentrum für Kulturelle Dekontamination, Čedomir Vasiċ (as co-author, Dossier Serbien, Akademie der bildenden Künste, Wien, 2001, p.p. 16–19, 32–34, 60)
- Regionalno univerzalno, Regional univerzal (as co-author, Galerija savremene umetnosti, Pančevo, 2002, p.p. 49–74)
- Da Fattori a Morandi e La vie mediterranee dell'icona cristiana (preface, Narodni muzej, Beograd, 2001, La Collezione Grieco, Pinacoteca Provinciale, Bari, 2002, p. 7) ISBN 978-88-7329-017-9
- Živko Grozdanić Gera, (as co-author, Umetnička galerija “Nadežda Petrović”, Čačak, Centar za savremenu kulturu Konkordija, Vršac, Greelery Square Gallery, New York City, 2002, p.p. 50–53)
- Svetomir Arsić Basara, Or a foreword inevitably intended as an epilogue (preface, Srpska akademija nauka i umetnosti, Beograd, Narodna i univerzitetska biblioteka 'Ivo Andrić', Priština, 2004, p.p. 06-09) ISBN 978-86-7935-076-3
- Old Now (Kulturni centar Beograda, Beograd, 2004) ISBN 978-86-84235-15-4
- Čedomir Vasić, Red data Book (Umetnička galerija “Nadežda Petrović”, Čačak, 2004) ISBN 978-86-83783-08-3
- Led art 1993–2003 – Documents (as co-author, Multimedijalni centar LED ART, Novi Sad, 2004, p.p. 19, 20, 169–172, 195–198, 240, 241)
- Nagrada za umetnost 'Mića Popović', Award for art Mića Popović (as co-author, 10 godina Galerije Haos, Umetnički paviljon “Cvijeta Zuzorić”, Beograd, 2005, p.p. 53–60) ISBN 978-86-906951-0-2
- Nova slika, New Image Painting (“Clio”, Beograd, 2006) ISBN 978-86-7102-236-1
- Za bolji put Srbije, For a better way of Serbia (as co-author, Demokratska stranka, Centar resornih odbora, Beograd, 2006, p.p. 414–415, 671–674) ISBN 978-86-7856-001-9
- Madlena, (as co-author, Zepter internacional, Milan, Paris, 2006)
- Slobodan Trajković, Metamorfoze, Slobodan Trajkovic, Metamorphosis (Prodajna galerija “Beograd”, Beograd, 2007) ISBN 978-86-84393-43-4
- Evgenija Demnievska, Discours sur les utopies du modernisme (Umetnički paviljon “Cvijeta Zuzorić”, Beograd, 2007) ISBN 978-86-82765-45-5
- Nebojša Mitrić (as co-author, Spomen zbirka Pavla Beljanskog, Novi Sad, 2007, p. 117) ISBN 978-86-906563-6-3
- Vojin Stojić, život i delo, Vojin Stojić, life and work (as co-author, “Apostrof”, Beograd, 2007, p.p. 45–50) ISBN 978-86-7634-092-7
- Nežno i čvrsto, Gently and firmly (Galerija Zvono, Beograd, 2008)
- Milovan Destil Marković, DeStil Marković and the 'New Image' of the Eighties (as co-author, Umetnička galerija “Nadežda Petrović”, Čačak, 2008, p.p. 49–55) ISBN 978-86-83783-25-0
- Živko Grozdanić Gera, 'Meteorska kiša', Meteor Rain (as co-author, Simptomi singularizacije, Symptoms of singularisation, Biro za kulturu i komunikaciju, Vršac, 2008, p.p. 46–47) ISBN 978-86-907379-3-2
- Od 'džakova oraja' do održivosti javne umetnosti, From 'sacks of walnuts' to sustainability of public art (as co-author, Skulptura u urbanom prostoru, Sculpture in urban space, “Visart”, Novi Sad, 2008, p.p. 40–51) ISBN 978-86-911911-0-8
- Živojin Turinski – Works 1958–1967 (Kulturni centar Beograda, Beograd, 2009) ISBN 978-86-7996-033-7
- Umesto pogovora, Dosije Srbija – aktivizam devedesetih, Instead of the afterword, Dossier Serbia – activism of the nineties, (afterword Serbian edition in Collectivism after modernism, “University of Minnesota Press”, Minneapolis, 2007, ISBN 978-0-8166-4461-2, “Clio”, Beograd, 2010, p.p. 355–375) ISBN 978-86-7102-376-4
- Pažnja kritika, 50 godina Oktobarskog salona, Attention to criticism, 50 years of October Salon (Kulturni centar Beograda, Beograd, 2009, p.p. 334–336, 436–438, 438–440) ISBN 978-86-7996-035-1
- Ljubomir Erić, Kolekcija crteža, Art Collection (“Arhipelag”, Beograd, 2010) ISBN 978-86-86933-67-6
- Milena Jeftić Ničeva Kostić (ULUS, Beograd, 2010) ISBN 978-86-82765-62-2
- Pohvala stilu, Madlena, Decenije, Praise style, Madlena, Decades (as co-author, Zepter Book Word, Beograd, 2010, pp. 75–79) ISBN 978-86-7494-117-1
- Džafo, (as co-author, Muzej savremene likovne umetnosti Vojvodine, Novi Sad, 2011) ISBN 978-86-84773-80-9
- Above and Below, (preface, Slobodanka Stupar, Subjectil is Subjectil, Prodajna galerija “Beograd”, Belgrade, 2011) ISBN 978-86-6141-014-7
- Josif, (Josif Vidojković, “Intelekta”, Valjevo, 2011) ISBN 978-86-7072-056-5
- Nune and Magnet, (“Museum of Contemporary Art of Vojvodina”, Novi Sad, 2011) ISBN 978-86-84773-86-1
- Slobodanka Stupar, (“Sales Gallery 'Belgrade'”, Belgrade, 2013), ISBN 978-86-6141-047-5
- Odložba nije izložena (koautor), Kritičari su izabrali – Mrđan Bajić, Tahir Lušić, De Stil Marković, str.162-164; Kritičari na delu, str. 215–219; Kulturni centar Beograda, Beograd, The postponement was not presented (as co-author), Critics chose - Mrđan Bajić, Tahir Lušić, De Stil Marković, pp. 162–164; Critics in Action, pp. 215–219; Belgrade Cultural Center, Belgrade, 2019 ((ISBN 978-86-7996-245-4))

== Bibliography (selection) ==
General Sources:

=== Art ===
- Sintetički pejsaži, Synthetic Landscapes (Sveske, no. 11–12, Društvo istoričara umetnosti Srbije, Beograd, 1981, p.p 67–70)
- Otvorena umetnost, Open art (Politika Ekspres, Beograd, August 3, 1982, p. 8)
- Žestoki potezi bojom, Furious paint strokes (Književne novine, Beograd, September 9, 1982 p. 28)
- Beogradsko novo slikarstvo, Belgrade new painting (Pitanja, no. 1 Zagreb, January 1983, p.p 40–43)
- O dva posebna aspekta Postmodernizma, On two aspects of Postmodernism (Treći program, Radio Beograd, Beograd, August 25, 1983)
- Od tradicionalnog do Postmodernog, From Traditional to Postmodernism (Fotokino revija, no. 10, Beograd, October 1983, p.p. 11–12)
- Aux maniere fin de siècle (Treći program, Radio Beograd, Beograd, February 16, 1984)
- Umetnost osamdesetih: postmoderna u znaku osporavanja i/ili afirmacije, Art in eighties: postmodern challenges to the sign and/or affirmation (Treći program, Radio Beograd, Beograd, August 16, 1984)
- Slobodan Trajković, Širenje saznanja o jugoslovenskoj kulturi, Slobodan Trajkovic, Spreading knowledge of Yugoslav culture (Pregled), no. 226, Beograd, 1984, p.p. 88–92)
- Izmedju umetnosti i kiča, Between art and kitsch (Jedinstvo, Priština, May 16, 1985, p. 9)
- Beograd osamdesetih – Pigmalionova maska ili Edipovo karakter, Belgrade eighties – Pygmalion mask or character of Oedipus (Moment, no. 3–4, Beograd, 1985–1986, p.p. 13–16)
- Policentrične mutecije – novosti i ponavljanja, Polycentric mutations – News and repetition (Moment, no. 6–7, Beograd, 1986, p.p. 28–31)
- Bez nazova: geometrija, No name: Geometry (Moment, no. 6–7, Beograd, 1986, p.p. 76–77)
- Vladimir Veličković (Umetnost 86, no. 68–69, new series 1–2, Beograd, 1987, p.p. 4–5)
- Fotografija i savremena umetnost, (pogled iz osamdesetih), Photography and contemporary art, (A view from the eighties) (Braničevo, no. 5, Požarevac, 1987, p.p. 72–74)
- Verbumprogram AG, (Moment, no. 10, Beograd, 1988, p.p. 91–92)
- Skulptura identiteta: Jedan primer – Mrdjan Bajić, Sculpture of identity: An example – Mrdjan Bajic (Moment, no. 13, Beograd, 1989, p.p. 23–24)
- Mladi beogradski skulptori, Young Belgrade sculptors (Moment, no. 18, Beograd, 1990, p. 91)
- Materialità – Geometry field (Moment, no. 21, Beograd, 1991, p. 92)
- Forma occidit (Moment, no. 22, Beograd, 1991, p. 89)
- Istočna paradigma u Beogradu, Eastern paradigm in Belgrade (Kulture istoka, no. 28, Beograd, April–July 1991, p. 75)
- Nacionalna tema u savremenom srpskom slikarstvu – Uvod, National issue in contemporary Serbian painting – Introduction (Projeka(r), no. 3, Novi Sad, July 1994, p.p. 46–49)
- Na iskustvima memorije, Experiences of Memory (Politika, Beograd, June 10, 1995, p. 15)
- Pametni mediji, Smart Media (Politika, Beograd, November 25, 1995, p. 15)
- Od mekog pisam do stroge misli, From soft letters to rigid thinking (Treći program, no. 107–108, Radio Beograd, Beograd, 1996, p.p. 47–60)
- Postmoderni dijalog, Postmodern dialogue (Treći program, Radio Beograd, August 9, Beograd, 1996)
- Pozni modernizam, Late modernism (Košava, no. 34–35, Vršac, December 1997 p.p. 63–64)
- Marina Abramović, „Fin de siecle“ – Balkan variant (Naša borba, Beograd, December 6 to 7, 1997, p. 17)
- Quadrifolium criticus (Danas, Beograd, December 5 to 6, 1998, p. 10)
- Prostorni narativi, Spatial Narratives (Jedinstvo, Priština, December 14, 1998)
- Jezik novo stvaralaštva, Language of New Creativity (Jedinstvo, Priština, December 24 to 25, 1998, p. 11)
- Art Advertising (Danas, Beograd, January 19, 1999, p. 11)
- Virtual crossover, (Republika, no. 226, Beograd, December 1 to 15, 1999, p. 16)
- Glasovi novog veka, Voices of the New Century (Književne novine, no. 7, war issue, Beograd, June 4, 1999, p. 11)
- Sedam teza o novoj srpskoj skulpturi, Seven theses of recent Serbian sculpture (Treći program, Radio Beograd, March 17, Beograd, 2000)
- Strastvena pažnja kritičara, Passionate critical attention (Treći program, no. 111, Radio Beograd, Beograd, 2001, p.p. 29–38)
- Mirko Ilić (Treći program, Radio Beograd, March 11, Beograd, 2005)
- Neomodernističke utopije, Neo-modernist utopia (Politika, Beograd, April 9, 2005, p. 13)
- O normalnosti – umetnost u Srbiji 1989–2001, On Normality – Art in Serbia 1989–2001 (Treći program, Radio Beograd, January 24, Beograd, 2006)
- Bernar Deloš: ’Virtuelni muzej’, Bernard Deloche, Le musée virtuel (Treći program, Radio Beograd, July 25, Beograd, 2006)
- Vreme imaginarnih muzeja, Time of Imaginary Museum (Politika, Beograd, November 23, 2006, p. 11)
- Rasap umetnosti, rasap kritike: Kritika umetnosti devedesetih, Teze za tekst,, Dissolution of Art, Dissolution of Criticism: Art Criticism in the Nineties, Guidelines for a text (Anomalia, no. 2, Novi Sad, 2007, p.p. 137–142)
- Umetnost dezorijentacije, Arts of disorientation (Politika, Beograd, May 5, 2007, p. 07)
- Slikarstvo surovosti, Painting of brutality (Politika, Beograd, April 30, 2007, p.p. 1–2)
- Ideja projekta i posmoderna paradigma, The idea of the project and Postmodern paradigm (Treći program, Radio Beograd, no. 133–134, Beograd, 2007, p.p. 415–421)
- Dimenzioni radovi, Dimensional Works (Treći program, Radio Beograd, June 13, Beograd, 2008)
- De Stil Marković i Novo slikarstvo osamdesetih I-III, De Stil Marković and New Image Painting of Eighties I-III (Treći program, Radio Beograd, Beograd, July 16 to 18, 2008)
- Tumačenje enformela, Branko Protić, dela 1956–1966, Interpretation of informel, Branko Protić, works 1956–1966 (Treći program, no. 137–138, Radio Beograd, Beograd, 2008, p.p. 440–444)
- Andre Gob and Noemi Druge, Museology (Treći program, Radio Beograd, Beograd, April 15, 2009)
- Originalno kao neostvareni cilj umetnosti, Originally as an unfulfilled goal of art (Treći program, no. 139–140, Radio Beograd, Beograd, 2009, pp. 191–199)
- Muzejska institucija, Museum institution (Treći program, no. 141–142, Radio Beograd, Beograd, 2010, p.p. 517–522)
- Četiri muzejska predmeta, Four museum objects (Treći program, Radio Beograd, Beograd, December 13, 2010)

=== Cultural policy ===
- Umetnost – politika – ideologija, Art – politics – ideology (Moment, no. 18, Beograd, 1990, p. 55–57)
- Evropski govoriti, European speaking (Vreme umetnosti, no. 1, September Beograd, 1994, p. 1)
- Muzej Savremene umetnosti u raljam levog i desnog totalitarizma, Kultura vlasti, Index smena i zabrana I, Museum of Contemporary Art in the arms of left and right totalitarianism, The culture of government, and prohibition of dismissal, Index I (Radio B92, Beograd, 1994, p.p. 43–47)
- Ratna muzeologija, War museology (Vreme umetnosti, no. 6, Beograd, February 1995, p. 1)
- Kultura jeste pobuna, Culture is a rebellion (Demokratija, Beograd, January 5, 1997, p. 9)
- Beograd: barikade za bodočnost (Razgledi, Ljubljana, February 5, 1997 p.p. 10–11)
- Rasulo u Muzeju savremene umetnosti, Chaos at the Museum of Contemporary Art (Demokratija, Beograd, February 5, 1997, p. 8)
- Opozorila novi mestni oblasti (Delo, Ljubljana, March 28, 1997)
- Umetnost i angažovanost, Art and commitment (Republika, no. 181, Beograd, February 1–15, 1997, p. 13)
- Arti i rezistenës (Zeri, Priština, June 14, 1997, p. 26)
- Gjurmë (M, no. 6-7, Priština, 1997, p.p. 395–401)
- Umetnost Druge Srbije, Art of the Second Serbia (Razgledi-Delo, Ljubljana, March 3, 1998, p. 21)
- Kelneri i sobarice Njihovog režima, Waiters and chambermaids of Their regime (Naša borba, August 12, Beograde, 1998, p. 7)
- Kulturno strančarenje, Cultural factions (Republika, no. 197, September 16–30, Beograd, 1998, p.p. 24–25)
- Off-artistic scene (Danas, Beograd, September 18, 1999, p. 13)
- Individualna kultura protesta, Individual culture of protest (Prava čoveka, Leskovac, November 9, 1999, p. 15)
- Proti državi kiča (Delo, Ljubljana, December 1, 1999, p. 9)
- Sistematski organizovana nebriga, Systematically organized neglect (Danas, Beograd, April 7, 2000, p. 6)
- Sudjenje umetničkim slobodama, The trial of artistic freedom (Republika, no. 236-237, Beograd, May 1–31, 2000, p. 18)
- Umetnost u raljama dnevne politike, Art in the jaws of daily politics (Republika, no. 245, Beograd, September 16–30, 2000, p. 24)
- Kulturna Yu alternativa – represija i izazovi, Cultural YU alternative – Repression and Challenges (Identitet, no.45, Zagreb, October 2000, p. 39)
- Dosije Srbija, Dossie Serbia (Treći program, Radio Beograd, November 28, Beograd, 2000)
- Kulturna politika i kulturna strategija, Cultural Policy and Cultural Strategy (Republika, no. 250, December 1–15, Beograd, 2000, p.p. 9–10)
- Merenje realnosti devedesetih, Measuring the reality of the nineties (Politika, January 13, Beograd, 2001, p. 5)
- Baština kao obaveza nacionalne politike, Heritage as a national policy commitments (Politika, April 21, Beograd, 2001, p. 5)
- Neka pitanja (nove) kulturne politike, Some questions of (new) cultural policy (Moment, new series, no. 1, Pančevo, January 2003, p.p. 2–3)
- Odbrana napadnute umetnosti, The defense of attacked Arts (Treći program, no. 121-122, Radio Beograd, Beograd, 2004, p.p. 31–35)
- Predvodnik revolucionarnih obrata, Leader of the revolutionary reversal (Treći program, no. 123-124, Radio Beograd, Beograd, 2004, p.p. 225–230)
- Zaštita kulturne baštine na Kosovu i Metohiji, Protection of cultural heritage on Kosovo and Metoh (Treći program, no. 125-126, Radio Beograd, Beograd, 2005, p.p. 427–441)
- Kulturna politika i tranzicija I-VIII, Cultural policy and the transition I-VIII (Treći program, Radio Beograd, Beograd, 2005–2006)
- Očuvanje kulturne baštine, Preservation of cultural heritage (Leskovački zbornik, XLVII, Leskovac, May 2007, p.p. 19–28)
- Zaštita nezaštićenog, Privacy unprotected (Evropa, Beograd, September 27, 2007, p.p. 42–45)
- Evropski govoriti (drugi put), European speaking (second time) (Evropa, Beograd, November 1, 2007, p.p. 24–25)
- Slika politike – kulturno-politička hronika devedesetih, Image of politics – a cultural-political chronicle of the nineties (Treći Program, Radio Beograd, Beograd, September 12, 2009)

=== International art ===
- Tatljinov spomenik Trećoj internacionali, Tatlin's The Monument to the Third International (Tatlin's Tower) (3+4, Beograd, 1978, p.p. 26–31)
- Ideja i praksa ruskog konstruktivizma, The idea and practice of Russian Constructivism (Abstract Art (Delo, Beograd, June to July 1979, pp. 114–132)
- Étienne-Jules Marey Fotografija pokreta, Pictures of Movement (Student, Beograd, March 30, 1983, p. 14)
- Giulio Carlo Argan: Studije o modernoj umetnosti, Studies on modern art (Treći program), Radio Beograd, Beograd, April 19, 1983)
- Bill Brandt, Fotografije, Photos (Treći program, Radio Beograd, Beograd, Jule 6, 1983)
- Majstori svetskog slikarstva iz kolekcije dr Armana Hamera, Masters of world painting from the collection of Dr. Armand Hammer (Treći program, Radio Beograd, Beograd, October 27, 1983)
- William Klein (Moment, no. 1, Beograd, 1984, p. 62)
- Emilio Vedova (Moment, no. 1, Beograd, 1984, p.p. 55–56)
- Hans Hartung (Treći program, Radio Beograd, Beograd, January 1, 1984)
- Max Beckmann (Treći program, Radio Beograd, Beograd, November 1984)
- Renato Guttuso (Treći program, Radio Beograd, Beograd, November 1984)
- Ivan Meštrović, sculptures 1898–1918 (Sveske, no. 16, Društvo istoričara umetnosti Srbije, Beograd, 1985, p.p. 138–139)
- Man Ray (Treći program, Radio Beograd, Beograd, March 1985)
- Jan Dibbets (Treći program, Radio Beograd, Beograd, May 1985)
- Georges Braque (Treći program, Radio Beograd, Beograd, May 1985)
- August Sander (Fotokino revija, no. 11-12, Beograd, 1985, p.p. 12–13)
- Max Beckmann, graphics 1911–1946 (Sveske, no. 16, Društvo istoričara umetnosti Srbije, Beograd, 1985, p. 130)
- Renato Guttuso, graphics (Sveske, no. 16, Društvo istoričara umetnosti Srbije, Beograd, 1985, p. 131)
- Man Ray – Fotografije nove vizije vremena, Photos of a new vision of time (Moment, no. 5, Beograd, 1986, p. 15–16)
- Julio González (Moment, no. 5, Beograd, 1986, p.p. 49–50)
- Georg Baselitz (Moment, no. 6-7, Beograd, 1986, p.p. 34–35)
- Danski umetnici grupe COBRA, Danish artists from group COBRA (Sveske, no. 18, Društvo istoričara umetnosti Srbije, Beograd, 1987, p. 151)
- Max Bill (Moment, no. 8, Beograd, 1987, p.p. 60–61)
- Himna finskom graditeljstvu, Anthem Finnish architecture (Jedinstvo, Priština, April 21, 1987, p. 9)
- Robert Mapplethorpe (Moment, no. 9, Beograd, 1988, p. 30)
- Hans Hartung (Umetnost 87, no. 70-71-72, new series 3-4-5, Beograd, 1988, p.p. 32–33)
- Vizuelni poziv Barija Flanagana, Visual call of Barry Flanagan (Moment, no. 10, Beograd, 1988, p.p. 42–43)
- Dan Reisinger: Spisi o vatri, Writings on fire (Treći program, Radio Beograd, Beograd, January 1989)
- Tatljinov Spomenik i nova umetnost, Tatlin's Tower and the new art (Treći program, Radio Beograd, Beograd, April 1989)
- Christian Attersee (Moment, no. 17, Beograd, 1990, p.p. 38–40)
- Le Corbusier (Treći program, Radio Beograd, Beograd, October 1990)
- Urbane predstave Kita Heringa, Urban mages of Keith Haring (Vreme, Beograd, July 4, 1994, p. 47)
- Nemačka propagandna fotografija 1925–1988, Germany advertising photogrfaphy 1925–1988 (Treći program, Radio Beograd, Beograd, May 1995)
- Otvoreno delo Marsela Dišana, Open Work of Marcel Duchamp (Borba, Beograd, July 113-14, 1996, p. 23)
- Manifesta I (Treći program, Radio Beograd, Beograd, September 2, 1996)
- Advertising (Danas, Beograd, January 19, 1999, p. 11)
- Novi Muzej savremene umetnosti u Njujorku, The new Museum of Modern Art in New York City (Naša borba, Beograd, 1998)
- Stedelijk Museum (Treći program, Radio Beograd, December 12, Beograd, 2004)
- Dan Reisinger (Treći program, Radio Beograd, September 9, Beograd, 2005)
- Christian Attersee (Treći program, Radio Beograd, Beograd, June 30, 2006)
- Giulio Carlo Argan, Achille Bonito Oliva: 'Moderna umetnost 1770-1970-2000', Modern art 1770-1970-2000 (Treći program, Radio Beograd, Beograd, September 1, 2006)
- Dezorijetacija – mladi britanski umetnici I-III, Disorientation – Young British Artists I-III (Treći program, Radio Beograd, Beograd, September 29 to October 31, 2009)

== Curatorial exhibitions (selection) ==
General sources

- New Now (Galerija “Pinki”, Beograd, May to June 1982)
- Umetnost osamdesetih, The art of the eighties (as co-author, Muzej savremene umetnosti, Beograd, June to August 1983)
- Jugoslavian Nykytaidetta (as co-author, Alvar Aalto museet, Oslo, April 1984)
- Jugoslavisk Nutidskonst (as co-author, Taidehalli, Helsinki, May 1984)
- 7 th International Small Sculpture Exhibition of Budapest (Palace of Exhibitions, Budapest, November to December 1987) ISBN 978-963-7402-07-4
- Slika i informacija 1945–1989, Picture and information 1945–1989 (Galerija SANU, Beograd, January to March 1991)
- 22nd Sao Paulo Biennale (São Paulo, October to December 1994)
- Rezime, Summary (Muzej savremene umetnosti, Beograd, 1995–1996) ISBN 978-86-7101-094-8
- Sava Šumanović (Jugoslovenska galerija umetničkih dela, Beograd, July to August 1996) ISBN 978-86-82857-01-3
- Pėrtej (as co-author, Centar za kulturnu dekontaminaciju, Beograd, April 1997)
- Sreten Stojanović (Jugoslovenska galerija umetničkih dela, Beograd, 1998)
- Umetnost i angažovanost devedesetih, Art and the involvement of the nineties (20 memorijal “Nadežde Petrović”, Umetnička galerija “Nadežda Petrović”, Čačak, 1998)
- Vida Jocić, Apel za mir, Appeal for Peace (Centar za kulturnu dekontaminaciju, Beograd, April 1999)
- Glasovi novog veka, Voices of the New Century (Galerija Haos, Beograd, May to June 1999) ISBN 978-86-906951-0-2
- Dossier Serbien (as co-author, Akademie der Künste, Berlin, November to December 2000)
- En fin (Galerie de l'UNESCO, Paris, December 2000)
- Dossier Serbien (as co-author, Akademie der Bildenden Künste, Wien, January to February 2001)
- Old Now (Likovna galerija Kulturnog centra Beograda, Beograd, January 2004) ISBN 978-86-84235-15-4
- Živojin Turinski – Works 1958–1967, (as co-author, Likovna galerija Kulturnog centra Beograda, Beograd, September 2009) ISBN 978-86-7996-033-7

== Awards ==
Co-founder

- 1992: Belgrade, Award Lazar Trifunović (for the best theoretical work, art critic or a book in the field of art and visual creativity)
- 1997: Belgrade, Award Mića Popović (for individuals who are critical active as artists and engaged intellectuals)

Winner

- 2000: Belgrade, Award Lazar Trifunović for fundamental work in art criticism and the text in the catalog, 'En fin', held at the Gallery of UNESCO, Paris, 1999

== Membership ==
- 1986: International Association of Art Critics (AICA)
