= Tafil Musović =

- Born: Tafil Musović; 1950; Kosovo, SFR Yugoslavia
- Known for: Painter

Tafil Musović (born 1950) is a painter who lives and works in Amsterdam, Netherlands, since 1988. He was born in Yugoslavia, in the province of Kosovo, and lived in Belgrade, the capital, from 1952. In his last years in Yugoslavia, he had an atelier in Zemun until 1988.

== Biography ==
Musović was born in Mlečane, a village near Mališevo in the province of Kosovo, Yugoslavia. He graduated from the Academy of Fine Art in Belgrade (1969–1974), where he also did his postgraduate studies (1977–1979).

He won the Prize for the Best Drawings on the Academy of Fine Arts in Belgrade, 1970, and the Prize for the best exhibition of 1997 in Belgrade, given by TV/Radio Studio B. Basisstipendium - Fonds voor Beeldende kunsten, 1996, 2000, 2004, 2008

== Art ==
Tafil Musović appeared on the art scene at the time of change styling concepts in fine art from figuration to expression of new wave at the beginning of the 1980s. But first appearances showed a distinct authorial personality that is imposed not only in the professional community but also the wider population of art devotee. After moving to Amsterdam, basically kept constructed visual language, but it has completed the European and specific Dutch painting tradition that is well understood and creatively absorbed in his work. Today Musović is remained committed to figuratives and portraits, but now with an in-depth review dimensions of artistic tradition.

== Exhibitions (solo) ==
- 1977 Galerija grafickog kolektiva, Belgrade
- 1978 National Museum, Leskovac
- 1979 Galerija Doma omladine, Belgrade
- 1982 Galerija Kolarcevog narodnog univerziteta, Belgrade
- 1982 Galerija Kolarcevog narodnog univerziteta, Belgrade
- 1984 Galerija Studentskog kulturnog centra, Belgrade
- 1986 Salon Muzeja savremene umetnosti, Belgrade
- 1987 Happy Gallery, Belgrade
- 1992 Galerie de Blauwe Leuning, The Hague
- 1995 Galerie de Schone Kunsten, Haarlem
- 1995 Galerie de Blauwe Leuning, The Hague
- 1997 Galerie de Schone Kunsten, Haarlem
- 1997 Galerija ULUS, Belgrade
- 1998 Galerie de Blauwe Leuning, The Hague
- 1998 Galerija Fakulteta likovnih umetnosti, Belgrade
- 1999 De Annex, Galerie Maria Chailloux, Amsterdam
- 2001 Galerie Maria Chailloux, Amsterdam
- 2002 Galerie Jacoba Wijk, Groningen
- 2003 Wendingen, Amstelkerk, Amsterdam
- 2003 Galerija grafickog kolektiva, Belgrade
- 2005 RC de Ruimte, IJmuiden
- 2005 RC de Ruimte, IJmuiden
- 2006 RC de Ruimte, IJmuiden
- 2007 Galerie 59, van Eeghenstraat 59-1, Amsterdam
- 2008 RC de Ruimte, IJmuiden
- 2008 Galerija grafickog kolektiva, Belgrade
- 2008 Art Pavillon “Cvijeta Zuzoric”, Retrospective 1978 - 2008, Belgrade
- 2009 Ververs modern art gallery, Amsterdam
- 2009 Centre culturel de Serbie, Paris
- 2010 Galerija grafickog kolektiva, Belgrade

== Bibliography ==
- 1978 Zdravko Vučinić, Galerija Natodnog muzeja, (catalogue), Leskovac
- 1982 Jerko Denegri, Galerija Kolarčeve zadužbine, (catalogue), Belgrade
- 1982 Jovan Despotović, Žestoki potezi bojom - Tafil Musović, Književne novine, 9. decembre, Belgrade
- 1984 Lidija Mernik, Galerija SKC, (catalogue), Belgrade
- 1986 Mladen Kozomara, Salon Muzeja savremene umetnosti, (catalogue), Belgrade
- 1986 Jovan Despotović, Značenje scene, Meaning of scene, Jedinstvo, 29 novembre, Priština
- 1987 Dragica Vukadinović, Srećna galerija SKS, (catalogue), Belgrade
- 1995 Onno Groustra: Haarlems Dagblad, 11 maart 1995 Landschappelijke zelfportretten, Amsterdam
- 1997 Zoran Gavrić, Galerija ULUS, (catalogue), Belgrade
- 1997 Lidija Merenik: Intervju 04 jul 97 Slikarstvo velikog nemira, Belgrade
- 1997 Mihailo Kandić: Likovni Život, June 1997 Tafil Musović, The Paintings of, Belgrade
- 1997 Bas Donker van Heel: Haarlems Dagblad, 23 januari 1997 Schone Kunsten etaleert eigenzinnige tekenaars, Amsterdam
- 1998 Hans Dekkers: Destroyed Gardens (on the series: The Expulsion from Paradise), (catalogue), Amsterdam
- 1998 Patty Wageman, (catalogue), Amsterdam
- 2001 Milena Marjanović: BLIC, Intervju 19 mar 2001 Najteže mi pada diskriminacija, Belgrade
- 2001 Marina Martić: Place/ Time/ Identity (on the series: Max Beckmann in Amsterdam), (catalogue), Amsterdam
- 2002 Milena Marjanović: BLIC, Intervju 28 feb 2002 Umetnik nije sveta krava, Belgrade
- 2002 Lidija Merenik: A conversation with Uccello, (on the series: Saint George and the Dragon), (catalogue), Amsterdam
- 2002 Milena Marjanović: Dear Tafil (on the series: Saint George and the Dragon), (catalogue), Amsterdam
- 2002 Patty Wageman: A world of good and evil (on the series: Saint George and the Dragon), (catalogue), Amsterdam
- 2004 Vojislav Stojanović, (monography), Belgrade
- 2006 Wim de Wagt: Haarlems Dagblad, 24 mei 2006 Alsof er iemand op een trom spuugde, Haarlem
- 2008 Liljana Ćinkul, (catalogue), Belgrade
- 2008 Milena Marjanović, Qui non ha luogo il Santo Volto, (catalogue), Belgrade
- 2008 René Huigen, Drawing is Speaking and Writing at the Same Time, (catalogue), Belgrade
- 2008 On Retrospective 1978 - 2008, Art Pavillon “Cvijeta Zuzoric” and Exhibition in Galerija grafickog kolektiva, Belgrade
- 2010 Tafil Musović, works on paper, (monography), Galerija Grafički kolektiv, Belgrade

== Sources ==
- http://www.tafilmusovic.nl
- http://www.novosti.rs/vesti/kultura.71.html:418916-Tafil-Musovic-Slikam-da-bih-opstao
- Documentation of the Museum of Contemporary Art, Belgrade
- Tafil, (monograph), ULUS, Belgrade, 2008 ISBN 978-86-82765-49-3
