= Platičevo =

Platičevo Платичево (Serbian)
- Village (Selo)
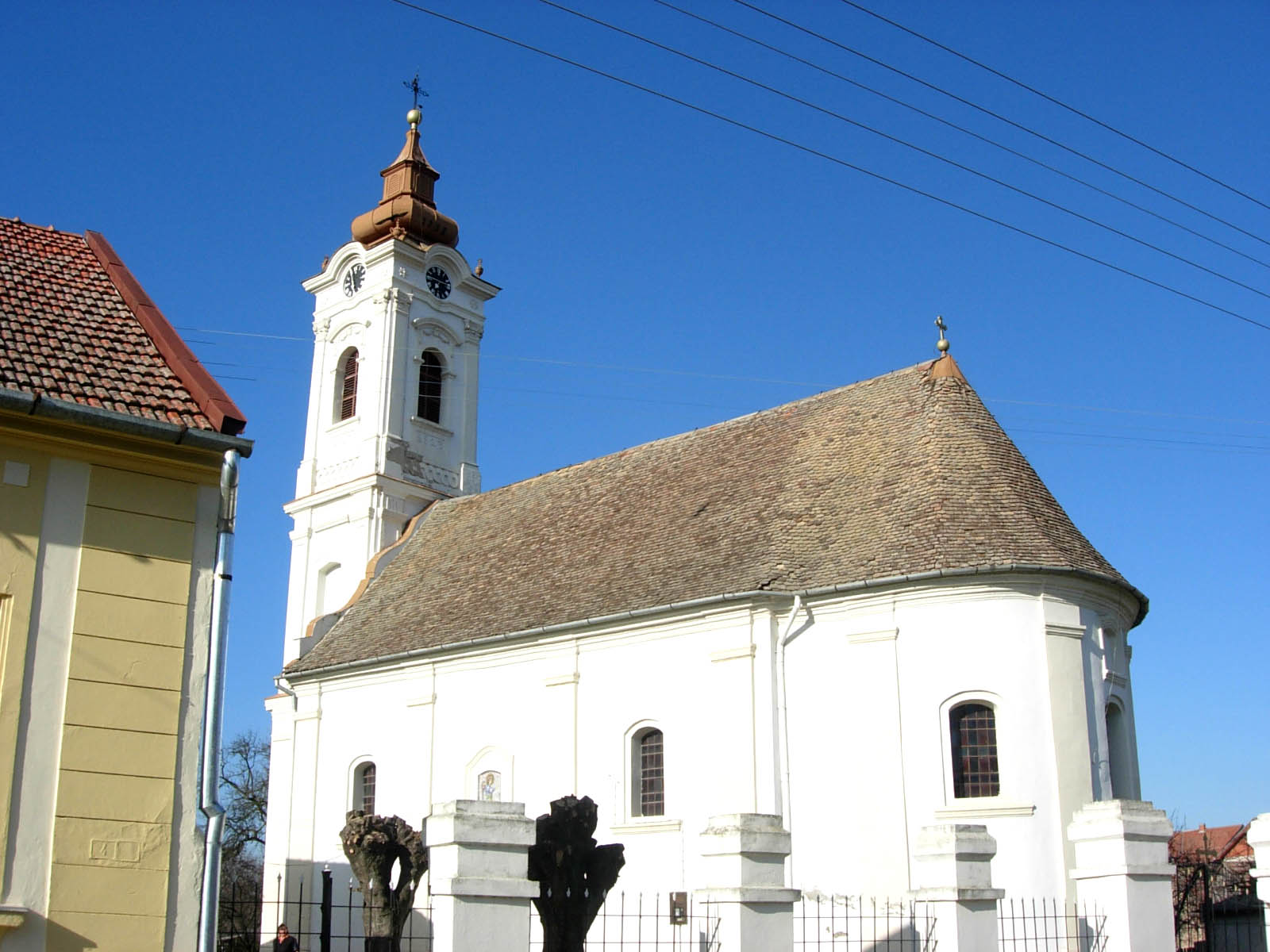
- The Orthodox church.

- Location within Vojvodina Location within Serbia Location within Europe
- Coordinates: 44°49′N 19°48′E
- Country: Serbia
- Province: Vojvodina
- Region: Syrmia
- District: Srem
- Municipality: Ruma

Population (2002)
  - Total: 2,760
- Time zone: UTC+1 (CET)
  - Summer (DST): UTC+2 (CEST)

Platičevo (Serbian Cyrillic: Платичево) is a village in Serbia. It is located in the Ruma municipality, in the Srem District, Vojvodina province. The village has a Serb ethnic majority and its population numbering 2,760 people (2002 census).

== Historical population ==
- 1961: 2,726
- 1971: 2,824
- 1981: 2,812
- 1991: 2,809

== See also ==
- List of places in Serbia
- List of cities, towns and villages in Vojvodina
