= Jerko Ješa Denegri =

Serbian art historian and art critic

Jerko "Ješa" Denegri
- Born: Jerko Denegri; 5 September 1936 (age 88); Split, Littoral Banovina, Kingdom of Yugoslavia
- Occupation(s): Art Historian and Art Critics

Jerko "Ješa" Denegri (Serbian Cyrillic: Јерко "Јеша" Денегри, pronounced [jerko jeʃa deneɡri]) is a Serbian art historian and art critic who lives in Belgrade, Serbia.

== Biography ==
He was born on 5 September 1936 in Split, Kingdom of Yugoslavia, now Croatia. Graduated on University of Belgrade Faculty of Philosophy at the Department of Art History where he defended his PhD thesis. He was a curator at the Museum of Contemporary Art (Belgrade) from 1965 to 1991 and a professor on Belgrade Faculty of Philosophy from 1991 to 2007 at the Department of Art History. He wrote more than 3000 theoretical texts, essays, critics about modern, contemporary and actual art in daily, weekly and monthly periodicals as such as in specialized journals. Author of many Yugoslav and Serbian visual art exhibitions and a monograph and catalog preface of their most important protagonists. He was a commissioner on the Yugoslav Biennial of Young Artists in Paris Centre Pompidou, and Venice Biennial. He initiated and was the editor and chief editor of several professional journals: The Art (Belgrade), Architecture-Urbanism (Belgrade), Moment (Gornji Milanovac - Belgrade), Projeka(r)t (Novi Sad) etc.

He is the member of International Association of Art Critics (AICA).
