= Slobodan Trajković =

Serbian artist

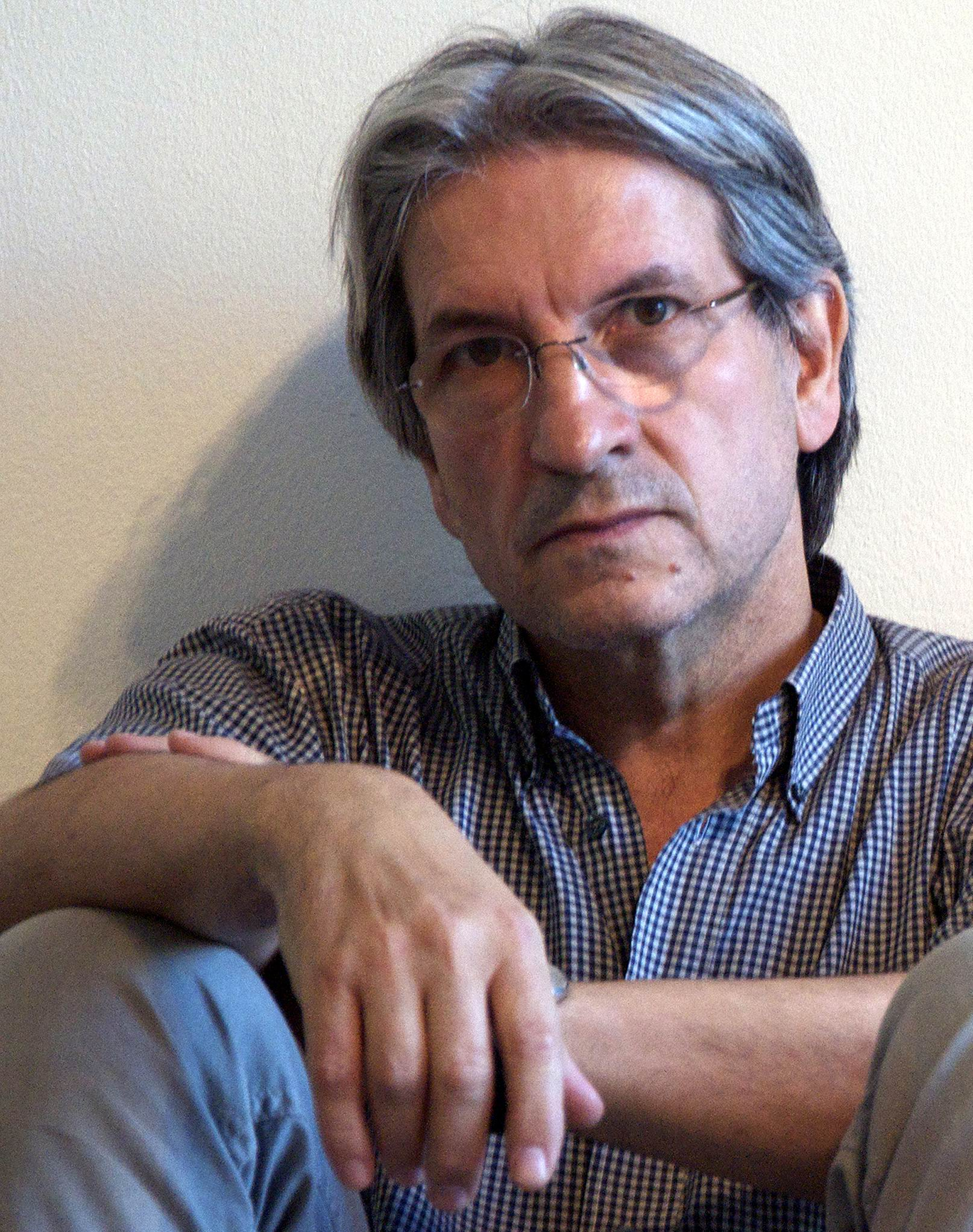
- Born: 1954 (age 71–72); Priština, SFR Yugoslavia
- Known for: Visual artist

Slobodan Trajković (Serbian Cyrillic: Слободан Трајковић; born 1954) is a Serbian visual artist. He began his career in the late 1970s.

== Biography ==
Trajković was born in 1954 in Pristina, Yugoslavia. In the 1980s Slobodan Trajković rejected the academic language of the arts and began creating spatial works and installations belonging to the then current reversal art.

Trajković later abandoned the idea of image-building, moving towards flat representation of color organized in a figurative and abstract mix, which tended to highly variable "chromatic aggression". For many years he lived in New York City where the school of abstract art is still an active inspiration.

Trajković then moved to London and returned to the European tradition lacking in the New World. He again explored dialectics of form: organic-artificial, colorful-achromatic (or monochrome), rough-gentle, hard-fragile. He produces drawings, objects, sculptures, installations, two-dimensional and three-dimensional works in various materials.
