= Dragičević =

Dragičević (Serbian Cyrillic: Драгичевић) is a South Slavic surname. Notable people with the surname include:

- Boris Dragičević (born 1958), Croatian handball player and coach
- David Dragičević (1997–2018), Bosnian man who died under suspicious circumstances
- Georg Dragičević (1890–1980), Croatian soldier
- Ivan Dragičević (born 1981), Serbian football defender
- Marc Dragicevic (born 1981), Australian rules footballer
- Marko Dragičević (born 1976), Croatian rower
- Mate Dragičević (born 1979), Croatian football striker
- Milorad Dragićević (1904–1975), Serbian football player
- Milutin Dragićević (born 1983), Serbian handball player
- Oliver Dragicevic (born 2007), Australian footballer
- Pavao Dragičević (1694–1773), Bosnian Franciscan friar and bishop
- Prvoslav Dragićević (1914–1974), Serbian football manager and player
- Radislav Dragićević (born 1971), Montenegrin football midfielder
- Rajna Dragićević, Serbian linguist, lexicologist and lexicographer
- Nikola Dragičević (born 1988), Serbian football player
- Strahinja Dragićević (born 1986), Serbian basketball player
- Tadija Dragićević (born 1986), Serbian basketball player, twin brother of Strahinja
- Tamara Dragičević (born 1989), Serbian actress and model
- Vladimir Dragičević (born 1986), Montenegrin basketball player
- Zdravko Dragićević (born 1986), Montenegrin football player

== See also ==
- Dragić
- Dragović
- Dragojević
