= Dragoje =

Dragoje (Cyrillic: Драгоје) is a masculine given name of Slavic origin. It may refer to:

- Dragoje Leković (born 1967), retired football goalkeeper

== See also ==
- Dragojević, a surname
- Dragojevići, a village
- Dragojevac (disambiguation)
