= Dragić =

Dragić (Cyrillic: Драгић) is a South Slavic surname. Notable people with the surname include:

- Dalibor Dragić (born 1972), Bosnian Serb footballer
- Dragan Dragić (born 1980), Serbian politician
- Goran Dragić (born 1986), Slovenian basketball player for the Milwaukee Bucks, Zoran's brother
- Labud Dragić (born 1954), Serbian writer of Montenegrin origin
- Mirjana Lehner Dragić (born 1936), Serbian painter
- Nedeljko Dragić (born 1936), Croatian animator
- Predrag Dragić (1945–2012), Serbian writer
- Tanja Dragić (born 1991), Serbian Paralympic athlete
- Zoran Dragić (born 1989), Slovenian basketball player for the Anadolu Efes, Goran's brother

== See also ==
- Dragičević
- Dragović
- Dragojević
