= Milan Minić =

Milan Minić is the name of:

- Milan Minić (basketball) (born 1954), Serbian basketball coach
- Milan Minić (architect) (1899–1961), Serbian architect and painter
