= Mihailo Stošović =

Serbian sculptor (born 1971)

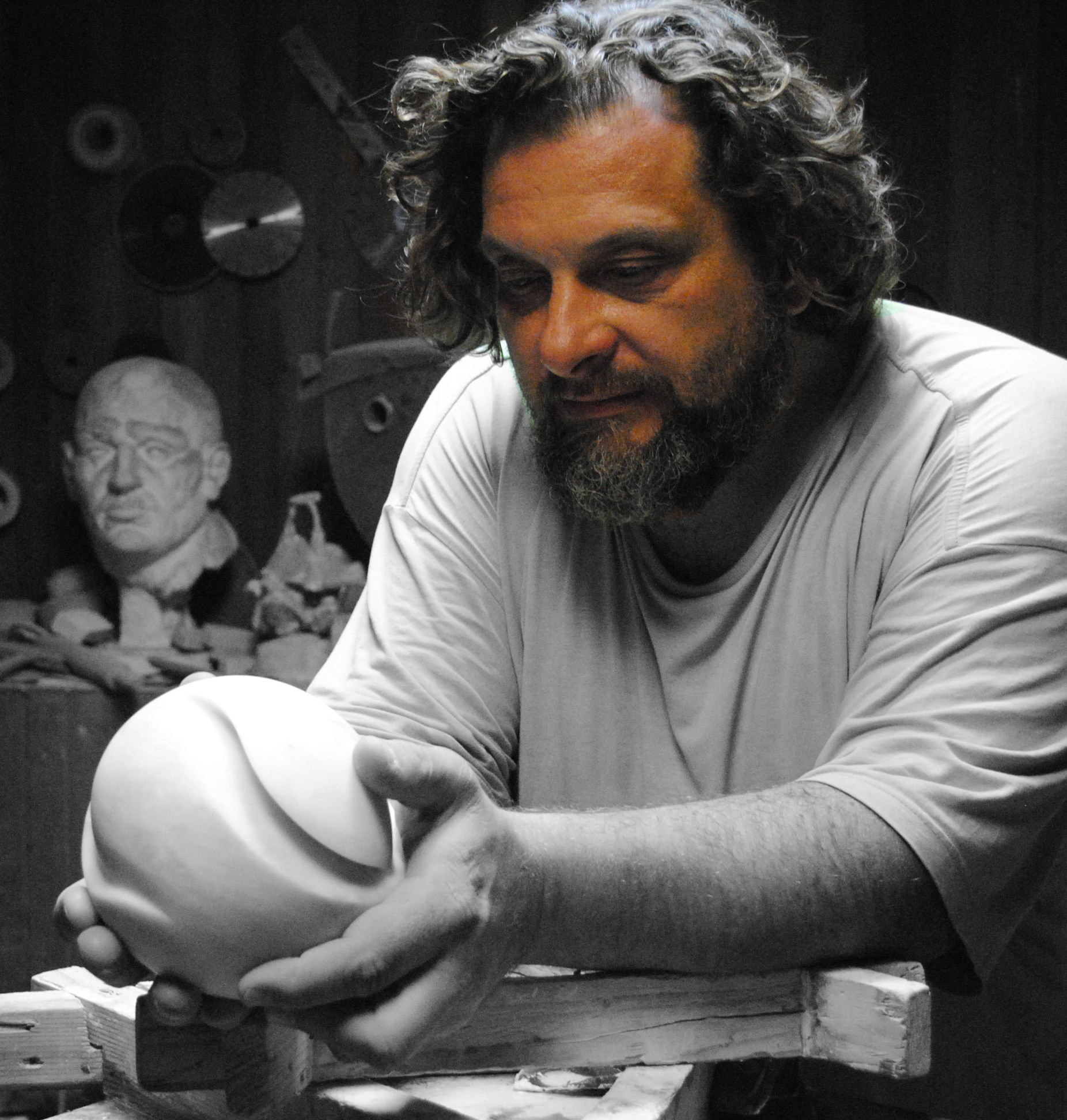
- Born: 23 April 1971 (age 55); Belgrade, SR Serbia, SFR Yugoslavia
- Education: University of Arts in Belgrade
- Known for: Sculpture

Mihailo Stošović (Serbian Cyrillic: Михаило Стошовић, Belgrade, 1971) is a Serbian sculptor, also known as Vajar Beogradski.

== Life ==
Stošović was born, on 23 April 1971 in Belgrade, into a well-known family with enviable tradition in stone processing. He is professionally engaged in sculpting since 2007. He graduated from the Faculty of Applied Arts in Belgrade, Department of Conservation and Restoration of the sculpture in the class of prof. Slobodan Savić. Section Committee President of ULUPUDS since 2014. Professor of sculpture at the Center for Art Education "Šumatovačka".

He had many solo exhibitions and participated in dozens of group of international and domestic exhibitions and symposiums. Mihailo's artworks are found in public spaces and private collections in Serbia, Russia, Israel, Switzerland, Slovenia, and Montenegro.

He is a member of ULUS (Association Des Arts Plastiques De Serbie); ULUPUDS (Applied Artists and Designers Association of Serbia); and UVS (Sculptor Association of Serbia) with the status of an independent artist. Stošović lives and works in Belgrade.

Since 2011, he actively participates in projects such as "12+", "Annual exhibition of Serbian sculptors" and others, together with sculptors from various Belgrade associations. His association colleagues include Professor Zdravko Milinkovic, Vuk Ljubisavljević, Ivan Gračner, Mihailo Gerun, Slobodan Savić and others.

== Professional work ==
=== Public works ===
- Dragana Marčić memorial in Belgrade "Wave of Eternity", Belgrade 2007
- Restoration and Conservation of facade statue "The Girl with the violin" on the haus of Milutin Milanković, Belgrade 2008
- Painter Dragan Kecman memorial in Kučevo – "Spirit of Homolje", 2009
- Polijelej in the Church of St. George in Banovo Brdo, Belgrade 2009
- "Sleeping Knight" – Bela Voda near Kruševac, 2009
- Restoration and Conservation of Roman sarcophagus from the 3rd century – Sirmium, Belgrade 2010
- Restoration and Conservation of Roman sarcophagus from the 3rd century – Singidunum, Belgrade 2010
- "Teddy" – Belgrade, 2012
- Miloš Radovanović memorial "Pogled", Belgrade 2013
- Restoration and Conservation of cemetery "Russian Necropolis", Belgrade, 2014

=== Significant exhibitions and awards ===
- 2008

– 9th Biennial of Miniature in Gornji Milanovac
– Biennial of Miniature in Smederevo

- 2009

– Symposium "Belovodska rozeta“

- 2010

– Exhibition of competition works for the memorial of Jevrem Obrenovic, Galerija biblioteke Šabačke, Šabac (shortlist)
– "Spring exhibition", Gallery "Stara Kapetanija", Zemun, Belgrade

- 2011.

– "Spring exhibition", Gallery "Stara Kapetanija"
– Five group exhibition in Kućа Kralja Petra organized by SCASAs during 2011.

- 2012.

– Exhibition o Easter eggs organized by Gallery "Pero", Belgrade
– 11th Biennial of Miniature in Gornji Milanovac
– Group exhibition in Gallery "Dunav", Belgrade
– First Belgrade art symposium organized by Gallery "Pero", Belgrade
– Exhibition "12 vajara jedan izlog" in Pančevo
– "Annual exhibition of Serbian sculptors", Gallery "Paviljon Cvijeta Zuzorić" Belgrade

- 2013.

– Exhibition o Easter eggs organized by Gallery "Pero", Belgrade
– Exhibition "12 +" Kraljevo
– Exhibition "12 +" Kruševac
– Exhibition "12 +" Paraćin
– "Spring exhibition 2013", Gallery "Paviljon Cvijeta Zuzorić" Belgrade
– "Annual exhibition of Serbian sculptors" Muzej železnice u Beogradu
– Solo exhibition "Seed of CREATION", Gallery "PROGRES", Belgrade
– "38. Sisevac art Symposium", Grza
– Exhibition of sculptures section Association of Applied Arts Artists and Designers of Serbia "Roads and tracks", Belgrade
– "29. October art salon Kovin", Cultural center Kovin, Kovin, Praise for the sculpture "Seed of Templars"
– Group exhibition of artworks on photographs "Creatives Rising", New York
– Solo exhibition "Seed", Gallery of Cultural center in Paraćin
– "Zemun salon 2013.", Gallery "Stara Kapetanija" Zemun, Belgrade, Grand Prix for sculpture "Seed of Love"
– "Miniature", Gallery SULUJ, Belgrade
– Solo exhibition "Seed", Museum "Horreum Margi – Ravno" Ćuprija
– Group exhibition of artworks on photographs "SCOPE Art Fair", Miami
– Exhibition "12 +" Pančevo

- 2014.

– Exhibition "12 +", City Gallery of Contemporary Art, Smederevo
– Exhibition "Stone in Architecture & Art", Art Center of the University Library "Svetozar Marković", Belgrade
– Exhibition "12 +", Galerija savremene umetnosti, Novi Sad
– "Annual exhibition of Serbian sculptors", Kuća Kralja Petra, Beograd
– 12th Biennial of Miniature in Gornji Milanovac
– Exhibition "12 +", Cultural Center Čačak, Čačak
– Solo exhibition "Seed", Cultural Center Čačak, Čačak
– "Annual exhibition of Serbian sculptors", Galerija savremene umetnosti, Pančevo
– "Autumn Exhibition 2014", Gallery "Paviljon Cvijeta Zuzorić" Belgrade
– The annual award ULUPUDS for 2013.

- 2015.

– 47. May Exhibition ULUPUDS, Gallery "Kuća Kralja Petra", Belgrade
– "Annual exhibition of Serbian sculptors", Gallery "Paviljon Cvijeta Zuzorić" Belgrade
– 30. October art salon Kovin", Cultural center Kovin, Kovin
– "Autumn Exhibition 2015", Gallery "Paviljon Cvijeta Zuzorić" Belgrade

- 2016.

– Solo exhibition "In the beginning was the WORD", Gallery "ULUS", Belgrade
– "Spring Exhibition 2016", Gallery "Paviljon Cvijeta Zuzorić" Belgrade
– "Annual exhibition of Serbian sculptors", Gallery "Kuća Kralja Petra", Belgrade

== Gallery ==
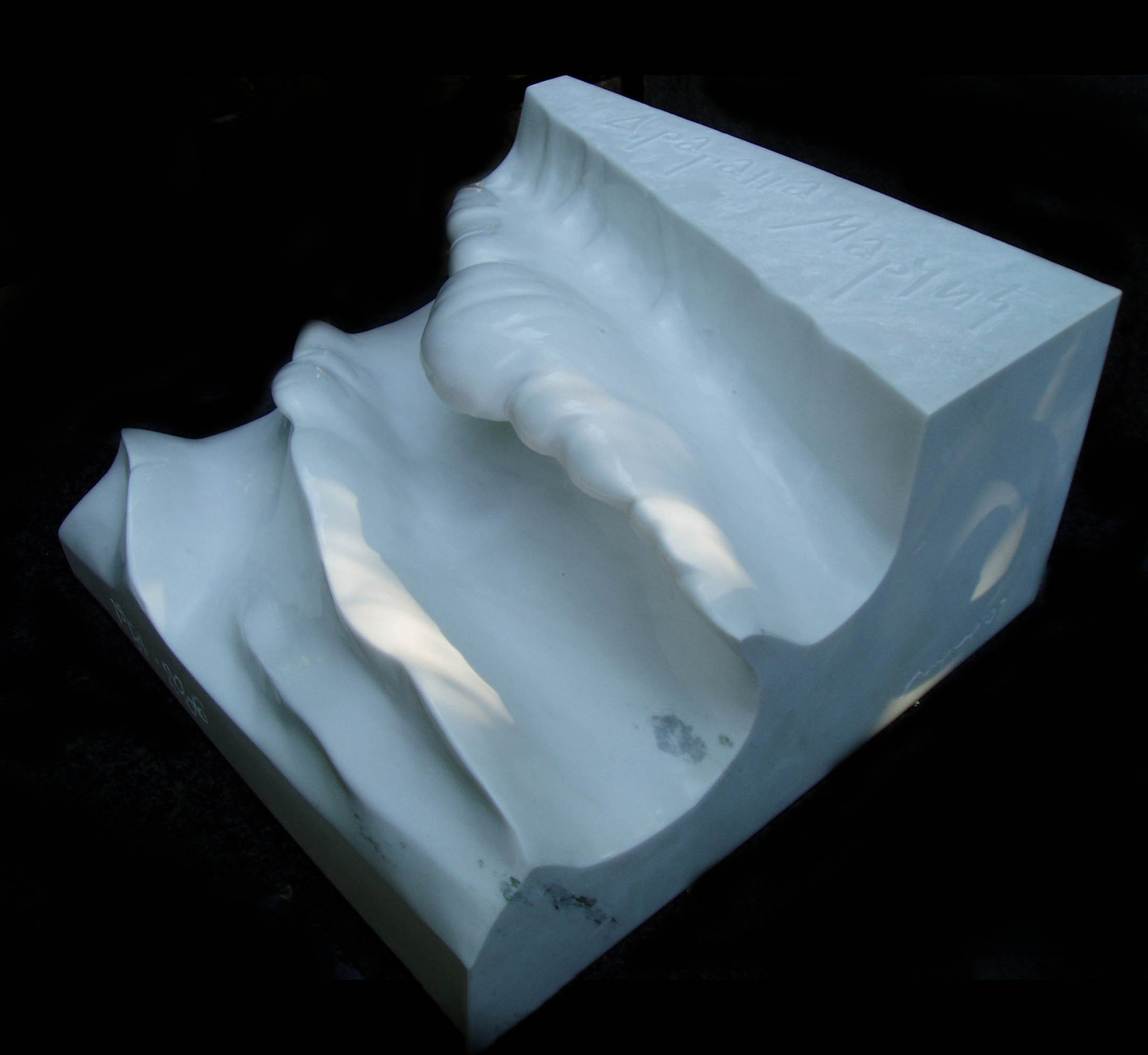
"Wave of Eternity" - Marble "Venčac", Public work, Belgrade 2007

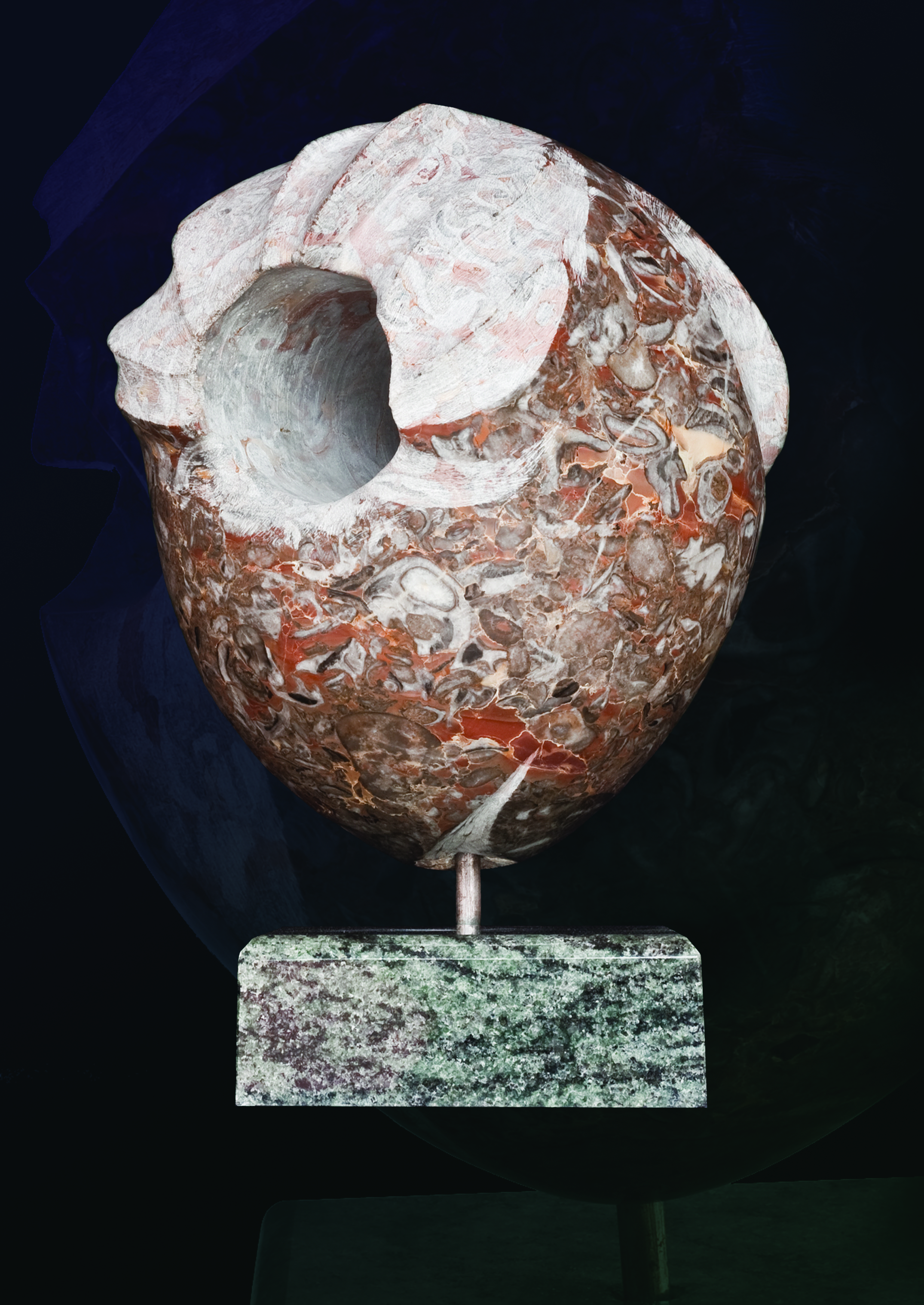
"Next year in Prizren!" - Marble "Ropočevo", Private collection, Belgrade 2013

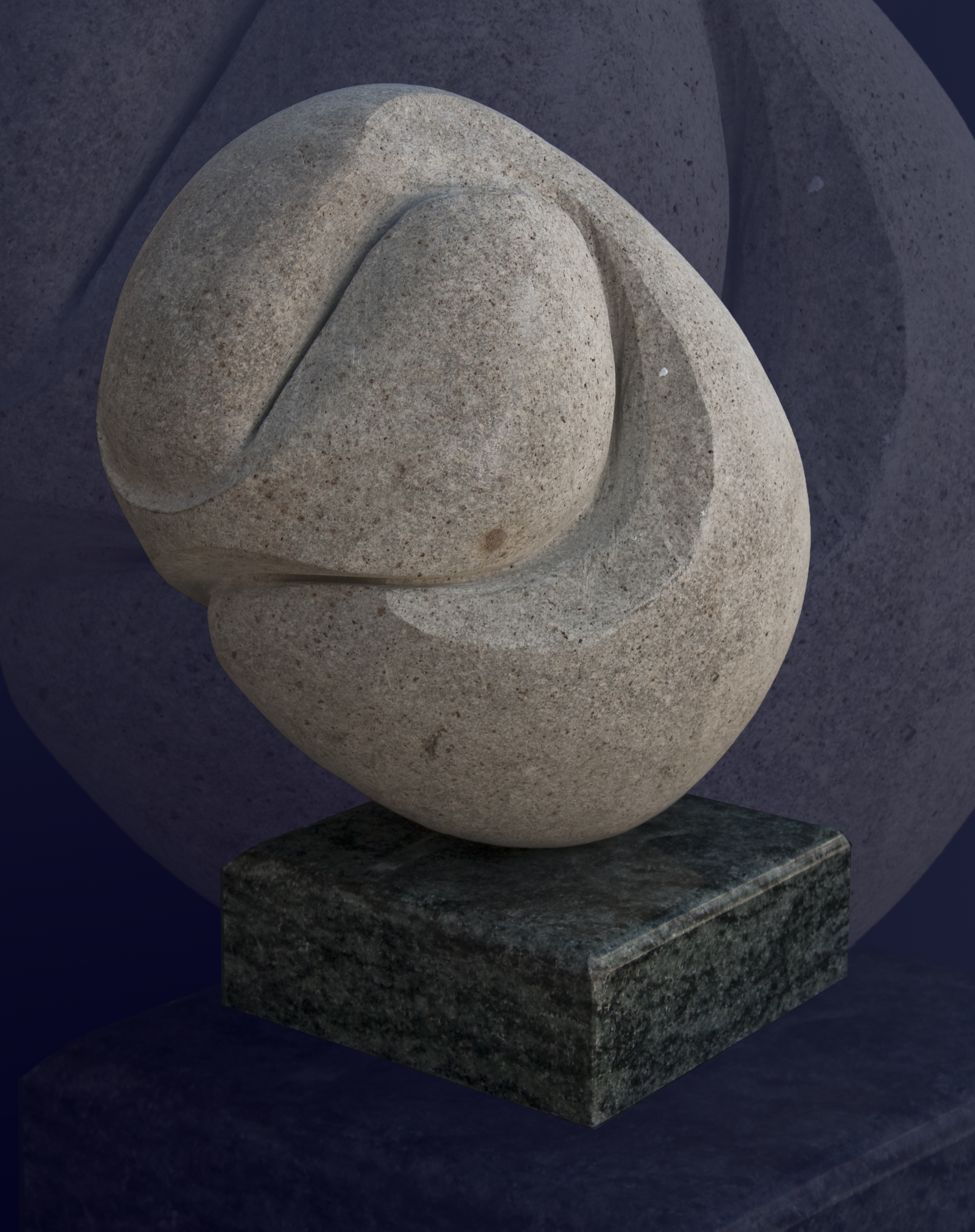
"Bread with seven crusts" - Sandstone Prokuplje, 2012

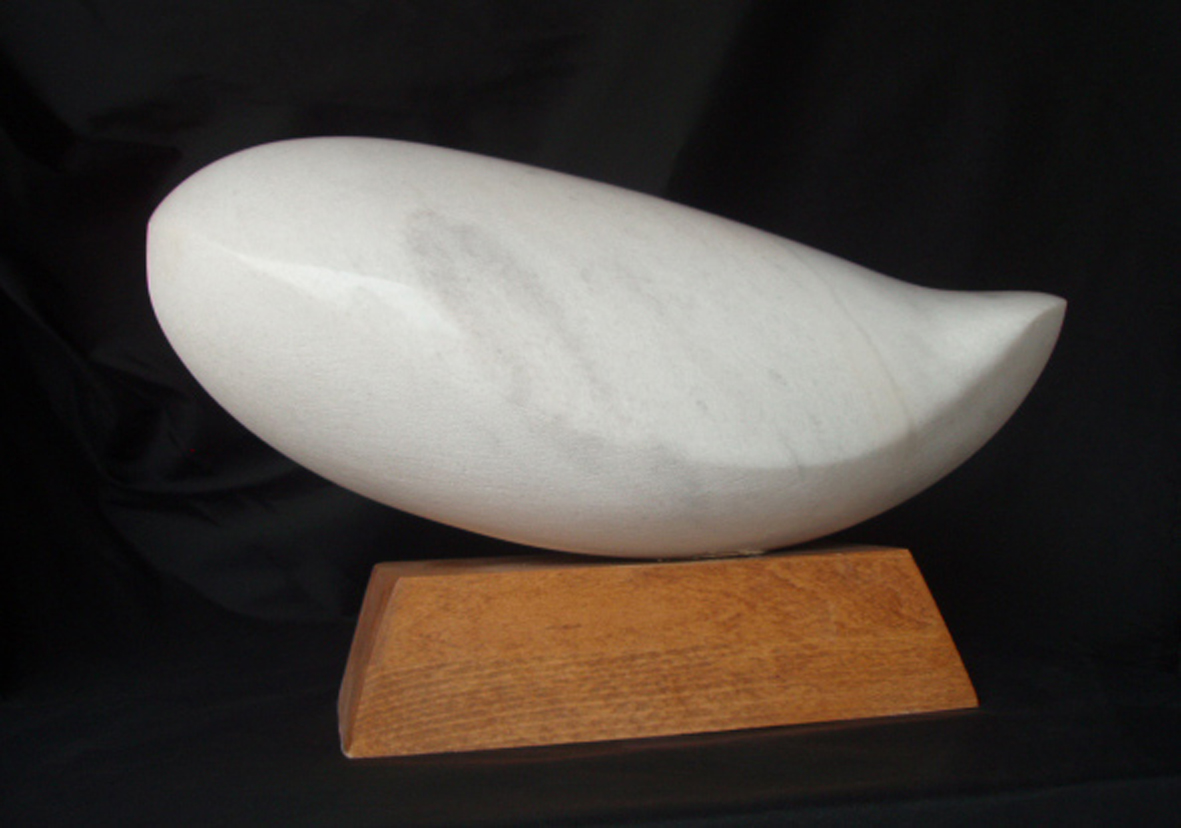
"Danube whale" - Marble "Venčac", Private collection, Belgrade 2013

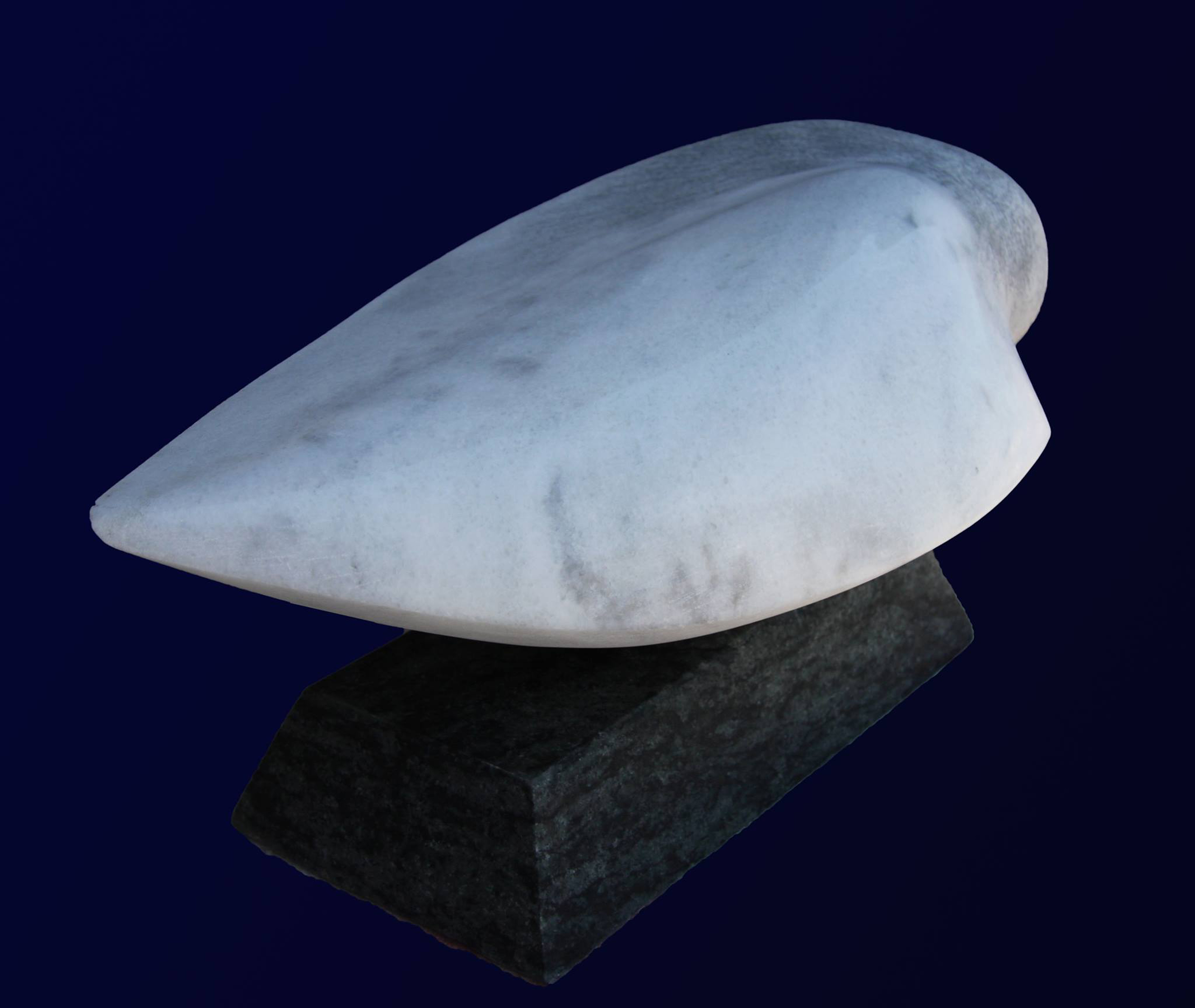
"Nautilus" - Marble "Venčac", 2015

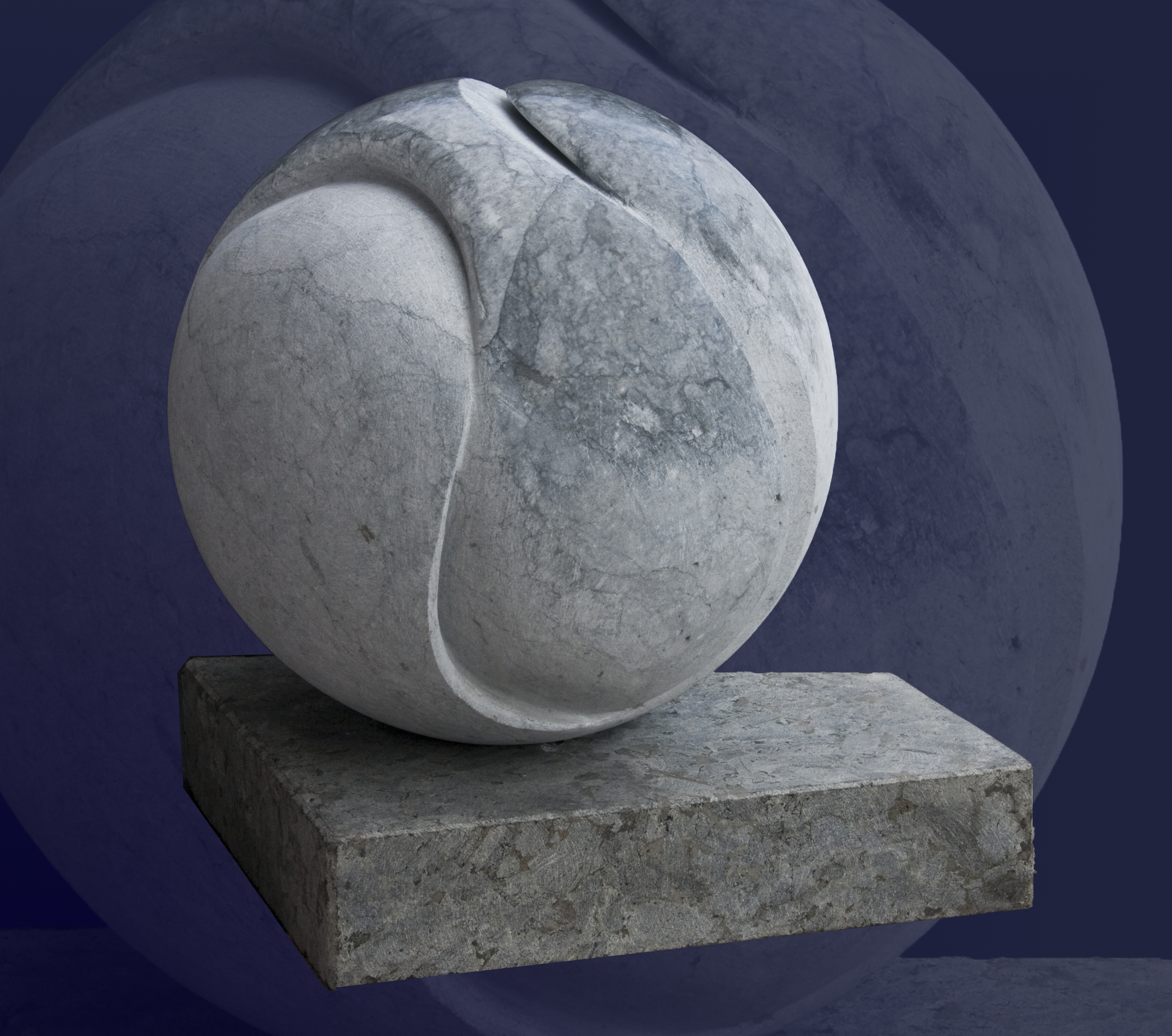
"Clew of Friendship" - Marble "Plavi tok", 2015

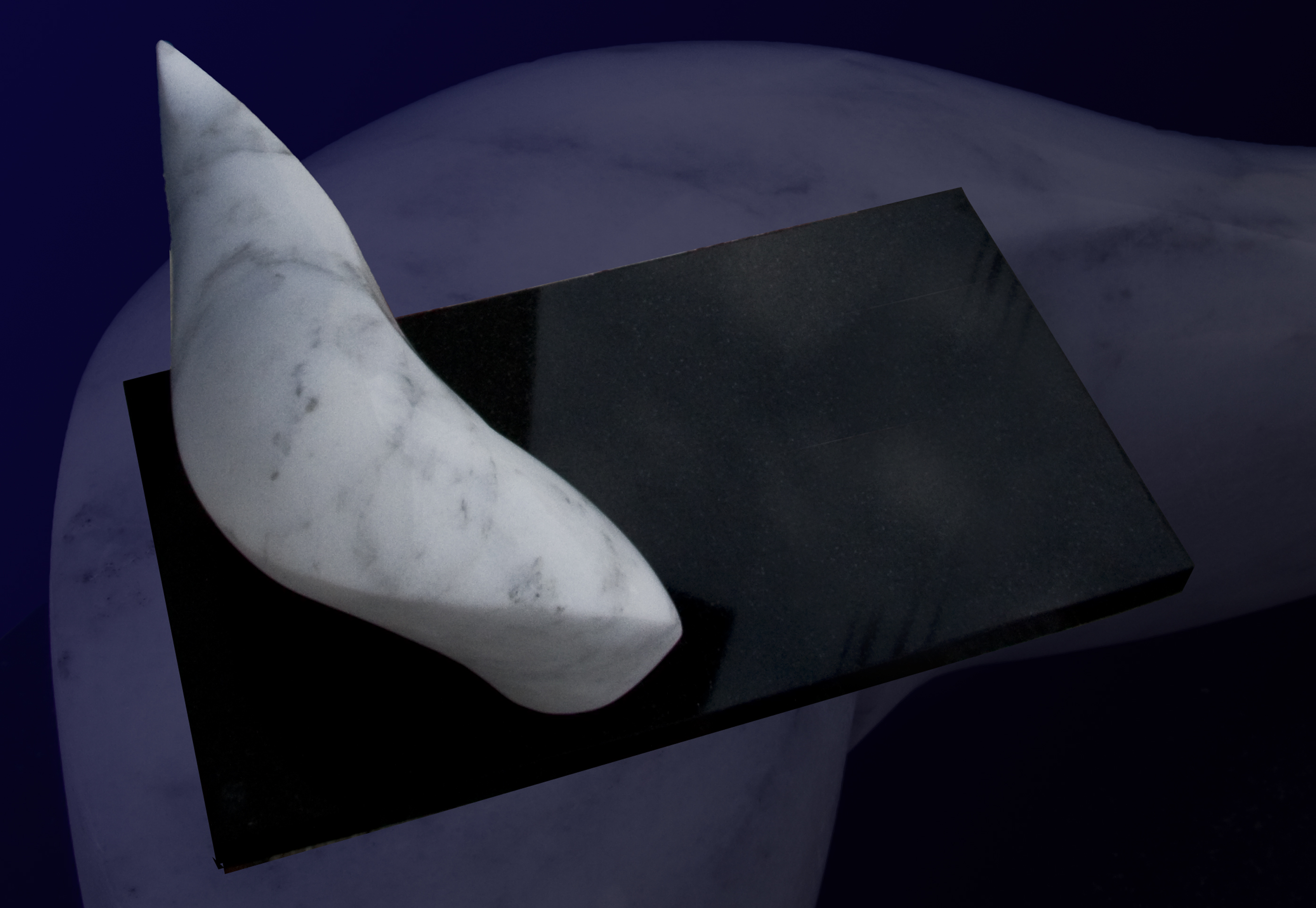
"Sigh" - Marble "Venčac", 2015

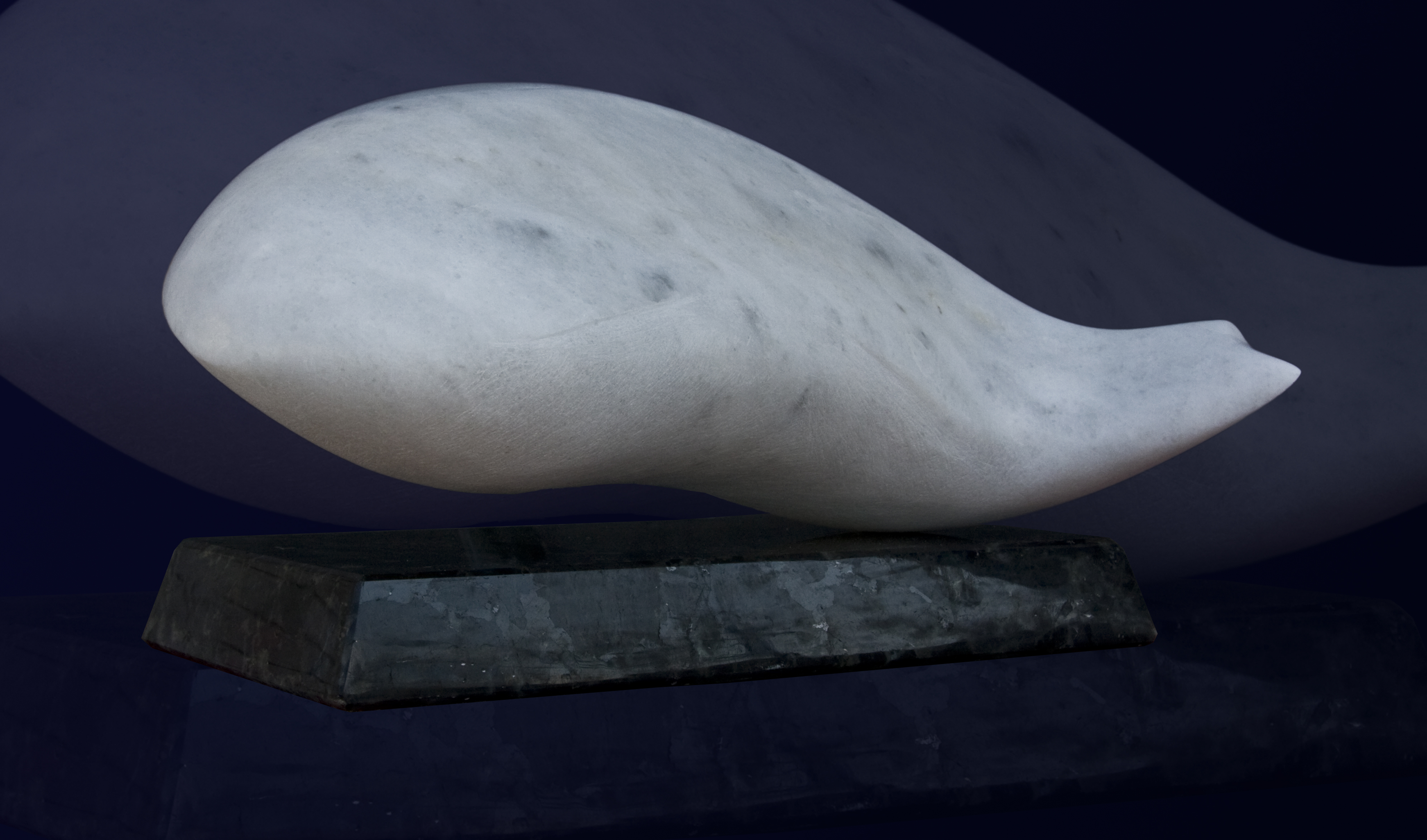
"Happy!" - Marble "Venčac", Private collection, Belgrade 2015

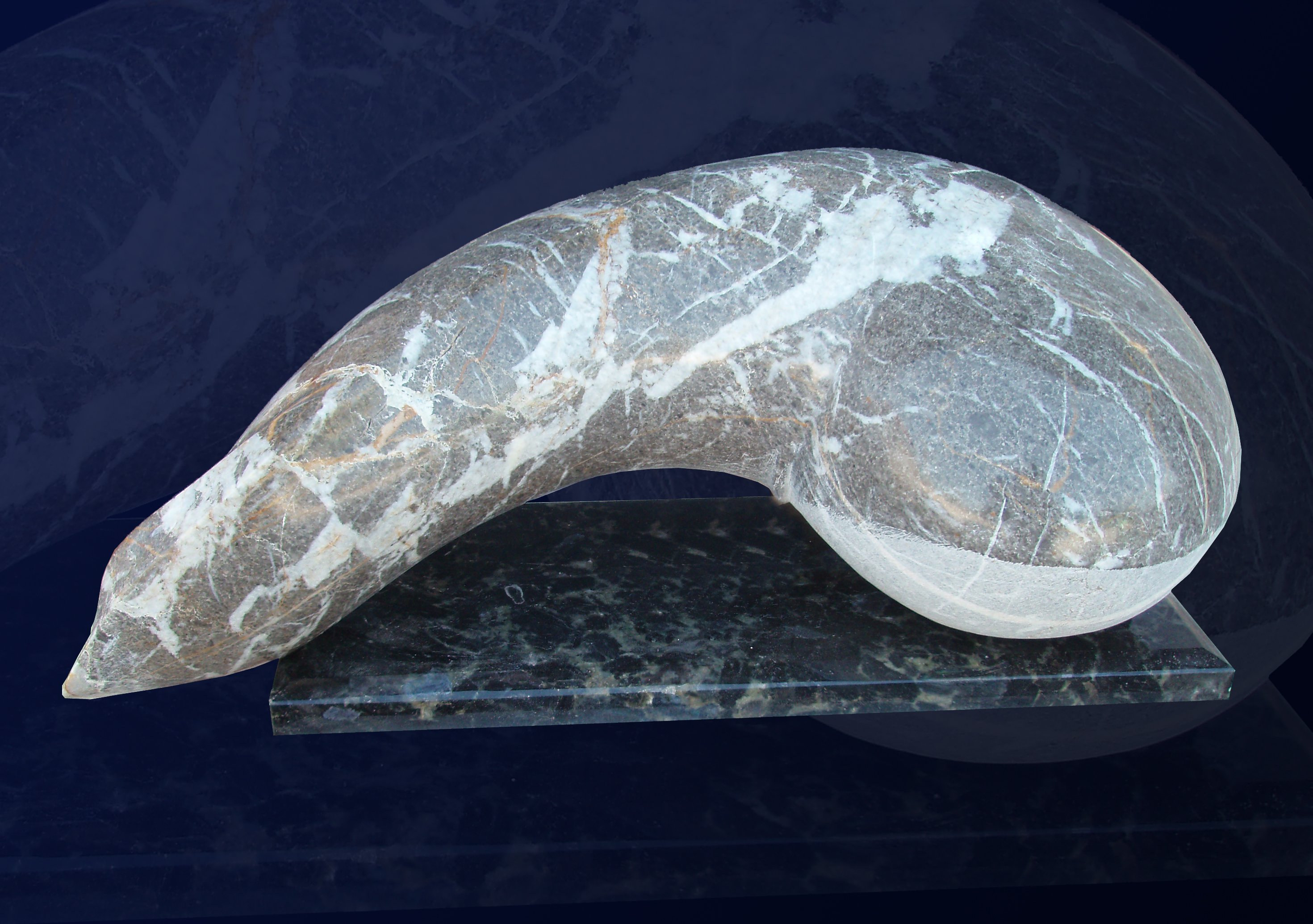
"Trophy" - Marble "Belgrade blue rock", 2013

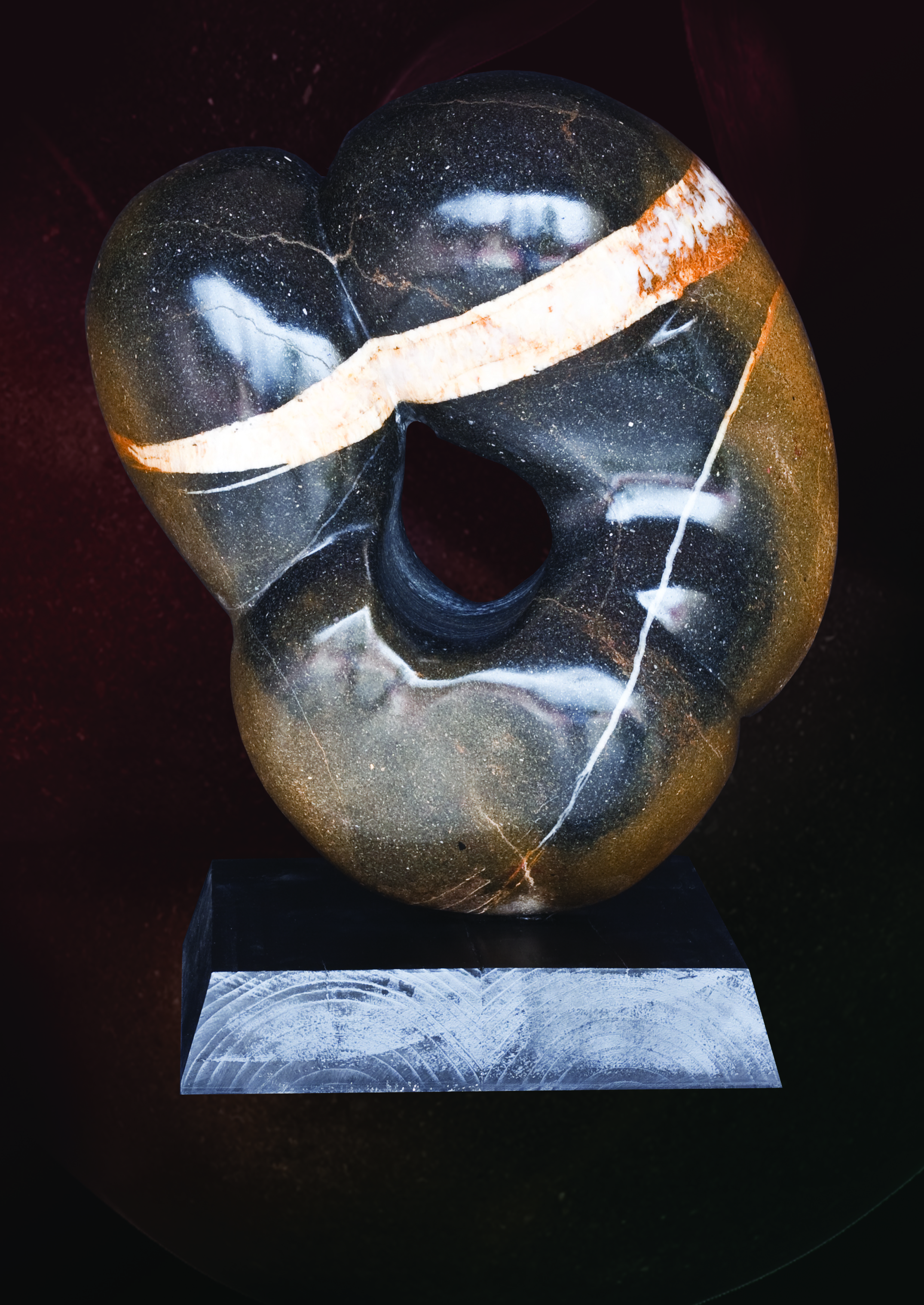
"Seed of Love" - Marble "Kastaljani", Private collection, Tirat Carmel, Israel 2013

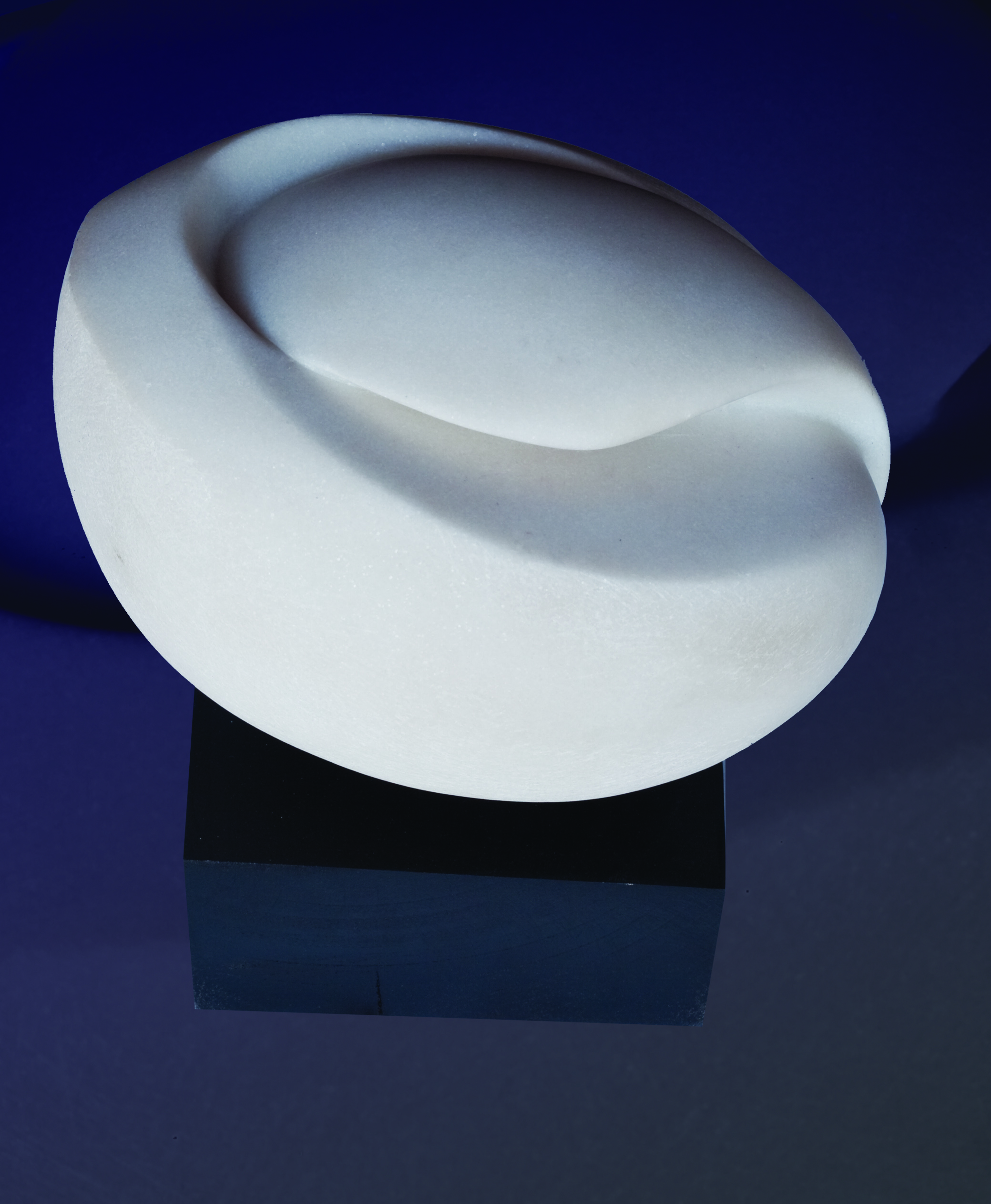
"Seed of Calmness" - Marble "Sivac", Private collection, Belgrade 2012

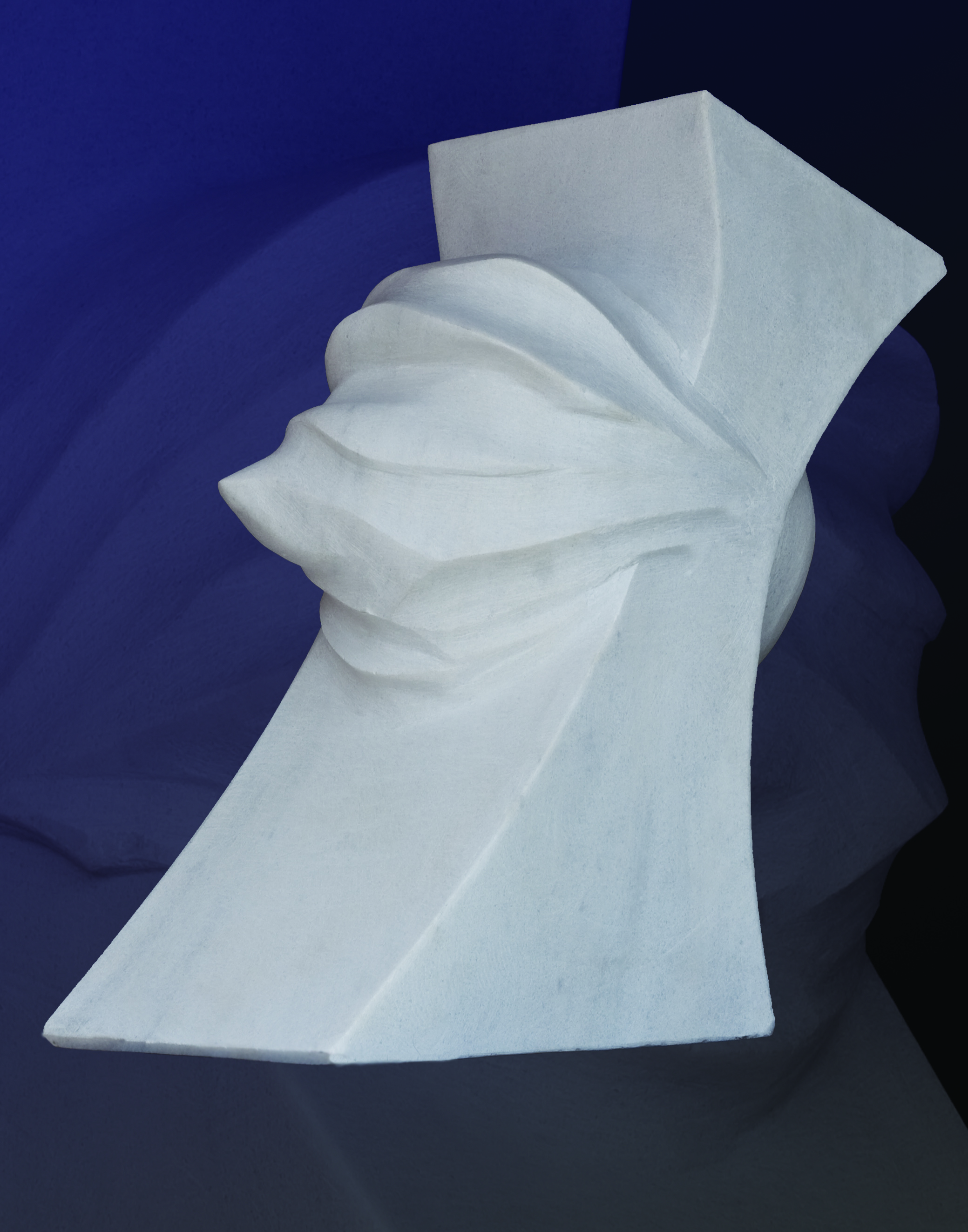
"White Knight" - Marble "Venčac", Private collection, Tirat Carmel, Israel 2013

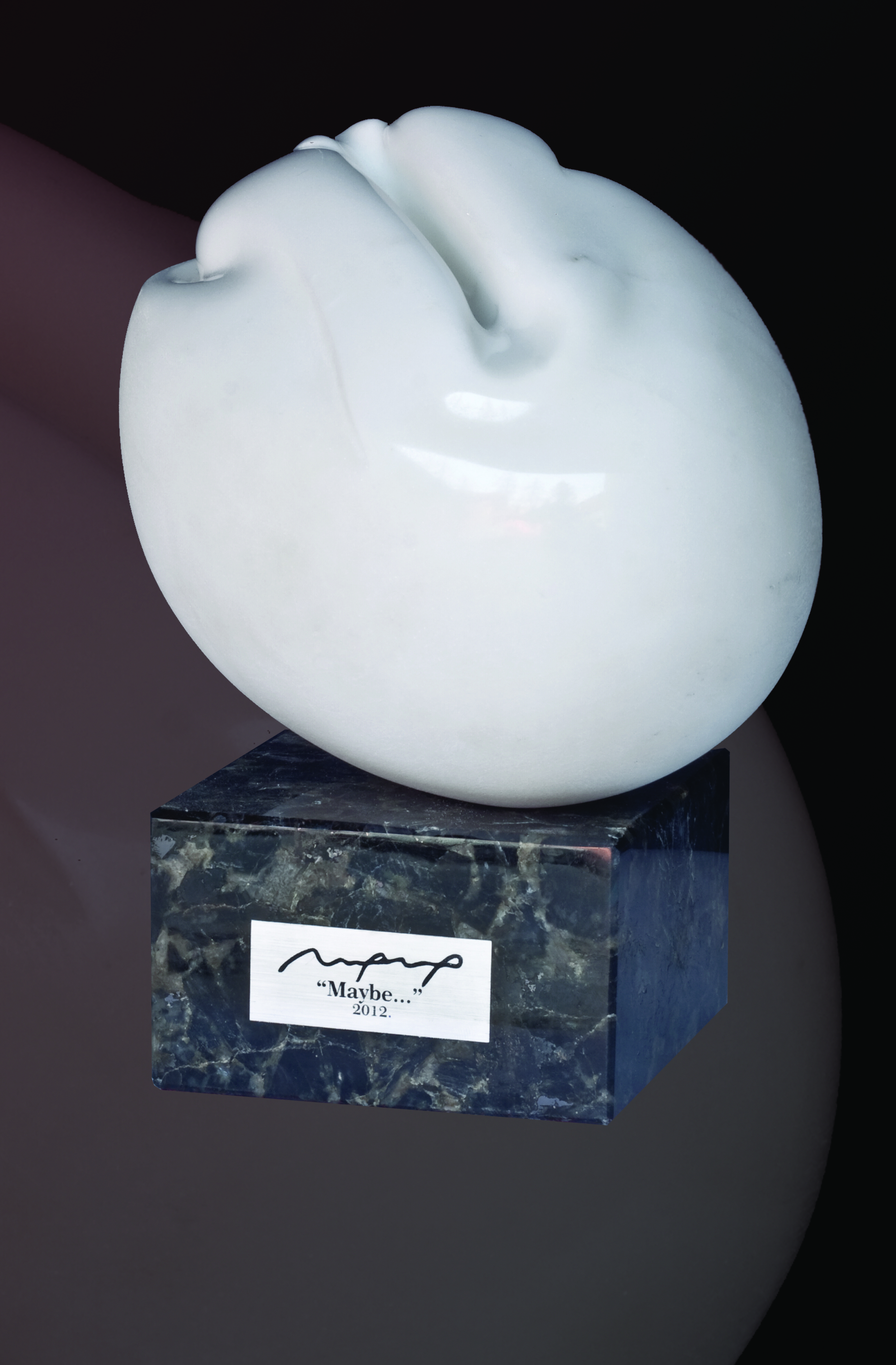
"Maybe..." - Marble "Carara statuario", 2012

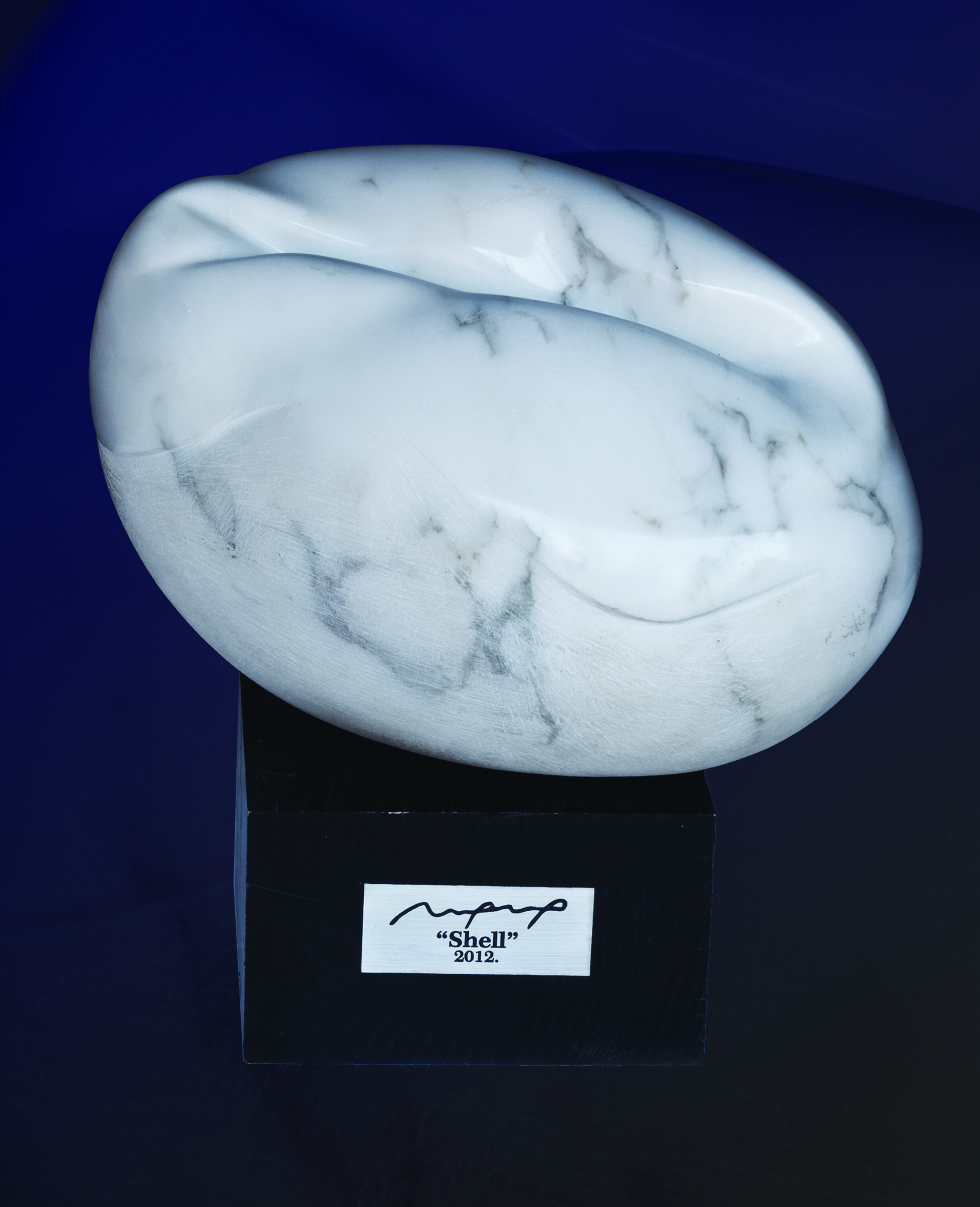
"Shell" - Marble "Carara statuario" 2012

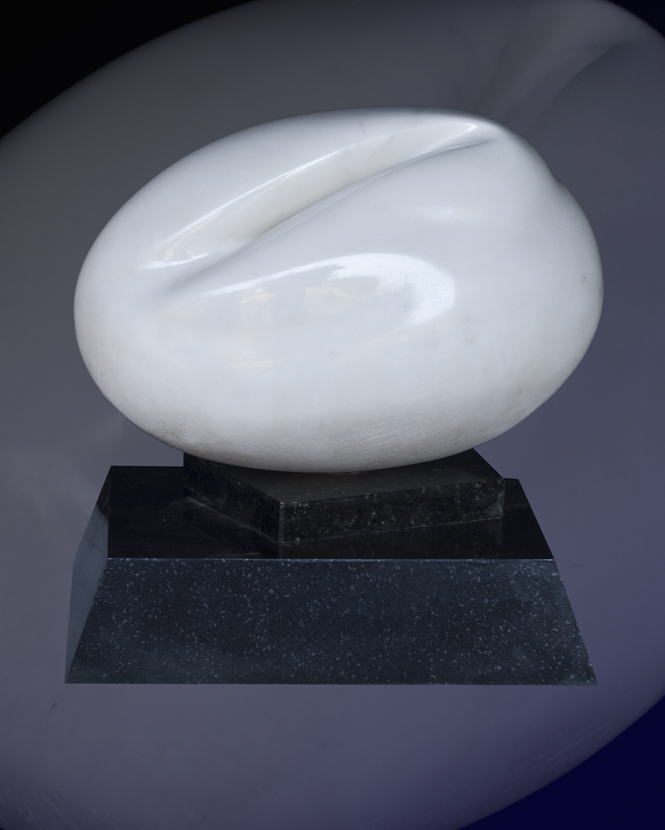
"Still mine..." - Marble "Carara statuario", Private collection, Slovenia 2012

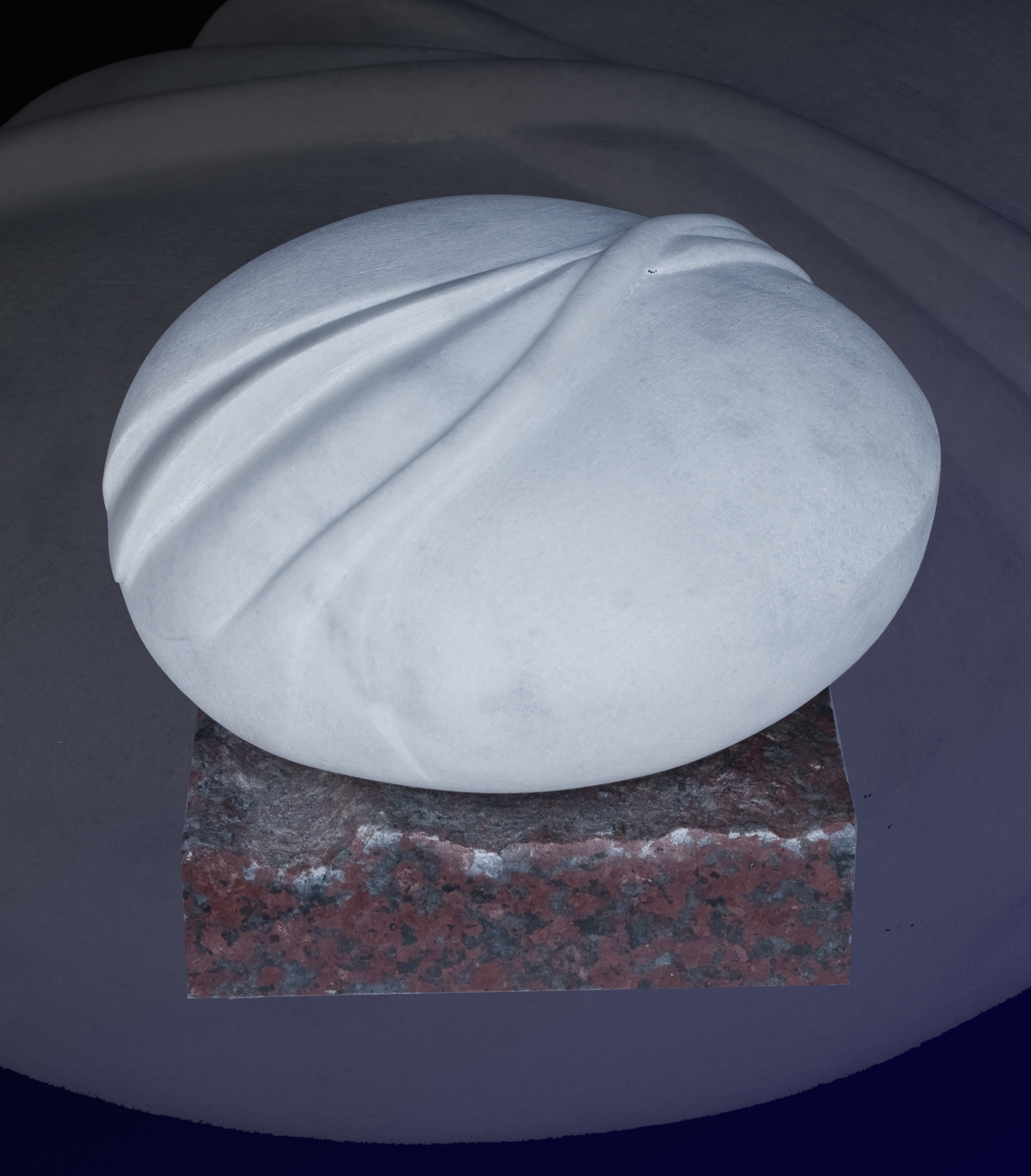
"Moon with a..." - Marble "Venčac", Private collection, Belgrade 2013

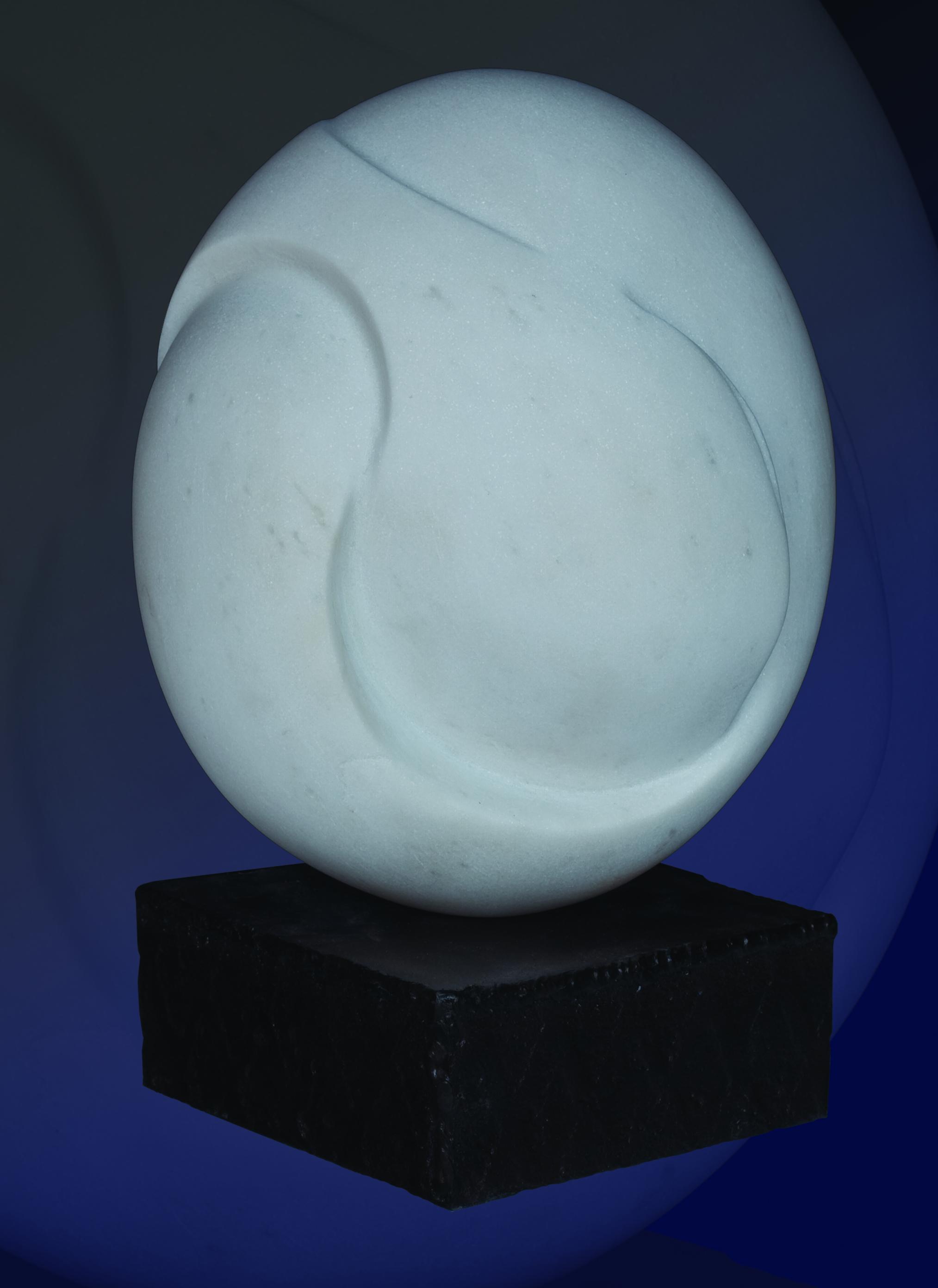
"Easter in my homeland" - Marble "Sivac", Collection of school "Ivan Goran Kovačić", Belgrade 2013

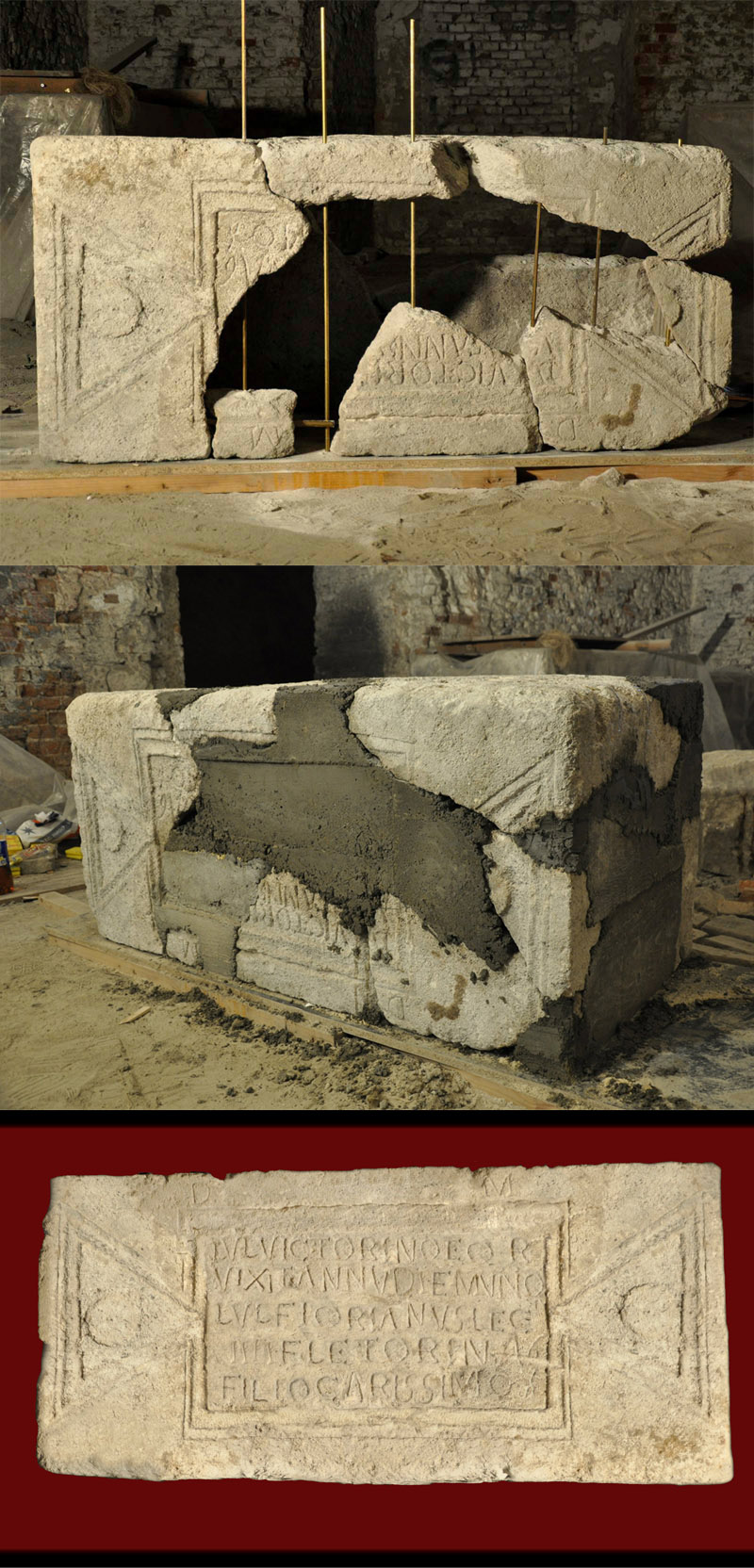
"Rest0ration" - Public work, Restoration and Conservation of Roman sarcophagus from the 3rd century - Singidunum, Belgrade 2010
