= Mirjana Lehner Dragić =

Serbian artist (born 1936)

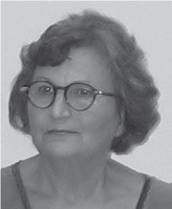
- Mirjana Lehner Dragić
- Born: 28 July 1936 (age 89); Belgrade, Kingdom of Yugoslavia
- Known for: Painting
- Movement: Naturalism
- Awards: ULUPUDS Lifetime Achievement Award

Mirjana Lehner Dragić (Serbo-Croatian Cyrillic: Мирјана Лехнер Драгић; born 28 July 1936) is a Serbian painter.

== Biography ==
=== Early days ===
Mirjana Lehner Dragić was born on 28 July 1936 in Belgrade, to Alfred and Mirjam Lehner. Her father was from Osijek, and her mother was a member of the known Bosnian Jewish family Papo. After the outbreak of the Second World War, she hid with her family in the countryside near Belgrade, then in the village of Vučak near Kruševac, and later fled to Sarajevo with her aunt. While Mirjana and her parents survived the Holocaust, almost her entire maternal family was taken to the Sajmište concentration and extermination camp. After the end of the war, Miriam Lehner could not accept the fact that she had lost almost all her family; she decided then to leave the Federal People's Republic of Yugoslavia in the First Aliya in 1948, leaving Mirjana in Belgrade with her father Alfred.

=== Career ===
Lehner attended high school at the First Women's Gymnasium. She graduated from the Academy of Applied Arts in Belgrade in 1963, majoring in graphics. She received in 1965 the status of "freelance artist", becoming a member of the "Association of Fine Artists of Applied Arts and Designers of Serbia" (ULUPUDS) in 1970. After that, she moved to Paris for a year and a half, exhibiting her works in several galleries such as "La Bateay Lavoir" and "Lafayette". Later, she studied in Italy, Greece, and Israel.

The motifs of her paintings were at the beginning of her career mostly about cities on the coast of the Adriatic Sea and the Sea itself, as well as landscapes of Serbia. At the same time, she was engaged in illustration and graphics for books and art-pedagogical work. During the years 1972 and 1973, she taught book printing and illustration in the technical high school Likovni tehničari in Novi Sad.

For many years, she worked in the area of printed arts in institutions such as in the Department of Archeology of the National Museum of Serbia, the Institute for the Protection of Cultural Monuments, the Faculty of Philosophy at the University of Belgrade, the Institute for the Protection of Cultural Monuments of Novi Sad, the Museum of Vojvodina in Novi Sad and the Museum of Srem in Sremska Mitrovica. At the Second International Conference of the Biopolitics International Organization held in Athens in 1988, she participated as the first environmental painter in a gathering of this type. Since 1995, she has been a member of the Ben Uri Museum in London.

Since the 1990s, she has focused her art on the history and traditions of the Jewish people and especially Sephardic Jews and The Holocaust in German-occupied Serbia. For almost two decades, she led the art section "Leon Koen" in the Jewish Community of Belgrade, and she designed the scenography for the performances of the Belgrade Jewish Theater Kralj David in Pančevo. With the scenography for the play The Violinist on the Roof in 2001, she participated in the 12th International Triennial of Theater Scenography and Costumes in Novi Sad. She has also won the ULUPUDS annual award for the exhibitions "Bridges of Life" (1993), "My Aunt Erne's Lace" (2002) and "Synagogue as Artistic Heritage" (2006). She has also designed the Hebrew Calendars of the Jewish Community of Serbia for the years for 5762 (2001-02) and 5767 (2007-08), along with the exhibition "The Sarajevo Haggadah as an Inspiration" at the Jewish Museum of Belgrade.

== Awards ==
In 2013, she received the Lifetime Achievement Award from the Applied Artists and Designers Association of Serbia.

== Bibliography ==
- Nećak, Aleksandar (2011). Znameniti Jevreji Srbije, Beograd: Savez jevrejskih opština Srbije. ISBN 978-86-915145-0-1
