= Ranko Radović =

Ranko Radović (August 18, 1935 – February 16, 2005) was a Montenegrin and Yugoslav architect, professor and theoretician of architecture. He taught contemporary architecture and urbanism at the University of Belgrade Faculty of Architecture between 1972 and 1992. In 1996 he founded the Novi Sad School of Architecture, a division within the University of Novi Sad.

Ranko Radović was the president of the International Federation for Housing and Planning between 1984 and 1992.

Although Radović has never been seriously interested in politics, in January 2003 he was elected into the government of Montenegro to the post of Minister of Ecology and Urbanism. In this capacity he was noted for originality. For example, his official ministerial vehicle was a bicycle. When he resigned from the post in September 2003, he donated his "official bicycle" to the best student of an elementary school in Podgorica.

The Ranko Radović Award, for promotion of critical theoretical thought and creativity in the field of architecture, is presented annually by "The Applied Artists and Designers Association of Serbia" (ULUPUDS).

== Books ==
- On Architecture, Club of Young Architects, Belgrade, 1971.
- Physical Structure of a City, IAUS, Belgrade, 1972.
- City Centers, Faculty of Architecture, Belgrade, 1976.
- Living Space, Independent Editions Slobodan Mašić, Belgrade, 1979.
- The Form of a City, STYLOS, Novi Sad, 2003 / Orion art, Belgrade, 2003 / Građevinska Knjiga, Belgrade, 2009.
- Anthology of Houses, Građevinska Knjiga, Belgrade, 1985,1988,1989,1991.
- New Anthology of Houses, Građevinska Knjiga, Belgrade, 2007.
- Contemporary Architecture, STYLOS, Novi Sad, 1998, 2001.
- A Garden or a Cage, Prometej, Novi Sad, 1995.
- A New Garden and an Old Cage, STYLOS, Novi Sad, 2005.

== Awards ==
- 1997: Lifetime achievement award from The Applied Artists and Designers Association of Serbia (ULUPUDS)
- 1997: Vuk Award
