= Dragović (surname) =

Dragović (Cyrillic: Драговић, pronounced [drâɡoʋitɕ]) is a Bosnian, Croatian, Montenegrin and Serbian patronymic surname, meaning "son of Drago". Notable people with the surname include:

- Aleksandar Dragović (born 1991), Austrian footballer
- Doris Dragović (born 1961), Croatian pop singer
- Goran Dragović (born 1981), Bosnian footballer
- Nikola Dragović (born 1987), Serbian basketball player
- Nina Dragović (born 2008), Montenegrin rhythmic gymnast
- Vladimir Dragović (born 1967), scholar
- Vojislav Dragović (born 1982), Serbian footballer
- surname from the Vasojevići clan

== See also ==
- Dragojević
- Dragičević
- Dragić
