= Dragojević =

Dragojević (Cyrillic: Драгојевић) is a Croatian, Montenegrin and Serbian surname derived from the masculine given name Dragoje. Notable people with the surname include:

- Oliver Dragojević (1947–2018), Croatian pop singer
- Srđan Dragojević (born 1963), Serbian film director and screenwriter

== See also ==
- Dragović
- Dragičević
- Dragić
