= Milorad Dragićević =

Serbian Yugoslav footballer

Personal information
- Date of birth: 6 October 1904
- Place of birth: Belgrade, Kingdom of Serbia
- Date of death: 7 December 1975 (aged 71)
- Place of death: Belgrade, SFR Yugoslavia
- Position: Midfielder

Youth career
- Jugoslavija

Senior career*
Years	Team	Apps	(Gls)
1923	SK Jadran Beograd		
1924–1929	BSK Beograd		

International career
1926–1928	Yugoslavia	2	(0)
- * Club domestic league appearances and goals

Milorad Dragićević (Serbian Cyrillic: Милорад Драгићевић; 6 October 1904 – 7 December 1975) was a Serbian and Yugoslavian international footballer.

== Biography ==
Dragićević was born in Belgrade, Kingdom of Serbia, and started playing in the youth team of SK Jugoslavija. In 1923 he played with SK Jadran Beograd. He became notable while playing for the "Blues", BSK Beograd from 1924 to 1929 when he stopped playing because of an injury. He played either as left winger or striker.

Dragićević played two matches for the Yugoslavia national team, both matches against Romania the Friendly Nations Cup, one in 1926 and another in 1928.

Serbian sports journalist in the book "Večiti rivali" describes him as one of the best Serbian players of the 1920s and a holder of one of the strongest shots. After the Second World War he worked as a cashier in the Football Association of Yugoslavia until 1970. He died in Belgrade in 1975.
