= Nikola Dragičević =

Serbian footballer

Personal information
- Full name: Nikola Dragičević
- Date of birth: 26 March 1988 (age 38)
- Place of birth: Belgrade, SFR Yugoslavia
- Height: 1.87 m (6 ft 2 in)
- Position: Defender

Senior career*
Years	Team	Apps	(Gls)
2005–2008	Partizan	0	(0)
2005–2008	→ Teleoptik (loan)	37	(0)
2008–2009	Srem	1	(0)
2009–2012	Čukarički	50	(1)
2012–2014	Žarkovo		
2014–2016	FK Prva Iskra		
2016–2019	IFK Eskilstuna	15	(0)

International career^{‡}
- Serbia U19
- * Club domestic league appearances and goals as of 4 July 2024 ‡ National team caps and goals as of 9 April 2010

Nikola Dragičević (Serbian Cyrillic: Никола Драгичевић; born 26 March 1988) is a Serbian retired footballer.

== External sources ==
- Nikola Dragičević at Utakmica.rs (in Serbian)
- Nikola Dragičević at Soccerway (archived)
- Nikola Dragičević at Lagstatstik (in Swedish)
