= Milan Minić (architect) =

Serbian architect and painter

Milan S. Minić
- Born: 1889; Prijepolje, Kingdom of Serbia
- Died: 1961 (72); Belgrade, SR Serbia, SFR Yugoslavia
- Education: University of Belgrade
- Occupation: Architect
- Buildings: Majestic Hotel in Belgrade; Zeleni Venac Hotel in Šabac

Milan Minić (Serbian Cyrillic: Милан Минић, 1889–1961) was a Serbian architect and painter.

He was founder and first president of The Applied Artists and Designers Association of Serbia" (ULUPUDS) in 1953.

== Notable works ==
His works include:

- The building facade in Belgrade, Čika Ljubina 5
- hotels: Zeleni Venac in Šabac and Majestic in Belgrade
- Majdanpek House of Culture
- Reconstruction and adaptation of the Old Palace in Belgrade for use of the Presidium of the FPR Yugoslavia National Assembly and the New Palace in Belgrade for the Government presidency of the PR Serbia
- Completion, adaptation and interior decoration of the House of the National Assembly of Serbia
- Refurbishment of the Writers Club in Francuska Street 7, Belgrade and the Topčider House of Troops.
- Šabac City Market Building

== See also ==
- List of painters from Serbia
