= Rajna Dragićević =

Serbian linguist, lexicologist, and lexicographer

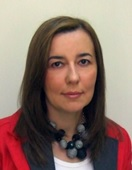
- Education: University of Belgrade
- Scientific career
- Fields: Linguistics
- Website: http://www.fil.bg.ac.rs

Rajna Dragićević, PhD, (Serbian Cyrillic: Рајна Драгићевић) is a Serbian linguist, lexicologist and lexicographer. She is a full professor at the Faculty of Philology, the University of Belgrade, Serbia.

Dragićević is the author of over 250 articles published in Serbian and international linguistic journals. She has published five books, Pridevi sa značenjem ljudskih osobina u savremenom srpskom jeziku (2000), Leksikologija srpskog jezika (2007, 2010), Verbalne asocijacije kroz srpski jezik i kulturu (2010), Leksikologija i gramatika u skoli (2012) and Srpska leksika u prošlosti i danas(2018). She collaborated in making of four dictionaries, Asocijativni rečnik srpskoga jezika (2005), Semantičko-derivacioni rečnik, II sveska (2007), Rečnik srpskoga jezika (2007) published by Matica srpska, and Obratni asocijativni rečnik srpskoga jezika (2011).

Dragićević is a recipient of the Serbian linguistic award Pavle Ivić.
