= Dragojevac =

Dragojevac may refer to:

- Dragojevac (Arilje), a village in Arilje, Serbia
- Dragojevac (Vladimirci), a village in Vladimirci, Serbia
