= The Applied Artists and Designers Association of Serbia =

The Applied Artists and Designers Association of Serbia (ULUPUDS)
- Genre: Professional association promoting arts and design via exhibitions, awards, and lectures
- Frequency: 40 exhibitions per year
- Locations: Belgrade, Serbia
- Participants: Association members
- Member: 1500 members
- Website: www.ulupuds.org.rs/eng/ONama.htm

The Applied Artists and Designers Association of Serbia (Serbian: Udruženje likovnih umetnika primenjenih umetnosti i dizajnera Srbije, ULUPUDS) is an organization that supports Serbian professionals working in the fields of art and design. This includes architecture, textiles, scenography, costume design, sculpture, graphics, paintings, ceramics, art photography, restoration, and art history.

One of the largest arts organizations in the country, the ULUPUDS was founded in 1953 in Belgrade and its first president was architect Milan Minić. The association is formed of an executive committee and an arts council. About 150 members joined at the start and today there are about 1500 members.

The group's goal is to promote the applied arts and design to businesses and the general public. Every year, it holds the "Ranko Radovic Awards", honoring excellence in architecture and TV programming, as well as the "Pavle Vasić Awards" for written texts about the arts.

The ULUPUDS has held numerous exhibitions since its inception, including the 1958 "Taste, Distaste" exhibit and the 1962 "Subject of Memories" show. The organization has two permanent exhibition spaces, the Singidunum Gallery and Singidunum "Small Gallery", which are located in downtown Belgrade. Around 40 exhibitions are held each year in the two galleries and also in rented venues. The main shows include the annual "May Exhibition" for all members, the "Golden Pen of Belgrade" illustration contest for those in the fine arts, the "Golden Smile" competition for cartoonists, and the "Ceramics Biennial" for pottery makers.

The exhibitions help promote the work of members and contribute towards a professional code of ethics. Additionally, the ULUPUDS sends Serbian participants to international art and design shows. The association also coordinates lectures and conferences, while advocating for rules governing the profession such as royalties and tax policy.

The ULUPUDS belongs to several international societies such as the ICSID and ICOGRADA.

== Recent Highlights ==
- In 2018, Sofia Bunardzic earned a Lifetime Achievement award from the association for her work in ceramics.
- In 2017, several authors, illustrators and publishers were presented with awards at the Belgrade Book Fair. Winners included Platoneum, Stanka Janković Pivljanin, Aleksa Gajić, Dr. Slobodan Marković, Vukica Mikača, Aleksandar Pribićević, and Dusan Krtolica.
- In 2016, the ULUPUDS held an exhibition on textile design at the Museum of Applied Arts in Belgrade. Artists from Serbia, Croatia, Latvia and Finland presented their work.
- In 2015, industrial designer Marko Luković had a show at the association's Singidunum Gallery.
- In 2013, to celebrate its 60 years, the ULUPUDS held an exhibition with 220 member artists at the Andric Wreath exhibition hall in Belgrade.
- In 2011, the publisher "Family Manufacture" won for its book on Jugoslav Vlahovic's editorial illustrations.
- The 2007 "Pavle Vasic" award went to Mirjana Roter-Blagojevic for her book on Belgrade architecture.
- In 2006, Aleksandar Kadijevic, Radonja Dabetic, and Vladimir Mitrovic won the "Ranko Radovic" award.

== Notable members ==
- Danica Karađorđević

== See also ==
- Belgrade Fashion Week
- Belgrade Design Week
