= Ziss Modell =

German automobile manufacturer

Ziss-Modell
- Formerly: Mini-Auto; R. W. Modell
- Founded: 1960s
- Founder: E. Witteck
- Defunct: 1978; 48 years ago
- Headquarters: Lintorf, Germany
- Products: Die-cast scale model cars

Ziss-Modell, originally also called R. W. Modell or Wittek Modell were 'brand' names of the German Mini-Auto firm which made diecast metal classic and contemporary vehicles from the 1960s through the late 1970s. Later, use of the Mini-Auto name largely disappeared and the models were mainly known as Ziss or R. W. Modell. The company was based in Lintorf.

== Complex name history ==
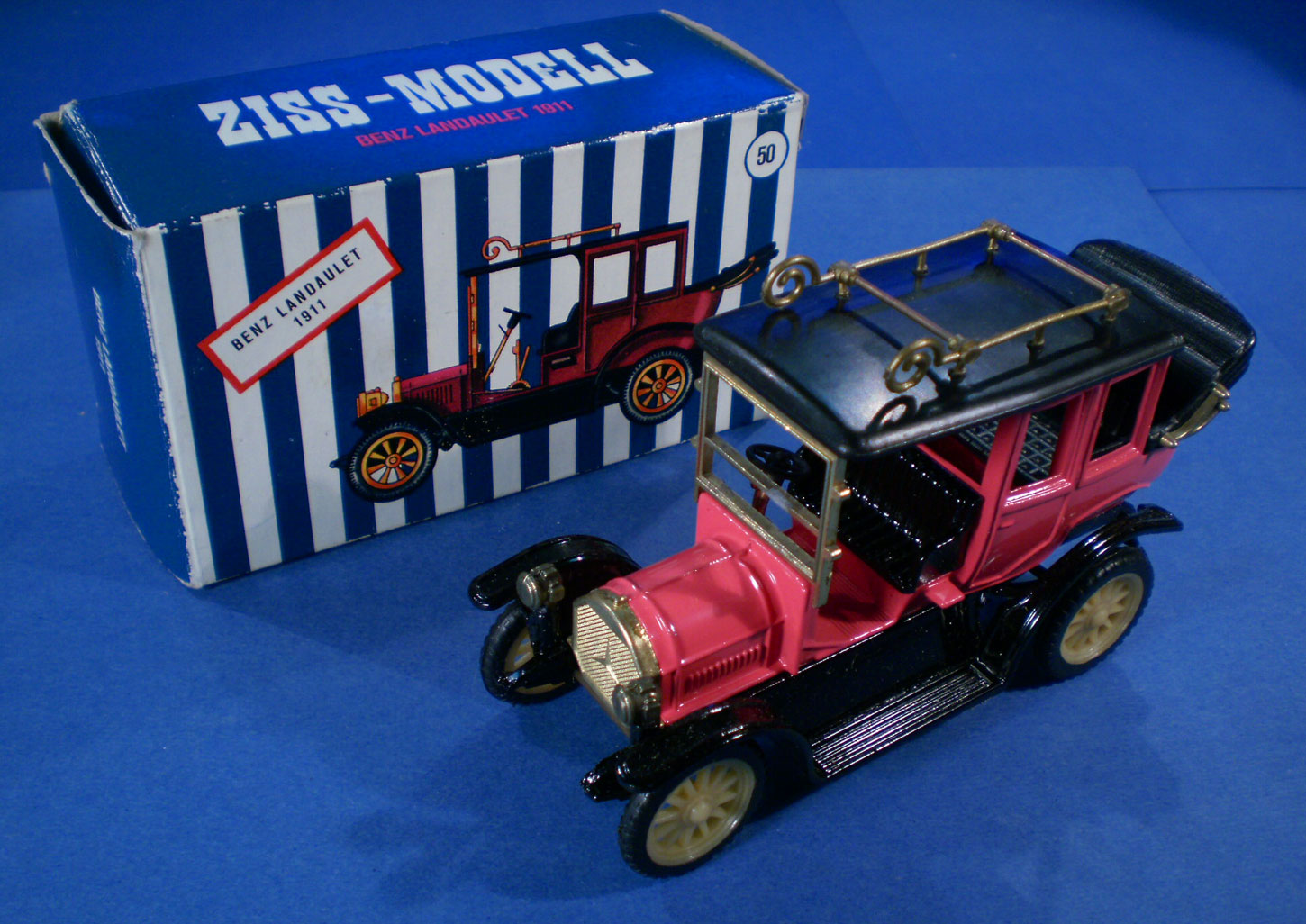
Ziss-Modell were models made near Düsseldorf. Bodies were diecast metal with plastic parts. Sometimes parts came in special illustrated packages to be assembled like the ornate roof racks on this Benz. The box portrays the model provided. R. W. Modell boxes were the same design, but red

The company began sometime in the 1960s as the "Mini-Auto Company" with models called R.W. Modell –possibly for the founder E. (probably Erich) Wittek or another relative of the same family –brand nomenclature in early pamphlets is unclear. The Mini-Auto name appeared occasionally on packaging and the bases of models, but it usually appeared only in brochures. Later, about the mid-1970s, use of the name Mini-Auto disappeared in favor of only R. W. Modell or Ziss. This may have been due to confusion with other names of miniature manufacturers like Italy's Dugu Miniautotoys, the Miniauto line produced by Kaden in Czechoslovakia, or Dave Sinclair's Mini-Auto import and sales shop in Erie, Pennsylvania.

Finally, R. W. Modell seems to have been changed to Ziss which may have also been a family name. For a time, however, the two names were used simultaneously under the Mini-Auto or Wittek Modell appellation and some company brochures show both 'brands' on their covers. There appears to have been no specific model differentiation between the two lines. The influential U.S. importer David Sinclair, who scoured Europe for new models and got to know many of the individuals behind the companies, called the company a "comparatively small family operation".

The company, whichever name is used, was located in Lintorf, West Germany, a town near Ratingen, north of Düsseldorf and not far from the Rhine River. R. W. and Ziss boxes commonly say "Made in Western-Germany" on the flaps. The company made both contemporary and veteran vehicles. That a German manufacturer would carry models from two distinct decades seems a rare treat - French companies like Minialuxe, RAMI by J.M.K. or Italian Rio Models and Brumm were ahead of any German firm in making veteran vehicles from before 1930. Except for Cursor Models which were made for the Mercedes-Benz museum in Stuttgart, and some Gama veteran cars, Ziss seems to be the only German manufacturer dedicated to making an array of models from the veteran era.

== Veteran Line ==
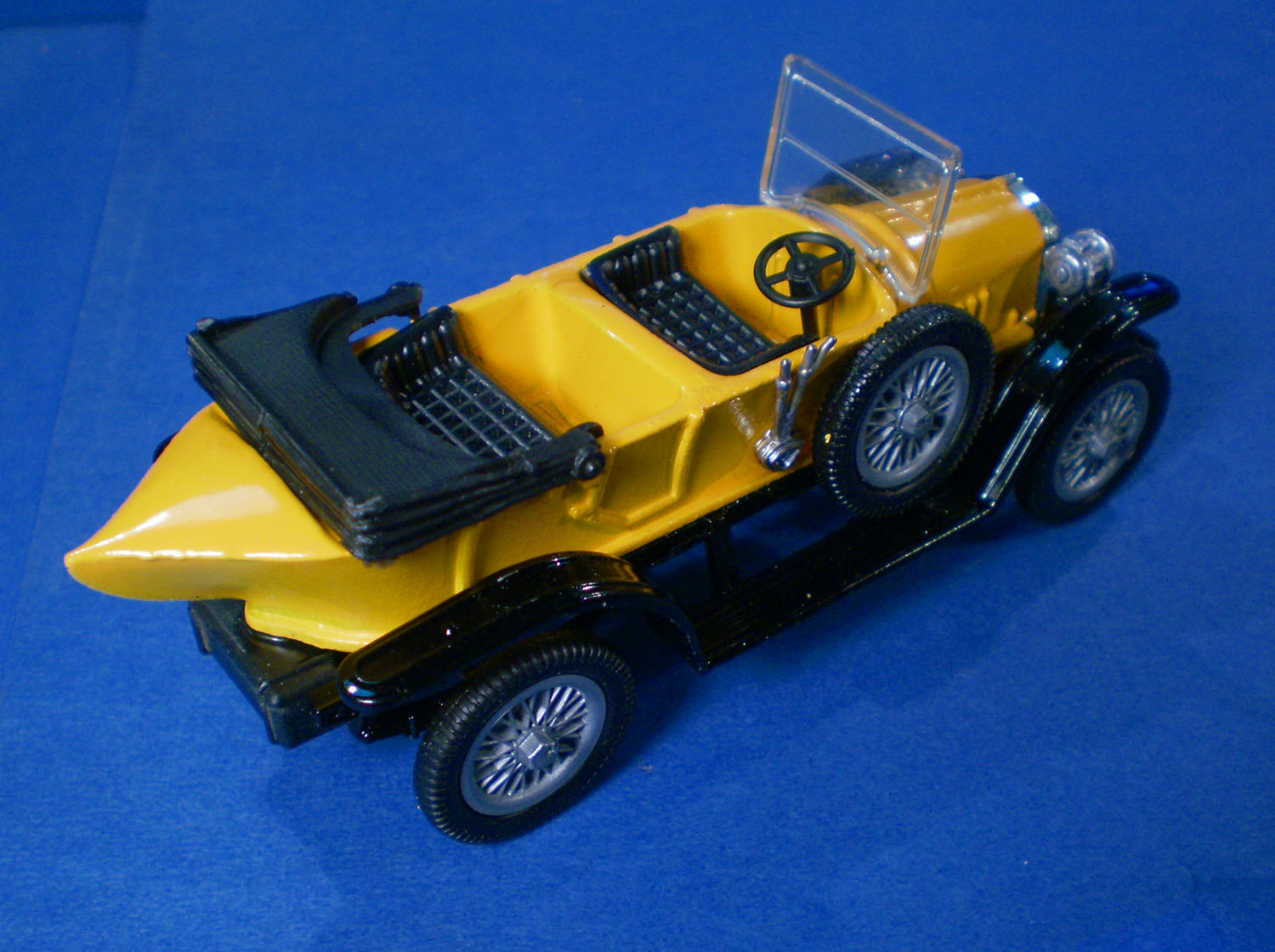
Ziss-Modell / Euro-Modell no. 60 1913 Audi Alpensieger (Alps winner) with boat-tail design. This is a "Euro-Modell", with the Ziss name blotted out from the metal base. The same model number is used as that applied in the original Ziss line-up

The earliest models were a classic line of mostly German vehicles in the spirit of French RAMI by J.M.K. or Italian Rio Models. Both autos and trucks were produced, usually in three or four different colors for each model. Under the earlier R.W. name, models included the 1920s Hanomag "Kommisbrot" ("bread loaf" - in top up and top down versions, like Rio and Brumm models), a 1905 Mercedes Kettenwagen, coupe and Grand Prix, a BMW Dixi, and a FIAT 508S Balilla coupe.

Under the Ziss Modell name, new marques such as Adler, Mercedes-Simplex, Audi Alpensieger, Opel, and N.A.G. appeared. New trucks appeared as well like Henschel, M.A.N. and B.V. tankers. These trucks were heavy with an unusually high metal content. Some of the models, like selected Henschel trucks, appeared as special promotionals in distinct white boxes. Even a couple of Ford Model Ts, including a utility "Ranch-wagen", were made, similar to choices that the French RAMI by J.M.K. had done. It is interesting that none of the R. W. models appear to have leaked over into the Ziss line-up, showing somewhat of a break in development of models between R. W. and Ziss Modell - but about 1970 or so, both were offered simultaneously, and there appears no specific rationale for the two lines, other than a gradual name change. For Ziss at least two significantly different versions from each marque appeared, such as an Opel Stadtcoupe and an Opel Torpedo or the Adler phaeton and the Adler limousine.

== Contemporary offerings ==
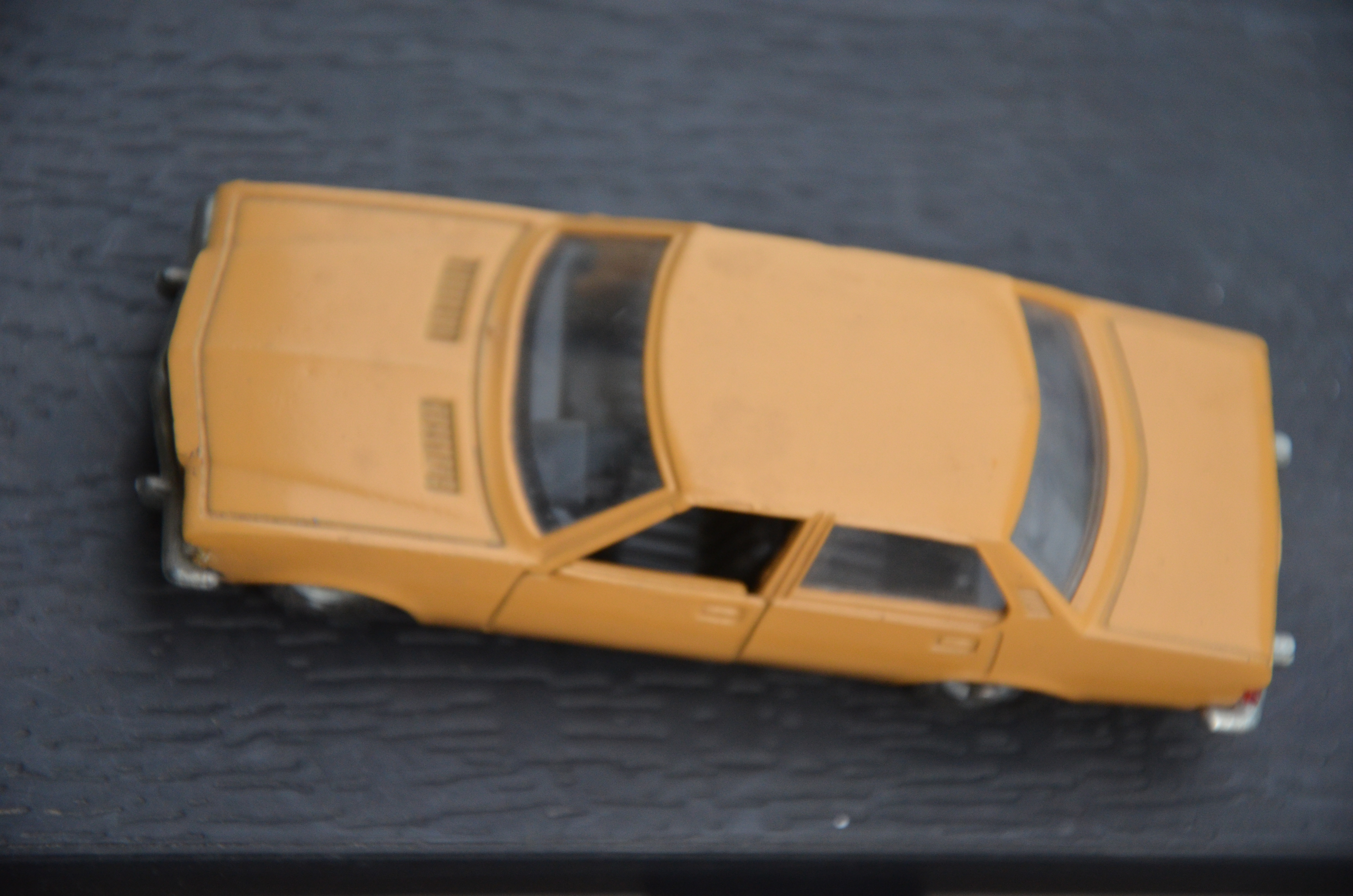
Ziss Opel Rekord II 1-43 scale model, Germany, about 1982

Though Ziss-Modell is more known for its classic line, like the French Minialuxe it also offered a few contemporary cars and trucks. From the outset, R. W. Modell made a Ford Transit van, contemporary German Hanomag stake and delivery trucks in both shorter wheelbase and longer articulated forms, a Volkswagen transporter flatbed, a tractor and a Mercedes-Benz 600 Pullman limousine. A simply cast Jeep was also available.

Later Ziss offerings included an Opel Rekord II four door sedan from about 1972 with opening front doors, and a two-door Opel Commodore. An Opel Manta B was produced later, but in very small numbers. The rather arbitrary nature of the contemporary offerings makes one wonder if they were offered mainly because of promotional contracts with Opel or Mercedes-Benz. Why not other Porsches, Audis, Volkswagens, BMWs or Mercedes-Benzes? Because Schabak had Audi and Cursor had Volkswagen and other companies covered Mercedes-Benz? Ziss models also appear to have been for special purposes.

== Promotional models ==
Besides the normal liveries appearing on the sides of some trucks, Ziss did some models which were promotionals for specific companies. Ziss made a rather simple diecast Jeep and one version was a marketing promotional for Wicküler beer - complete with '3 Musketeers'-like figures holding up beer steins. The Ford Transit van was offered with Funny Frisch chips logo on the sides. Various liveries appeared on the M.A.N. and Henschel trucks including British Petroleum, Aral Oil, Wicküler beer, and Schenker transport. One M.A.N. omnibus was for the Wiblingen-Ulm-Wiblingen circuit to the famed cathedral.

Ziss also made a few construction vehicles which were apparently used for company promotion. One example was a Clark C-500 540D forklift made in a gray-green in 1/24 scale and also a pair of O&K excavator-loaders in both wheeled and tracked versions. Also offered was a yellow P&H excavator loader, which appeared very similar to the O&K machines. A couple of tractors - an orange and gray Fiat 550, and a Deutz Series 06 were also offered in bright card boxes with photos of the tractors on the sides.

== Packaging ==
It seems earlier boxes were blue and labeled with the Mini-Auto name along with Wittek Modell, but this design is rare. Some R.W. Modell vehicles had red boxes with plastic windows with no illustration of the vehicle. These boxes were in German script with brief vehicle specifications. Other R.W. boxes had red and white vertical stripes on two sides with solid red on the alternate sides - with an illustration of the vehicle. Ziss Modell boxes were blue, yet decorated in the same manner as the earlier R.W. boxes.

Vehicles sometimes came with railings or other parts in packages with illustrations on how to affix the parts to the model. This is the case with the 1911 Benz Landaulet which came with separate, ornately curved, diecast zamac roof racks. Some of the R.W. Hanomag truck boxes were multicolored, but the striped boxes described above were most common. Some of the last vehicles in the late 1970s or possibly the early 1980s were sold in plastic display boxes.

== Execution and detail ==
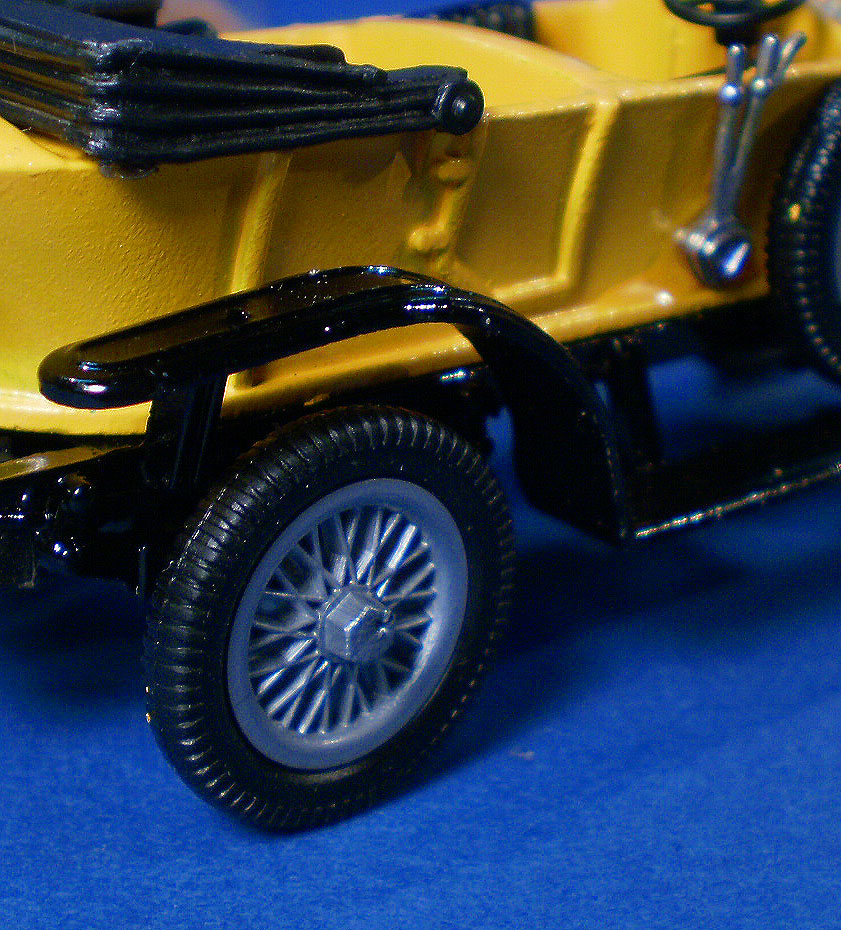
Ziss-Modell / Audi Alpensieger wheel detail. These plastic 'wire' wheels looked better than the earlier cheaper looking plastic spoke wheel design

The model selection of mainly German marques in the R.W. and Ziss line-up earns kudos, especially some in the R.W. Modell line like the Hanomag "Kommissbrot". This model was ultra detailed with fine features like lights, horn, opening rear engine lid, tilting seats and a spare tire behind the seats. Still, the execution and detail of some models lacked confidence. Ziss models often have a cheap looking plastic 'wooden spoke' wheel style that does not even look as good as Matchbox Models of Yesteryear's metal wheels. Later models offered a more realistic plastic wire wheel design.

Color choice was sometimes criticized as was the rendition of Ziss lamps, grilles and other finer pieces of the models, which Gibson called "uncomfortable". Another uncomfortable feature was the raised ribs for door joints on some models like the Audi Alpensieger - a ridge to give the impression of the door line is unfortunate though the same practice is also seen on Spot-On models. Still, no other diecast company before or since has offered such classic German selections. They are done well, some of them very well and are reasonably priced on the normal auction sites.

== Demise of Ziss ==
Most sources say the company stopped producing about 1978. Some models may have been produced into the early 1980s. Previous Ziss models appeared in the early 1980s modeled as "Euro-Modell". These often blotted the molded Ziss name from the metal base of the model, but some Euro-Modell's bases still said Ziss. Whether it was Ziss with another new name or a completely different company is uncertain, but some reported that models such as the Audi Alpenseiger were sold as promotional models in contemporary Audi dealers. It is uncertain if this 'Euro-Modell' (hyphenated) was related to the more contemporary 'Euro Modell' HO (1:87 scale) plastic model producer.
