= Progetto K =

Progetto K 1:43 scale diecast Maserati Tipo 61 'Birdcage'. Made in the mid-1990s, this was one of the last diecast producers to make models in Europe.

Progetto K Automodelli, or sometimes simply referred to as PK ("Project K" in English), was an Italian diecast model company. Brands produced were usually Italian cars of the 1950s through the 1970s. Most models were diecast in plastic or resin – some had diecast bases and some were plastic. Though earlier models were made in Rome, the company's main factory was eventually moved to Sesto Fiorentino, a village just to the north of Florence in Firenze. The first models were made about 1977; the last about 2011.

== History in resin ==
Progetto K was started by Fabrizio Petrucci who has previously made a variety of hand-crafted models in resin under the name King Model produced in the Centocelle region of Rome in the 1970s. Petrucci is recognized as among the earlier modelers to make 1:43 scale cars for the collectible market. King Model produced Italian auto subjects mainly from the 1930s through the 1950s, and were usually early Alfa Romeos and FIATs. Some King Model selections were: the Fiat 1500, 1500E musone, 1100, 1100 BLR taxi, 508L, 500C, 508C long tail, 500C wagon, 1900B granluce, Alfa Romeo 2300B, 8C 2300, and a Lancia Aurelia B24 spider.

About 1977, Petrucci started Progetto K and started the mass production of models in resin and metal. The early factory was on the east side of Rome just inside the A90 beltway. Later, production was moved to Sesto Fiorentino on the north side of Florence. Even as mainly a small family business, PK became nearly as accomplished in output as the metal diecast model makers Rio Models, Brumm or Vitesse Models. Yet the location of Progetto K in central Italy is not typical as most accomplished diecast and collectible model makers originated in the industrial north usually in the vicinity of greater Milan.

== Model selections ==
Models produced by Progetto K were most often Italian brands such as Alfa Romeo, Fiat (and Spanish SEAT), Lancia, Autobianchi, Ferrari, and Maserati mainly from the 1950s through the 1980s, but considering paint and livery variations, Alfa Romeo seemed to be the favorite brand offered, particularly the Giulia sedan and wagon and Bertone 2000 GTA. Some of these were selections in Petrucci's previous King Model line, but more models and variations were gradually added to the Progetto K line. The following are most of Progetto K's offerings.

Alfa Romeos offered were the 1950s 2 van, 1960s F12 van (high top and normal roof), Giulia sedan, wagon, and panel versions; 1960s GTA, 2000 Berlina sedan, 1970s Alfetta 2000 sedan and GTV coupe, 1977 Giuletta Stradale, and the 1980s model 75 sedan.

1:43 scale Ferrari 225 S Roadster. This model's body is made of resin.

FIAT models were the 1950s 1100 sedan, 238 van, 600D and 750D two doors, 600 Abarth, 600 Seat (Spain) car based utility van, 600 van, 1960s 850 sport coupe, Abarth 1300, Campagnola (with and without canvas top), Dino Spyder Stradale, and 1970s Ritmo.

Ferraris appearing were two: the 1958 250 TR coupe and 225 roadster. The only Lancia seen consisted of variations on the Fulvia coupe from the mid-1960s through the 1970s, The only Maserati offered was the Tipo 61 'Birdcage', and the only Autobianchis were the 1957 Bianchina cabriolet and coupe.

== Marketing ==
Similar to Brumm, Progetto K made selected models in many many racing, promotional, fire, fire prevention, Red Cross, polizia and Carabinieri liveries. Designs included Fiat and Alfa Romeo race support vehicles, which carried tires, spare parts, fuel drums, and various other supplies secured on their rooftops.

In the 1970s, Progetto K resin pieces were limited to about 200, but during the 1980s, PK entered mass production and the international market. Some of these models were resin and some were diecast. Since about the year 2000, many liveries have been offered – now between 1,000 and 2,000 pieces each. Models were often praised but at prices between $40.00 to $50.00, some complained that detail was not as good as Brumm or others. Some models seemed spot on in detail and proportion, while others suffered from an incomplete or slightly rubbery look. Still, today many Progetto K models can had on eBay below $20.00 and while early models can be rare, most are relatively easy to acquire. Many colorful catalogues were produced displaying complete offerings available.

Progetto K models were intended for collectors only and earlier boxes advised that they were not for children under 14. A few of the later models were not suitable for under sixteen. The proscription explicitly said that these are not toys.

== Model details ==
Early Progetto K models were resin, but as time passed, materials were used in different ways. The Maserati Tipo 61 'Birdcage' had a heavy diecast body with a thin plastic base. The body for this model is thickly molded. The 'Birdcage' tubing protruded back into the cockpit and the seats were pressed into place on plastic pegs on the chassis. Realistic side pipes on the passenger side, roll bar, and gas cap adorn the body. Headlights were made of clear plastic. Some of the body vent detail is done with decals and could look better. The tires on earlier models were made out of rubber and the 'wire' wheels had deeper shaded indentations around the wires.

Comparing this with the later Ferrari 225S convertible, its body was resin while the base was diecast. The Ferrari's seats are part of the diecast metal chassis molding and they protrude up into the cockpit. Despite the company's reduction of plastic usage, they decided to make it out of plastic. The wheels of both models are a wire design, but not as deeply molded and realistic as those on the Maserati. The tires were designed to be made up of plastic instead of rubber. Headlights, again a plus, are done in a detailed manner with delicate clear plastic lenses on top of plastic bezel bases.

The change in materials seems to indicate cost cutting with the passage of time. Over the decades less metal was used and less rubber. Plastic became more prominent and some of the detailing suffers. Earlier models had better packaging with hard clear plastic cases put into cardboard containers often with an information card. Early box colors were blue with white lettering or yellow with black lettering. Later boxes were simpler flimsier cardboard in a cream tone with blue lettering and plastic paper windows. By that time, the hard plastic clear acrylic display boxes were apparently no longer offered.

== Economic downturn ==
What started in the 1970s as a family owned business and one of the earliest experiments with collector diecast ended in July 2011, a casualty of the global economic downturn. Finances became difficult and the firm ceased production. At this time Progetto K had become part of the Pego Italia Group which also made Portuguese Exem, PinKo, and Mamone. Still, the company was one of the last lower cost, mass production trending model companies to continue production in Europe when most others had closed their doors, gone ultra expensive or moved to Asia.
