= Eligor Models =

Eligor is a brand of collector's diecast model cars and trucks mostly made in 1:43 scale (though a few early models were offered in 1:20 scale). Models have always been made in France, but the company has gone through several ownership changes. Today, though now focusing on model trucks, Eligor is one of the few diecast modelers still making its vehicles in Europe.

== Origins ==
Eligor was established about 1976, in Martignat, France (about 30 miles west of Geneva), by Jacques Greilsamer, who had previously written the Catalogue of Model Cars of the World. The location is interesting as Martignat is just south of Oyonnax, the home of plastic model maker Minialuxe and origin of Norev. Greilsamer used older molds previously used by Norev in making plastic models. Eligor's models, however, were diecast metal. In an interesting parallel development in Germany, the Danhausen Catalog would eventually give birth to the Minichamps brand in Germany.

In occult circles, Eligor is a powerful demon, but here the name simply reflected Greilsamer's 1976 combination of the names of two garages of his father - "ELITE" and "VIGOR".

The company was later purchased by Louis Surber, who had reproduced earlier Quiralu model cars and trucks. For a time the company was headquartered in Paris. Early catalogs stated in French that Eligor's purpose was "Model Production". Further boxes and catalogs stated that the company made "the Miniature Automobile of the Connoisseur". Later Eligor was acquired by HobbyCar S.A. in Lausanne, Switzerland. In this period, when stating the name of "Hobbycar S.A." packaging and catalogs proposed the idea of "Creation – Diffusion", which sounds more like Christian Evangelicalism instead of model car production.

In 1996 Eligor was bought by Paul and Anne Marie Vullierme, the founder of Vulli and the son of Joseph Vullierme who created Jouets MontBlanc that had made miniature cars in the early 1960s. In 1998, they relocated the company to Izernore, France just to the east of the old home of Martignat Their son John Vullierme operated the U.S. office of the company in Earlysville, Virginia.

== Diecast approach ==
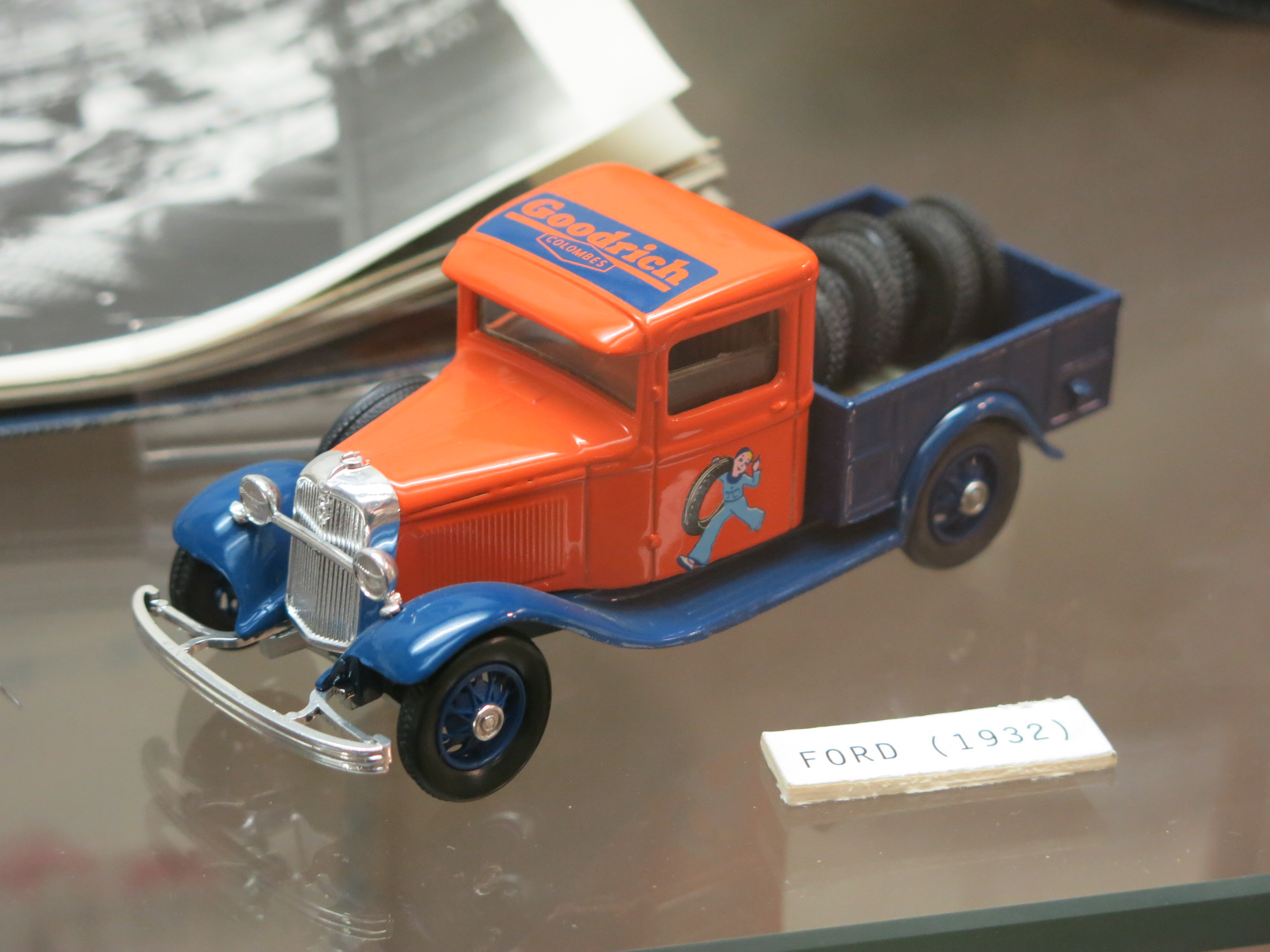
1932 Ford V8 Pickup by Eligor

Eligor began making diecast vehicles in much the same vein as Italian Brumm, Portuguese Vitesse or Italian RIO. Models were designed not for children, but with the adult hobbyist in mind. French vehicles from the 1930s to the 1960s were common in the Eligor line, such as Bugattis and Delages from the 1930s all the way up to Citroens, Peugeots, and some unique Panhards from the 1960s. Similar to Brumm and RIO models Eligors were frequently offered in 'top-up' and 'top-down' versions, but collecting promoter David Sinclair noted that early on some models like the 1928 Rolls-Royce and the 1930 Talbot apparently shared the same basic casting dies. This was very unlike the realism of RIO and Brumm, but Eligor greatly improved in quality and precision through the 1980s.

The brand lineup was not excessively ethnocentrically French like Solido became, however, and has offered German BMWs and Opels, British Triumphs, Ford Cortinas, Jaguars, the Mini, and a Rolls-Royce and Bentley. Italian Lancias and an American Chrysler, Chevrolet Corvair and a Ford Model A were also offered. As with Brumm and Vitesse, many different liveries make a model go a long way, and this has been no different for Eligor. Military offerings like the French F.F.I. Citroen Traction Avant appeared. The Ford Model A around 1990 was offered in at least 29 different variations, including tow truck, ambulance, milk truck, several fire variations, a pickup, and van.

The model selection is not as early 19th century as RIO or Brumm, but the feeling is similar. With the occasional American car like the 1958 Chrysler Newport convertible in the same line with a 1925 Citroen, perhaps Eligor is most like Vitesse or the shorter lived Rextoys in its offerings and 'feel'.

== Case study ==
The 1963 Triumph TR-5 Monte Carlo ragtop is a good model to analyze for comparative detail. The model's exterior is superior. It is exceptionally well proportioned, with yellow lenses for front 'fog' lamps and nicely painted rear taillights. Monte Carlo decals are simply stuck on, but are tasteful. Quite rare for the time period and unlike Brumm, however, all features open and the ragtop is removable. In this area, the Triumph is a much better deal cost-wise, though Brumm cars carry more accuracy in their specific racing heritages. The Triumph interior is well apportioned.

Wheels are plastic but with an impressive and authentic wire design capped by spinners. Another notable feature of the Triumph is that all opening parts, hood trunk, and doors, have their interior sides painted black – where other manufacturers either simply paint these areas in body color or leave them unpainted with sloppy paint over-spray. Less authentic looking is the engine compartment which appears as a cheap diecast base with various 'bumps' sprayed silver.

=== Packaging and logo ===
The typical Eligor box was not very handsome – in fact rather cartoonish. Standard cardboard box colors were heavily saturated blue and green without much of a busy appearance. Cars came inside a normal plastic display case within the cardboard carton. The logo and script was not particularly attractive, but it was unique. Letters in the word 'Eligor' were in a fat "Pac-Man"-style font, often in green and outlined with white. To the right extending away from the logo, a simple drawn hand grasped a small car. Circa 2010 the logo lettering has changed a bit to more handsome serif letters, but the hand grasping the car remained.

== Eligor today ==
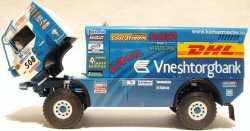
This Kamaz rally truck shows the company's later emphasis – car models are no longer produced.

Many of the cars offered 20 years ago are still offered today, but new models have also been released, including classic Bugattis and racing Mercedes-Benzes. The focus, however, is still on French Peugeots, Citroens, Renaults and older French makes including the likes of Panhard and Talbot. Eligor offers several variations on the Dacia Logan, which is a Renault made in Romania. New and old models continue to be offered in a variety of detailed liveries. As time has passed Eligor resembles revered (but less sophisticated) Solido and Vitesse less and less and Brumm and Rio Models more and more.

Into the new millennium, Eligor now offers a complete set of trucks and buses, mostly in 1:64 scale – about 30 different models are available in several hundred different liveries. One emphasis is on racing trucks and racing liveries (Kamaz and Renault) while standard articulated tractor trailer rigs seem a backbone. Mercedes, Freightliner, and Renault vans are also offered. DAF, MAN, Freightliner, Mercedes, Volvo, Kamaz, Renault, historic Sinpar and Hotchkiss, Iveco, and Scania are all represented. The change from 1930s vehicles to trucks is interesting, but not unprecedented. Model car companies Tekno (from Denmark), and Lion Toys (the Netherlands) also made the transition from car models to exclusively offering trucks.

In this area, the company has built up its promotional offerings, especially with silk screening on the sides of the trucks – sort of becoming the French Winross. The Eligor website runs through more than 25 different liveries that have been produced for different (mostly European) companies.
