= Doğukan =

- Pronunciation: do'ukan
- Gender: Male
- Language: Turkish

Origin
- Origin: Turkish
- Derivation: 1. "Doğu"; 2. "kan"
- Meaning: 1. "sovereign of the east" 2. "blood of the east"

Other names
- Nickname: Doğu
- Related names: Batu, Batıkan, Batuhan, Doğu

Doğukan is a common masculine Turkish given name. It is composed of two words: doğu ("east") and kan ("blood" or "khan"). Thus, "Doğukan" can mean either "sovereign/ruler of the east" or "blood of the east".

== People ==
- Doğukan Coşar, Turkish judoka with Down syndrome
- Doğukan Ergin (born 1992), Dutch politician
- Doğukan Pala (born 1992), Turkish footballer
- Doğukan Sinik (born 1999), Turkish footballer
- Doğukan Sönmez (born 1992), Turkish basketball player
