= Doğu =

- Gender: Male

Origin
- Language: Turkish
- Meaning: the East

Other names
- Related names: Batu, Batıkan, Batuhan, Doğukan

Doğu is a Turkish family name and masculine given name. In Turkish, "Doğu" means "East" or "The East"

== People ==
=== Given name ===
- Doğu Perinçek, Turkish politician
- Doğu Budak, Turkish film maker

=== Surname ===
- Cengiz Doğu (1945–2019), German poet and activist
- Ersan Dogu, Turkish football player
- Fuat Doğu (1914–2004), Turkish military officer
- Sinem Doğu, Turkish female ice hockey player
- Yaşar Doğu, Turkish sport wrestler

== Ships ==
- SS Doğu, a Turkish passenger ship requisitioned by Germany on completion in 1939
