= Dagu =

Dagu may refer to:

- Nyala language (Sudan), also known as Dagu, an Eastern Sudanic language of Darfur
- Daju people

== China ==
- Dagu Subdistrict (大沽街道), a subdistrict in Binhai, Tianjin
  - Taku Forts, also known as Dagu Forts, historical coastal forts located in Binhai
- Dagu, Sichuan (打古), a town in Naxi District, Luzhou, Sichuan
- Dagu Township (大沽乡), a township in Ningdu County, Jiangxi
- Dagu River, a river in Shandong

=== Chinese culture ===
- Dagu (instrument) (大鼓), a bass drum, see List of Chinese musical instruments
- Dagu (music), a form of Shuochang, or storytelling accompanied by music

== See also ==
- Battle of Dagu Forts (1900), or Battle of Taku Forts, a conflict during the Boxer Rebellion
- Daguan (disambiguation)
- Degu (disambiguation)
- Dogu (disambiguation)
- Dugu (disambiguation)
