= Dugu =

Dugu may refer to:

- Dugu ceremony, a funerary ceremony practiced by the Garifuna people
- Dugu (surname), a Chinese surname of Xianbei/Xiongnu origin
- Dugu, Hebei, a town in Xinle, Hebei, China
- Dugu Miniautotoys, Italian diecast model maker
- Dugu or Duggu, nickname of Indian actor Hrithik Roshan (born 1974)

== See also ==
- Dagu (disambiguation)
- Degu (disambiguation)
- Dogu (disambiguation)
