= Safir (models) =

French scale model company

Société Anonyme de Fabrication d'Injection et de Recherches (Safir)
- Defunct: 1978; 48 years ago
- Headquarters: France
- Products: die-cast and plastic scale model cars

Société Anonyme de Fabrication d'Injection et de Recherches (English: Injection Study and Fabrication Company Limited, mostly known for its acronym Safir, sometimes called Safir Champion) was a French manufacturing company that produced diecast metal classic veteran and contemporary plastic race cars and other vehicles in the 1960s through the 1970s. It arose out of the previous French toymaker, "Jadali".

== History ==
Delicately done diecast. Models of veteran cars are often done in plastic to express intricate detail more easily and cheaply, but the Safir 1898 Panhard is diecast metal

In 1952, a French company called Jadali was started by Léon Gouttman and his son Jacques-Henri Gouttman. 'Jadali' was an acronym of "Jacques, Daniel, and Linette, the names of Gouttman's three children. Jadali made a variety of toys, including cars and trucks, space man, and cowboy pistols that were often D.C.M.T. (Lone Star Toys) or Matchbox retoolings, done under license. These toys were first made in Nanterre on the western edge of Paris and later in Issy les Moulineaux, to the southwest of Paris. Another source says they were made in Montreuil.

In 1955–1957, Léon Gouttman shifted toy production to Barcelona, Spain, in Catalonia, where the toys were known as Jadali Metamol. In 1957, the son, Jacques-Henri Gouttman, meanwhile, had established a diecasting business in Langeac in Haute-Loire in southeastern France. This company was called Jadali S.I.F.M.A. and mainly produced diecast and chrome parts for the automobile and home appliance industries.

In 1959 Jean-Henri started production of two 1:43 scale vehicles: a Ford Model T and a 1902 Renault Paris-Vienne racer. In 1960, Gouttman enters an agreement with a Mr. De Beque who owns a plastic moulding and diecasting company called "Safir". Juge Jean-Paul was the original technical director of Safir. From this time, Gouttman provided Safir with zamac metal parts for a new range of classic vehicles – plastics continue to be molded by De Beque. Among the offerings are the designs of the original Model T and 1902 Renault – now with plastic parts.

Gradually Gouttman drifted to other diecasting products and Safir concentrates on plastics. Safir continued production of vehicles until about 1978. Thus most Safir assembly was done in Montreuil, just east of central Paris with diecast metal parts supplied by the former Jadali diecasting site in Langeac. As the Gouttman interests changed, the Paris factory focused on plastic vehicles only.

== Model selections ==
Safir made models of mostly classic French vehicles with the occasional Italian or German marque thrown in. This was similar to fellow French companies like Minialuxe or RAMI by J.M.K. The classic lineup was in 1:43 scale and consisted of: an 1892 Peugeot, 1896 Peugeot Paris-Marseilles, 1898 Panhard, 1892 Peugeot Toit Bois, 1899 Peugeot Victoria, 1900 Peugeot Coupe, 1901 Fiat 8 hp, 1901 Decauville, 1901 Delahaye, 1901 Mercedes, 1901 Daimler, 1899 Renault, 1902 Renault K24CV Paris-Vienne racer, 1900 Renault 10, 1906 Renault 35 hp, 1908 Unic Taxi and a Ford Model T. The model T and the Paris-Vienne Renault were the first designs from the Jadali S.I.F.M.A. enterprise, before Safir became involved. Though the Safirs had more plastic, the two eras of Model T and Renault Paris-Vienne are nearly identical. Veteran collector Cecil Gibson called the model of the odd upright 1900 Renault 10 "a rather ugly little model of a rather ugly little car". One final outrageous model was the 1910 Gregoire Triple Berline, a triple arched roof, triple compartmented limousine with a huge storage trunk on the roof.

One additional model, a 1923 Citroën B2 (also seen produced by RAMI by J.M.K. and Minialuxe), was offered in many versions. One was an ambulance with prominent red cross emblems and another was a green and yellow "Postes Transport des Dépéches" version. Further is the interesting fire (pompiers) version with decals spelling out "Regiment des Sapeurs Pompiers de Paris" ("Regiment of the Paris Fire Brigade"). The pompiers version came in two general variations – an earlier one with blacked out grille and side 'hoses' and a later version with grille all gold, blacked out running boards and a spare tire on the side instead of hoses. The pompiers model was also built in Spain by Guisval. On the side of the Spanish version, decals said, "Parque de Bomberos" ("Firehouse"). Very similar also was a 1924 Citroën B2 Taxi offered in red, yellow, and black and gold.

== Contemporary Line ==
Like many of the companies producing classic / veteran diecast vehicles like Minialuxe or Ziss Modell, Safir also had contemporary offerings, usually in plastic. These were often called Safir Champion and may have entailed a company takeover as many of the contemporary models say Champion on their bases with no mention of Safir. Included were models of Land Rovers and a Renault Estafette delivery van. A Citroen 2CV 'Deux Chevaux' with decals of the Paris-Persepolis rally was also appealing and typical of the Safir Champion models.

Twelve smaller Grand Prix / F1 models like the Matra MS11 V12 driver by Jean-Pierre Beltoise and a LeMans style T-70 Spyder were available in smaller 1:66 scale called "Championettes". Finally, Safir was known for its detailed plastic 1:43 scale models called "Champion" and "Super Champion". There were 18 different models, but mostly these were LeMans Ferrari 512Ms, Porsche 917s in short and long tail, Chaparral 2Ds, and Ford Mark II GTs. These latter cars were made in the 1970s, packaged in clear plastic display cases, called Safir Racing, and were apparently the company's last products.

== Detail and Rendering ==
Wheels cleverly rendered with lines etched into clear plastic discs as spokes

The original Safir models had good detail. Most of the time their bodies were plastic as were most pieces, but certain parts – usually the fenders – on veteran models were diecast metal. Undercarriages had surprising detail, probably the best of any contemporary model in 1:43 scale, showing – in plastic – chains and other drivetrain parts.

Unfortunately the Peugeot, Delahaye, and Decauville models shared seats, parasols, fenders and body parts which the original vehicles did not – and so did not appear as uniquely designed models – with reduced realism. For all these models, rear fenders flared upward, as did front fenders as well, which is more reminiscent of the actual Decauville and Delahaye, but not the actual Peugeot's which were more full and rounded in shape.

Some Safir wheels were normal plastic spoke designs similar to the cheap renderings of early Ziss models. Unique to Safir and only seen elsewhere on a few Minialuxe models, were the clear plastic discs with radial 'spokes' appearing simply as etched or molded lines. The look is somewhat similar to jeweled headlights on Corgi or Dinky models – rather attractive, but not having much realism.

== Promotions and Packaging ==
All plastic version of the Safir 1898 Peugeot made in Hong Kong

Earlier Safirs came in attractive orange boxes with white lettering and white and black trim. They had pictures of different models around the base of the box. Some special Safir CIKY boxes were thicker board but came in the form of an old French garage that could be formed with sloped roof with the appearance of terra cotta tiles. Later models came in typical clear plastic display cases.

Some Safirs came with special packaging aimed at promoting different companies. Mobil Oil was one client and special rust colored or blue boxes with white trim said "Mobil" on the end flaps. Later, the clear plastic cases had "Mobil" embossed on the lower part of the display plastic. Other promotions were Nestlé and Sopad, a food division of French Nestlé.

== Copies ==
Sometime in the late 1970s to early 1980s, a few different Hong Kong companies acquired some of the Safir tooling and reproduced the Peugeots, Delahaye and Decauville models. These were easier to construct because they shared parts (fenders, seats, etc.) which damaged accuracy and realism. A further crudeness, was the melted plastic evident at the joints of plastic parts and the wheel hubs. The models were offered in clear plastic display boxes almost identical to those that previous Safirs came in. The models and the boxes were marked "Hong Kong" on the bases.

Some of these Hong Kong models also appeared as Straco remote control vehicles in blue carded packages with red remote controls. A significant part of the cars' undercarriages had to be discarded to make room for the electric motors.
