= Dugu Miniautotoys =

Dugu Miniautotoys was a brand of diecast metal models, mostly in 1:43 scale, made in Varallo Sesia, Vercelli Province, Piedmont, Italy, north of Turin and west of Lake Orto. The company made models for the Carlo Biscaretti di Ruffia Automobile Museum in Turin. They were made from approximately 1961–1975, and perhaps a few years longer.

== History and rationale ==
In the early 1960s, Bartolomeo Chiodo, an auto enthusiast, named his company Dugu from the name of one of the two districts of Varallo Sesia that was Mr. Chiodo's home – 'Dugu' means owl; the other district was 'falcet' – meaning falcon. So, 'Owl Models' was born in 1961 and the logo for the company became a stylized angular owl with large round yellow eyes. This follows somewhat of a tradition of other European toy companies naming named their lines after cute or diminutive animals (e.g. Corgi, Husky, or Budgie).

The first Dugu Miniautotoys were made by Stampopolastica for a year, and like the name some of the first Dugus were molded in plastic. In 1962, Stampopolastica started making its own models under the Rio name). Chiodo then started making his own models and thus the Dugu line was similar in concept to Rio Models, Brumm, or Minialuxe. Later a new line made Italian makes for the Ruffia Automobile Museum. These models were mostly vehicles featured in the museum and sold in the museum store. 1970s collector Cecil Gibson stated that normal Dugus for retail sale were more complex, while the ones available for the Museum (the 'Museo' series) were less detailed, which seems 'cart before the horse'. Still, the company was similar to the German Cursor Models or French RAMI by J.M.K. which mainly made models for the Mercedes-Benz Museum in Germany and, respectively, models in the Malartre collection in the Château de Rochetaillée-sur-Saône in France.

Dugu and Rio, thus were two of the earliest model makers of veteran age cars, setting the stage for Solido, Corgi, Brumm and several other manufacturers to make toys representing the nascent auto era.

== Marques ==
Marques reproduced were mainly Italian, like FIAT, Lancia, Itala, SAME and FIAT tractors, Legnano, Brixia, Cisitalia, and Bernardi, but French and German makes like Peugeot, Darracq, DeDion, and Benz were also produced. A couple of Duesenbergs also appeared, with the input and encouragement of American diecast marketer, David Sinclair, who was responsible for introducing many of these more obscure European brands to American soil. In the Dugu catalog, the Bernardi was proudly hailed as the first Italian motorized vehicle, made in 1896, and the 1899 FIAT 3.5 hp heralded as the first FIAT produced – ever. Also, though most models were of vehicles made before 1930, a few like the Cisitalia, the Fiat 500 Topolino, and the SAME Centauro tractor were post war representations.

As with Rio and Brumm, many models were made in 'top up' or 'top down' versions, though Dugu models, while respected, were generally not seen as quite up to the standards of Rio. The 1911 FIAT 4 was listed as giving important service in World War I. The tractor and truck models (probably not made for the museum) were produced in 1:15 scale. Apparently, with the urging of the Pennsylvanian model collector and importer David Sinclair, two American models were also made – a Duesenberg town car and a Cord 812. At least one model was announced, but never produced. This was the 1923 FIAT Eldridge 'Mefistofele' record car, a model later made by Zeppelin.

== The Cisitalia 202 ==
An analysis of one nice Dugu offering is the 1946 Cisitalia 202 by Pininfarina – a sleek car that was to completely change sports car design during the 1950s. Like most Dugus it was offered in 1:43 scale about the year 1974. The shape of the car is perfectly rendered in miniature with some details very strikingly portrayed while others seem overgeneralized. The Cisitalia grille is oversimplified with large chrome bars. Though the hood is a separate piece – it does not open and there is no engine detail. Dugus were more crude and simplistic than colorful Safirs, all metal RAMI or Rio Models which commonly had opening parts. One author called Dugu models "dainty", probably for all the veteran era details. The Cisitalia's exhaust port tubes on the front fenders behind the wheel wells were impressively blacked out and the Pininfarina logo just below them was accurately portrayed in blue and white, if made a bit large in order to catch the eye on this small model.

The interior is black plastic, as is the base for the chassis. The interior is not very detailed, but it is not very visible in any case. With the instrument cowl on the right side, the car modeled appears to have been right hand drive. The body paint is shiny, but slightly uneven. The wire wheels are plastic unlike those of the Politoys M series, but they are authentic looking being darkened between the spokes and with 'spinner' caps, though the plastic of their rims is not finished smoothly or evenly.

The car's bulb-like headlights are clear plastic which is usually realistic and probably better than the gemstone approach taken by Dinky and Corgi, but though glass-like, on close inspection they protrude, fish-like and make the car look nearsighted. Authentic looking license plates top it all off. It is a very effective model if one doesn't gripe about the details.

Other details were finer than those of models produced by other companies. Sometimes detailed chains were seen in drive systems. Steering wheels were accurate to the real vehicles portrayed and in the case of the 1907 FIAT F2 race car, copper wiring was actually used to show copper tubing to and from the fuel tank of the actual vehicle.

== Packaging ==
The Dugu museum models' packaging is intriguing and apparently done to mimic other 1:43 scale modelers, but also to be appropriate for museum sales. The Cisitalia's box panels alternate in blue and yellow with the name of the museum on the blue sides. The round seal of the museum appears on the end flaps with a representation of the 1899 'first' FIAT. The flat yellow sides of the box show the Cisistalia in profile and the opposite side names the car with bookman-like type font in blue. The overall packaging effect looks more like something from the 1950s than the 1970s.

This box design rather mimics blue and yellow themes seen with other 1:43 diecast producers like Corgi, but lacks much marketing ornamentation or flair – perhaps emphasizing that this model was to be more of an 'official' museum offering. Also the Dugu owl logo only appears in one place on the yellow boxes. Later models were packaged under more clear plastic and the earlier yellow and blue or yellow and green packaging colors gave way to more of a subtle and less toy-like black, white and minimalist yellow paper colors under clear plastic display cases usually with black plastic bases. The black cardboard boxes usually had circular clear plastic windows.

== Demise ==
The Dugu company apparently changed its name to Sispla in 1974, but lasted only until 1975. Some of the last models appeared without the Dugu name neither on box nor model. The reason for this may have been that the last were announced by Dugu, but made by other local manufacturers. A model or two found continued production with other companies, like the Eldridge 1923 FIAT which was announced by Dugu, but then later produced by a Milan shop named Zeppelin. Zeppelin made one thousand copies of the race car. Some of the Dugu Models also appeared later in the series of the brand Oldcars.
