= Batıkan =

- Gender: Male

Origin
- Language: Turkish
- Meaning: Sovereign of the West

Other names
- Related names: Batu, Batuhan, Doğu, Doğukan, Batıhan

Batıkan is a common masculine Turkish given name. It is composed of two words: "Batı" and "Kan". In Turkish, "Batı" means "West" whereas "Kan" means "Sovereign", "Ruler" and/or "Blood". Thus, "Batıkan" means "Sovereign of the West", and/or "Ruler of the West".

== Real People ==
- Batıkan Açıkgöz, a Turkish ice hockey player of ABBA SK
