= Dogu =

Dogu may refer to:

- Dogū, Japanese traditional figurines of the late Jōmon period
- Dōgu, a Japanese term meaning "the instruments of the way" very roughly approximating the concept "tools of the trade"; most commonly used in English to refer to martial arts gear
- Doğu, a Turkish name
  - Yaşar Doğu (1913–1961), champion sports wrestler
  - Doğu Perinçek (born 1942), Turkish politician
  - Sinem Doğu (born 1987), Turkish female ice hockey player and trainer
  - Ersan Dogu (born 1972), Turkish football player
- Doğubeyazıt
- SS Dogu, a Turkish passenger ship requisitioned by Germany on completion in 1939
