= RAMI by J.M.K. =

Rétrospectives Automobiles Miniatures (RAMI)
- Founded: 1958
- Founder: M. Jarry; Henri Malartre; M. Koch
- Defunct: 1969; 57 years ago
- Headquarters: Lure, France
- Products: Diecast scale model cars

Rétrospectives Automobiles Miniatures (English: Automobile Miniatures in Retrospect, mostly known for its acronym RAMI) was a French manufacturing company that made diecast scale model collector vehicles mostly of classic French automobiles in 1:43 scale. The acronym was seen on packaging without the periods between the letters of the acronym, but on some of the vehicle bases with the punctuation. "J.M.K." was a further acronym that stood for the three founding members of the company: M. Jarry, Henri Malartre and M. Koch. Though the models were often known simply as RAMI, the full name of the company was RAMI by J.M.K.

The cars in the line-up represented actual vehicles in the Automobile Museum of the Château de Rochetaillée sur Saône. The models were made in Lure, France, from 1958 to 1969.

== Museum models ==
Sometime around 1957, the decision was made to make – in miniature – automobiles housed in the Automobile Museum Malartre of Rochetaillée sur Saône in eastern France. This was the real auto collection of Henri Malartre who also started RAMI. The concept was similar to Dugu Miniautotoys in Italy made for the Carlo Biscaretti di Ruffia Automobile Museum in Turin, from 1961 to about 1975, or Cursor Models which produced models in Stuttgart seen in the Daimler-Benz Museum from 1969 to about 1980.

The first prototype RAMI vehicles were made in wood in 1958 in Villeurbanne, next to Lyon, by a Monsieur Rivoire. Production models were made in Lure of the department Haute Saône about 175 miles northeast of Lyon, near the border with Switzerland and Germany.

The founders of RAMI cars were M. Jarry who had previously worked for model maker Quiralu; H. Malartre, who had worked in the auto parts business and had collected classic vehicles; and M. Koch, who had worked previously in a weaving factory.

== Model details ==
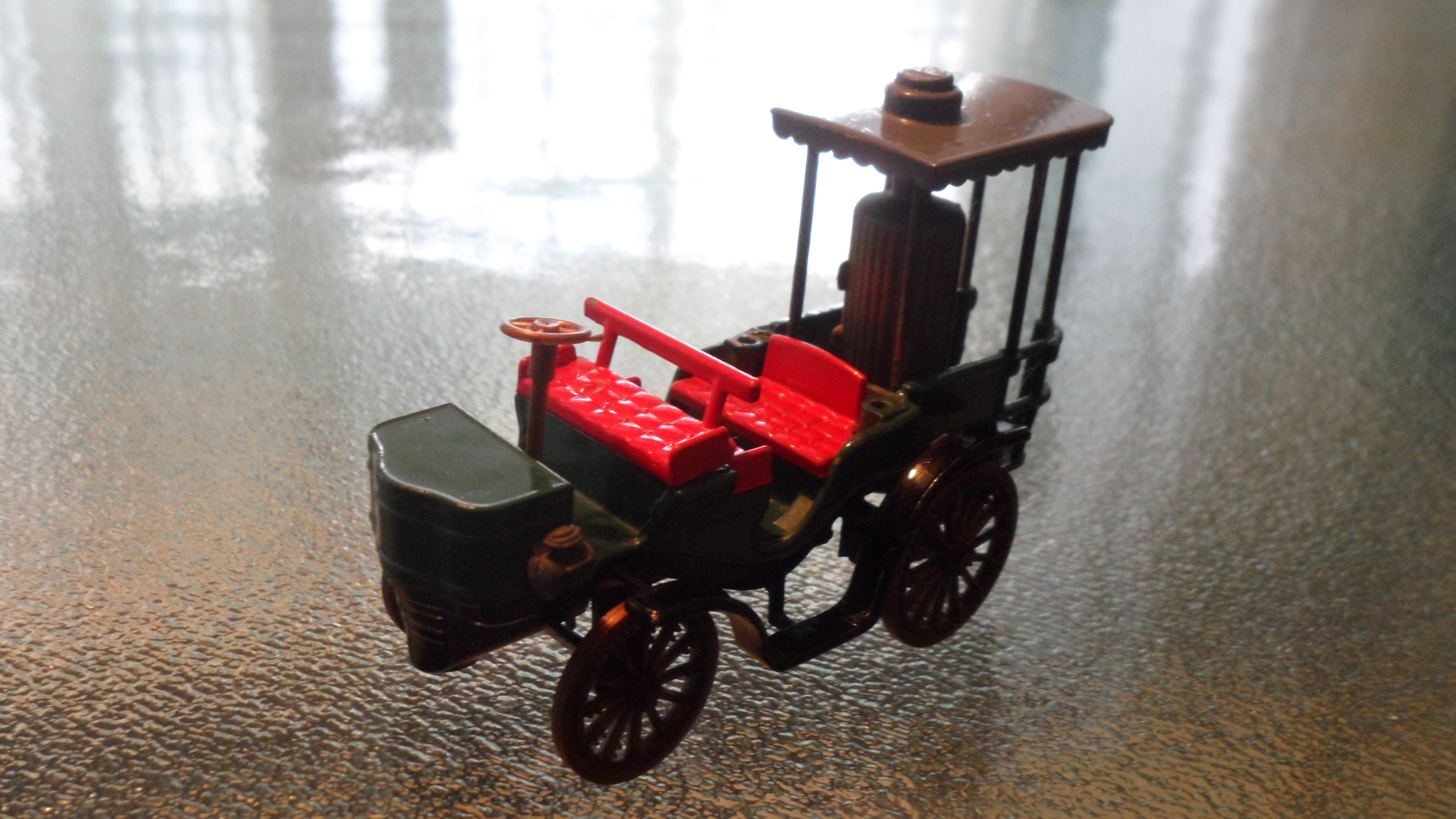
Rare Toy model of the 1873 Amédée Bollée père steam vehicle "La Mancelle" by R.A.M.I. (No. 30) in die-cast, scale c. 1/50. This is the early variant with die-cast wheels rhather than plastic

Though Johnson says models were produced up to 1980, in all, 39 different models were produced between 1958 and 1969. Many models were of veteran 'brass' era vehicles. In fact, 33 were of vehicles made before 1920. Two of the vehicles were steam (1878 Amedee Bollee and the 1892 Scotte steam wagon with large boilers) and one electric (the irresistible 1898 Hautier Taxi), 34 are representations of French vehicles with two American Fords, a Packard, and a Mercedes.

The Hautier Taxi is particularly interesting as a vehicle that is mainly a horse carriage with an electric motor. The driver sits in a makeshift seat up and behind the cab, almost in a 'stagecoach' position. Some kind of crude steering mechanism went down then to the rear wheels. To enter, one stepped up onto the front of the vehicle and entered directly forward through two opening doors – which open on the model.

RAMI models were made of diecast zamac metal alloy – only wheels and tires were plastic. Some early models, like the Marne Taxi are made in diecast halves joining down the middle of the car – this faux pas was avoided on most other models. Seats and thin fenders were diecast metal on R.A.M.I. models, which is a bit rare as many diecast manufacturers of early brass era vehicles (like French Minialuxe) often use plastic. Plastic is easier to work with for 'spidery' parts such as wheel spokes, thin fenders, steering tillers, and long gearshift and brake levers. Occasionally, a dab of glue can be spied at the base of a lever or a tiller. RAMI tops, even those purportedly of cloth were diecast in metal as well. Thus models were heavy, especially if one was used to handling plastic Minialuxe vehicles.

Early diecast collector Cecil Gibson noted the delightful features of RAMI models as early as 1971, pointing out the company's unique selection (from museum vehicles), delicate details (like spare tires and long brake and tiller levers) and whimsical features (as in 'mother-in-law' seats and parasol tops which do not cover the passengers. Neither did RAMI shy away from odd body shapes – whether late 1800s boilers, curved boat-tails, spare wheel covers on roofs, or the varied folds and waves of landaulet covering material (in plastic or diecast metal. Models often had combinations of vibrant colors, and appear much more striking in person than in photographs.

== Lineup ==
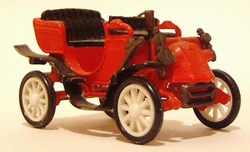
This 1899 Gobron-Brillie Double Phaeton was model No 11 made by RAMI by J.M.K. The original car used a unique engine with two opposed pistons within each cylinder; engine compartment was under the rear seat. This model is a year newer than the 1898 model in the Malartre museum

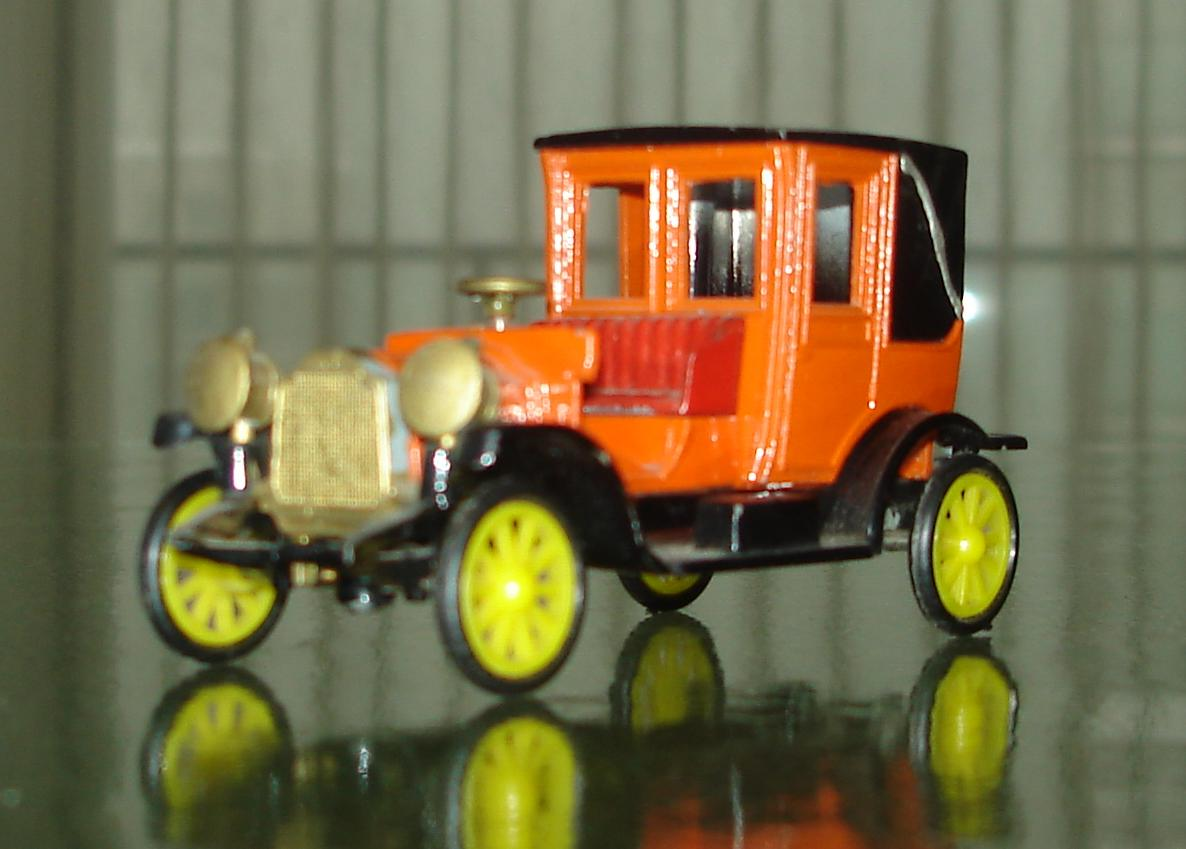
Rare Toy model of a 1912 Packard Landaulet by R.A.M.I. (No. 13) in die-cast, scale c. 1/43. Painted brown and black, with yellow plastic wheels. These models were made by French enthiusiasts. Zamac castings were produced by SIMEB S.A.

- 1958: 1905–1916 Renault de la Marne Taxi type AG, 1900 De dion Bouton, 1902 Motobloc tonneau, 1911 Lion Peugeot Double-phaéton VC3, 1900 De Dion-Bouton Cab, and the 1923–1925 Citroen 5CV 2-seater roadster.
- 1959: 1927–1930 Bugatti 35 C race car, 1925 Citroen 10 Cv B10 sedan, and the 1906 Sizaire et Naudin 1 cylinder race car.
- 1960: 1895 Rochet Schneider with parasol and the 1934 Hispano-Suiza J12 coupé de ville.
- 1961: 1899 Gobron-Brillie double phaéton (spelled Brillée on the box) and a year newer than the 1898 model shown in the museum. Also, the 1897 Gautier Wehrlé cabriolet.
- 1962: 1912 Packard landaulet and the 1898–1901 Peugeot coupé 21.
- 1963: 1908 Ford Model T roadster and 1907 Ford Model T four-seater.
- 1964: 1908 Panhard & Levassor "La marquise", Panhard & Levassor tonneau ballon, 1898 Hautier Electric Taxi, 1904 Delaunay Belleville double-phaéton and the 1902 Georges Richard tonneau.
- 1965: 1892 Scott steamwagon, 1901 Renault tonneau, 1911 Lorraine Dietrich, 1895 Panhard & Levassor tonneau, and the 1904 Delahaye phaéton.
- 1966: 1898 Audibert et Lavirotte, 1911 Léon Bollée four-door sedan, 1912 Spa 25/30 HP race car, and the 1878 Amédée Bollée "La Mancelle" steam wagon.
- 1967: 1901 Luc Court, 1908 Brazier landaulet, 1910 Berliet sedan, and the 1903 Mieussiet cabriolet.
- 1968: 1902 De Dion-Bouton race car, 1898 Lacroix de La ville three-wheeler, and the 1932 Delage roadster.
- 1969: 1927 Mercedes Benz SSK.

== Packaging ==
The majority of RAMI vehicles appeared in red boxes with a cream white 'illustration' section portraying the 1895 Panhard & Levassor open car on two sides. This illustration did not vary, box to box, so what was seen on the box was inside only with the Panhard & Levassor model. Above the Panhard illustration were the letters "RAMI" in white without punctuation. Boxes did, however, come in a few different sizes depending on the size of the model – some were more squarish and others more rectangular. The opposed sides from the illustration were stamped with the name and year of the individual model. The end flaps likewise had the name of the particular model. Though some lists show the models numbered in order of release, neither boxes nor model bases carry numbers of any kind. They do say "1:43" scale. A few of the later offerings were available in clear plastic display cases.

== End of RAMI ==
Koch died in 1967 and Jarry retired about the same time. This left Malartre in charge, apparently slowing production. No new models were produced after 1969. The 1927 Mercedes-Benz SSK was the last RAMI model.
