= Batu (given name) =

- Gender: Male

Origin
- Origin: Turkic, Mongolian, Malay, Bahasa Indonesia and Formosan: Atayal, Bunun, Kavalan, Thao, Truku
- Meaning: Turkic: Prevailing, Preponderant; Mongolian: firm/stable Malay and Bahasa Indonesia: rock, stone or boulder Atayal: egg
- Region of origin: Asia

Other names
- Related names: Batuhan, Batıkan, Baturay
- Popularity: see popular names

Batu is a common masculine Central Asian name.

In Turkish, "Batu" means "Prevailing", and/or "Preponderant". It also connotes "The West" since "Batu" resembles the word "Batı" which means "west" in Turkish.

In Mongolian, "Batu" means firm/stable.

In Malay and Bahasa Indonesia, "Batu" means rock, stone or boulder.

In Atayal, "Batu" means egg.

== Real People ==
=== Given name ===
- Batu Han Yüksel (born 1999), Turkish weightlifter
- Batu Khan, Mongol ruler and founder of the Golden Horde.
- Batu Watan (蘇偉恩), Taiwanese aboriginal city council candidates in Taoyuan City.
- Batumöngke Dayan Khagan, 15th century Mongol khagan.
- Saru Batu Savcı Bey, Ertuğrul's eldest son and older brother of Osman I and Gündüz see Turkish Wikipedia article

==== Entertainment ====
- Batu Akdeniz (born 1993), Turkish rock musician
- Batu Çetin, founder and vocalist of Cenotaph

== Character ==
- Batu (巴圖), an Atayalic character from the Taiwanese television film Batu The Iron Fist (鐵拳巴圖).
