= Doğukan Coşar =

Turkish judoka

Personal information
- Occupation: Judoka

Sport
- Sport: Judo

Doğukan Coşar is a Turkish world champion judoka with Down syndrome. He competes in the 81 kg division of T21 disability category.
