= Brumm =

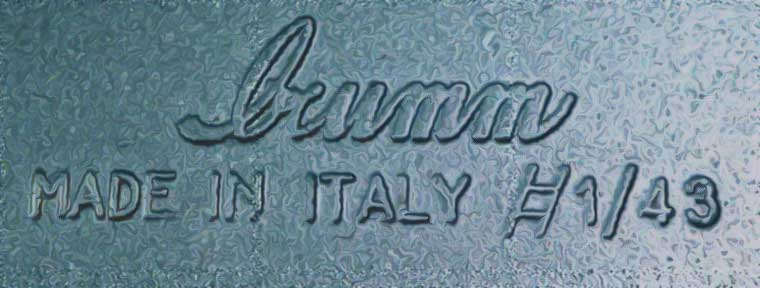

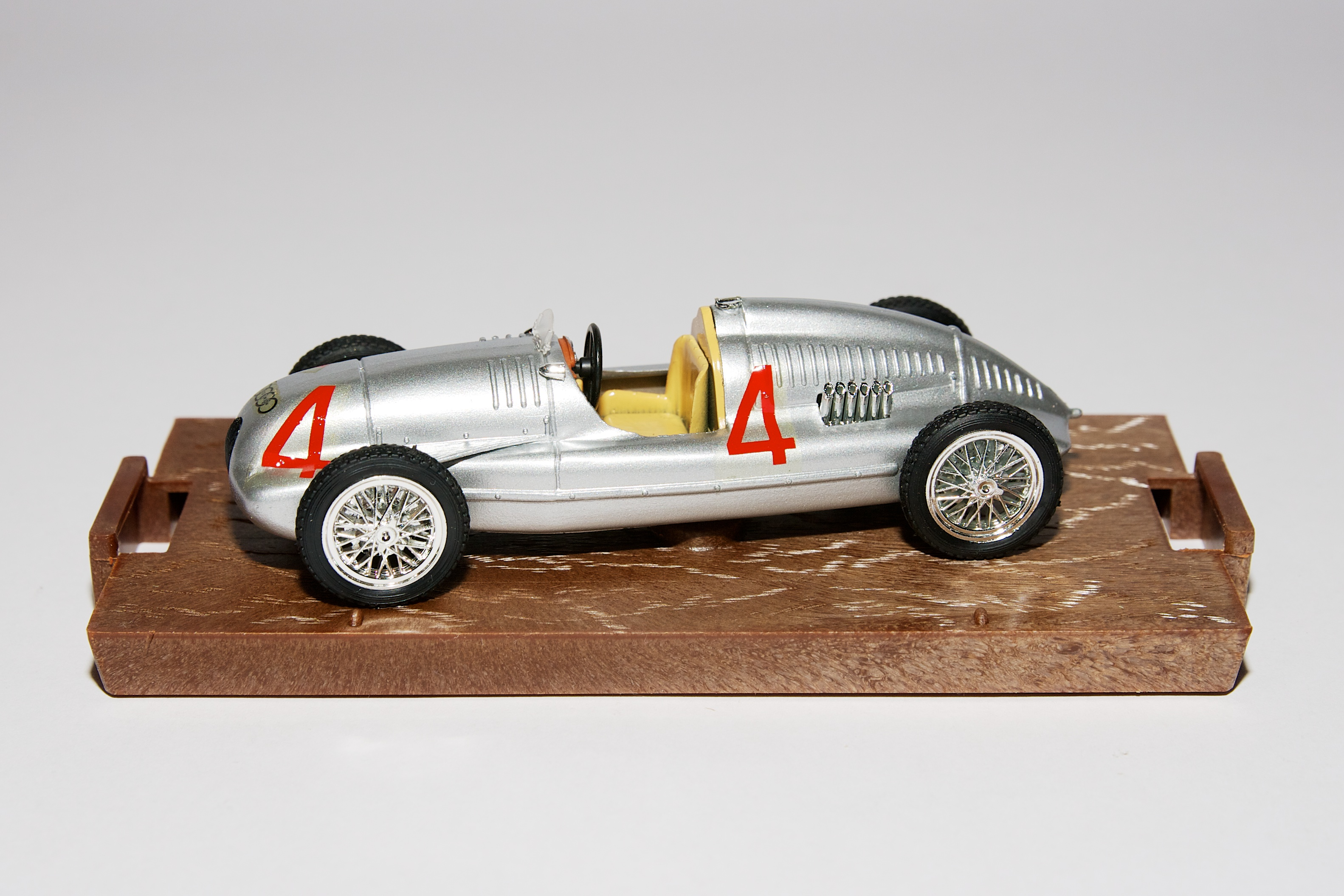
Brumm Auto Union Tipo D from 1938.

Brumm is a collectible model company that makes diecast metal automobiles and horse-drawn carriages. It is based in Oltrona di San Mamette, southwest of Lake Como, Italy - about 25 miles northwest of Milan. Models are almost exclusively produced in 1:43 scale.

== History ==
Veteran collector and U.S. importer David Sinclair reports that Brumm was started in 1972 by Reno Tattarletti of the family concern that started RIO Models (other sources say it was a brother-in-law of the Tattarlettis). Rio Models, in turn, had earlier begat Dugu Miniautotoys to produce models for the Turin auto museum.

The new company was formed with the help of a couple of associates who had already been making miniature horse-drawn carriages. Brumm thus started producing miniature vehicles in Oltrona di San Mamette about seven miles from where RIO was located in Cernobbio. Oddly, neither the RIO nor the Dugu connection is discussed in the company history on the official Brumm website.

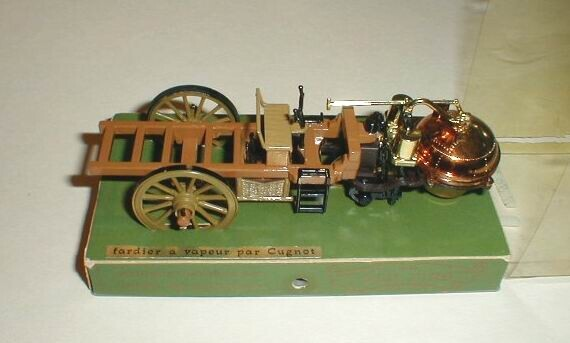
Cugnot's 1769 steam tractor from France (Model X01)

The name Brumm was derived from the Italian for 'Brougham'. As quoted from Brumm's official 1995 catalog, with a silly dark drama partly arising from a sloppy translation of Italian into English – "It was a dark and stormy night...a dense fog screen wound the city of Milan. Nobody dared get out of the house, and in the desert[ed] streets you only heard the squeaking of a black carriage – the Brumm [of] Milan".

== Carriages and steam ==
Carriages then (with horses available), made up the first Brumm line. In 1976, the "Old Fire" series followed, and then the Revival series of motorcars. The Old Fire series at first focused on steam fire engines and other fairly well known pre-gas engine vehicles such as Richard Trevithick's 1803 steam carriage. Soon, the line was expanded into a unique set of steam-powered vehicles – something no toy manufacturer had ever done before. This included Cugnot's 1769 steam tractor from France, proposed for pulling military cannon, and later, two fantastical steam cars: one supposedly made by Ferdinand Verbiest in 1681, and another proposed by Newton in 1680 – neither confirmed to have ever been actually constructed. Such novel choices for steam propulsion did not stop with European concoctions; for example Oliver Evans' 'Oruktor Amphibolos' was a steam dredge demonstrated in Philadelphia in 1804.

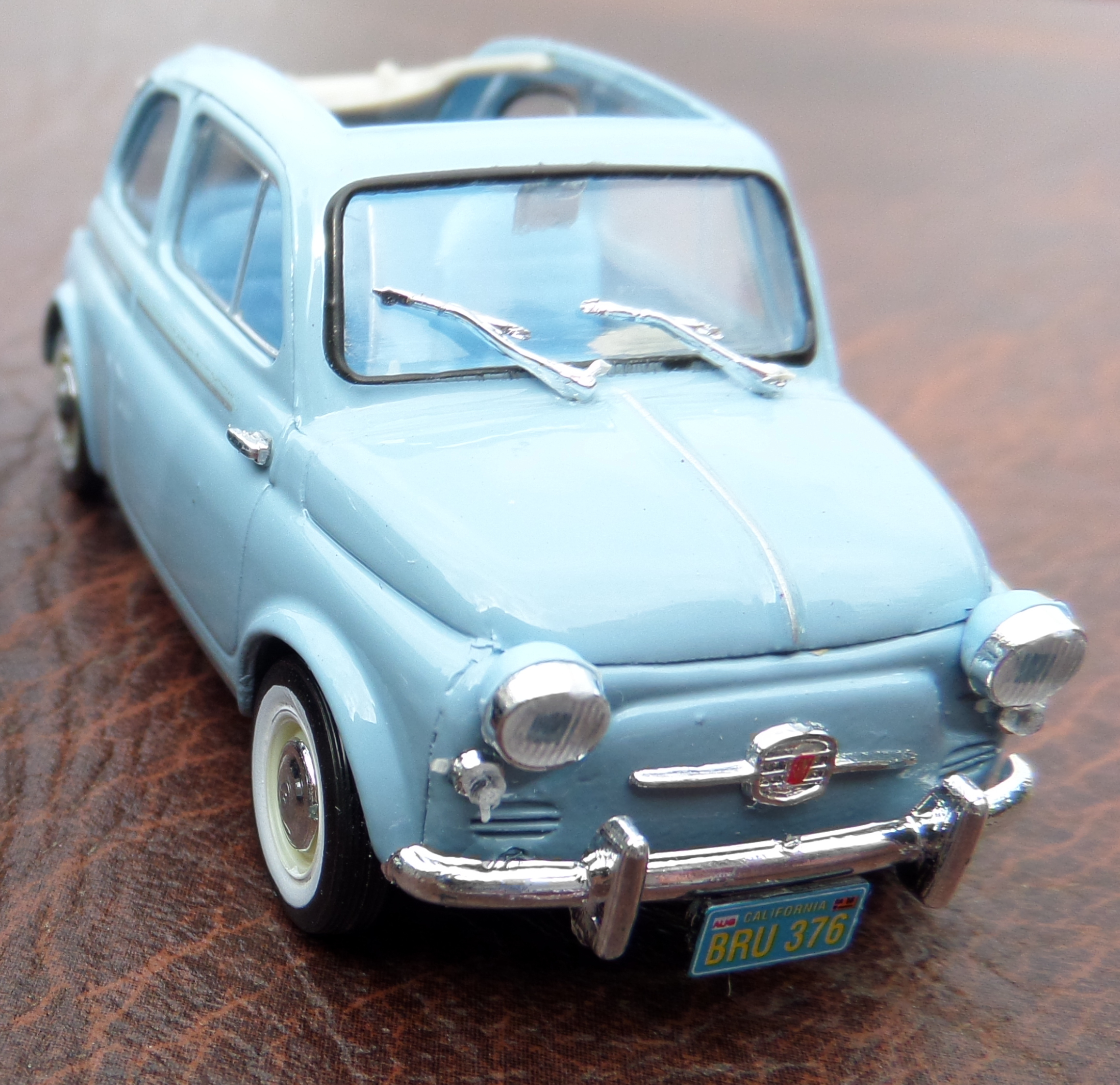
Brumm Models Fiat 500 America with cloth top. Note the intricacy of the details, but also untrimmed plastic parts and poor diecast lines.

The Carriage and Old Fire series were produced in detailed plastic very similar to Minialuxe of France or some Cursor Models of Germany. The Revival series of more modern automobiles, however, were produced in zamac – the first of the series being the cute and classic Morgan Sport 3-wheeler with the V-Twin engine hanging off of the front, which no one had ever produced before in miniature.

Another unique model choice was Henry Ford's 1902 model 999 land speed record car. This model caused a legal row with Rio, who had produced their own version of the 999. Thus the two sides of the Tattarletti family fought over whose model was first and more authentic. Sinclair reports that Rio won that battle, thus Brumm perhaps has made fewer of the 999 than Rio.

Brumm Models were advertised as "not toys and unsuitable for children" – a fact emphasized on the packaging which recommends that models are only suitable for ages 14 and up. Most Brumm models, similar to RIO and Dugu, were offered in top up or top down versions and these versions were offered in distinct colors. Unlike RIO, however, Brumm models rarely had opening features which made RIO seem the better value for the price. RIO chassis were better detailed and also, at times, Brumm paint applications could be rather thick.

== Attempting to best RIO ==
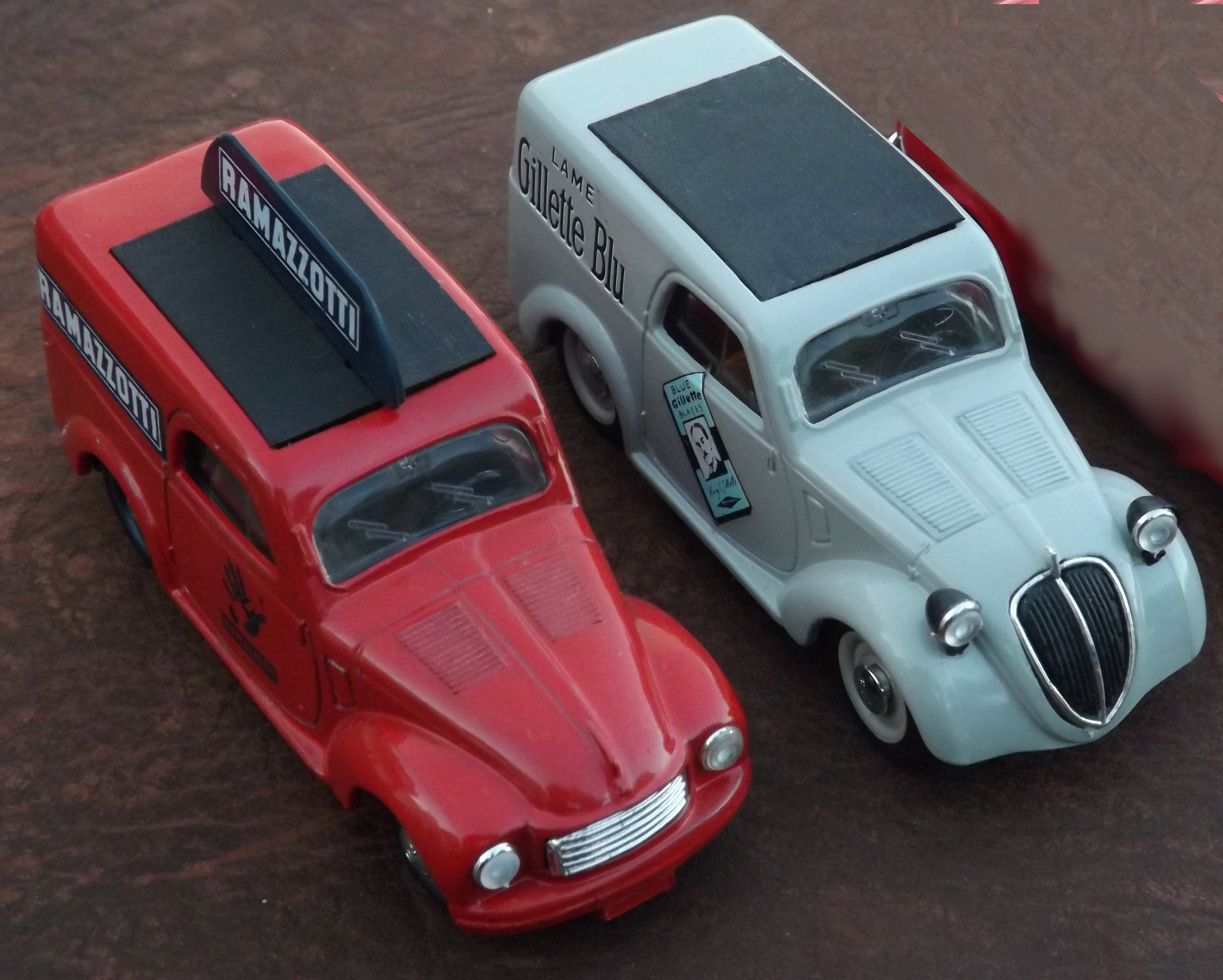
Brumm Fiat Topolino 500 vans. Left is the 500 B from 1946 and a 500 C from 1949. These selections show the company's aim at reproducing closely related models.

For RIO, diecast cars were once a sideline to a tool and die business. In comparison to RIO, however, Brumm produced a larger range of different models from the 1970s forward. It continues as one of the most prolific European collector oriented diecast firms today, though some of its offerings and approach are similar to Vitesse or Eligor which also offer interesting mixes of vintage with newer vehicles. According to a stock sheet from 2003 on the official website, throughout its existence the company had produced over a hundred models consisting of 353 different liveries. By comparison, RIO Models though fewer in number carried a more refined and pristine feel.

While RIO focused on classic as well as newer production cars, Brumm focused on period racing vehicles. Brumm's later models expanded to 1930s to 1950s race cars, accurately copying the real cars, down to varied numbering, striping, and nationalistic color schemes according to driver or to particular race. Early FIATs, Ferraris, and Alfa Romeos were common, but German and British cars also were in the line-up. For example, the 1938 Mercedes W125 Grand Prix no. 15 model accurately portrayed all kinds of intricate details including tiny rear-view mirror, low profile windscreen, suspension detail, authentic looking wire wheels, brown 'leather' hood strap, and disc brakes. This car raced in the United States and the model even portrays the Nazi flag on the rear of the body.

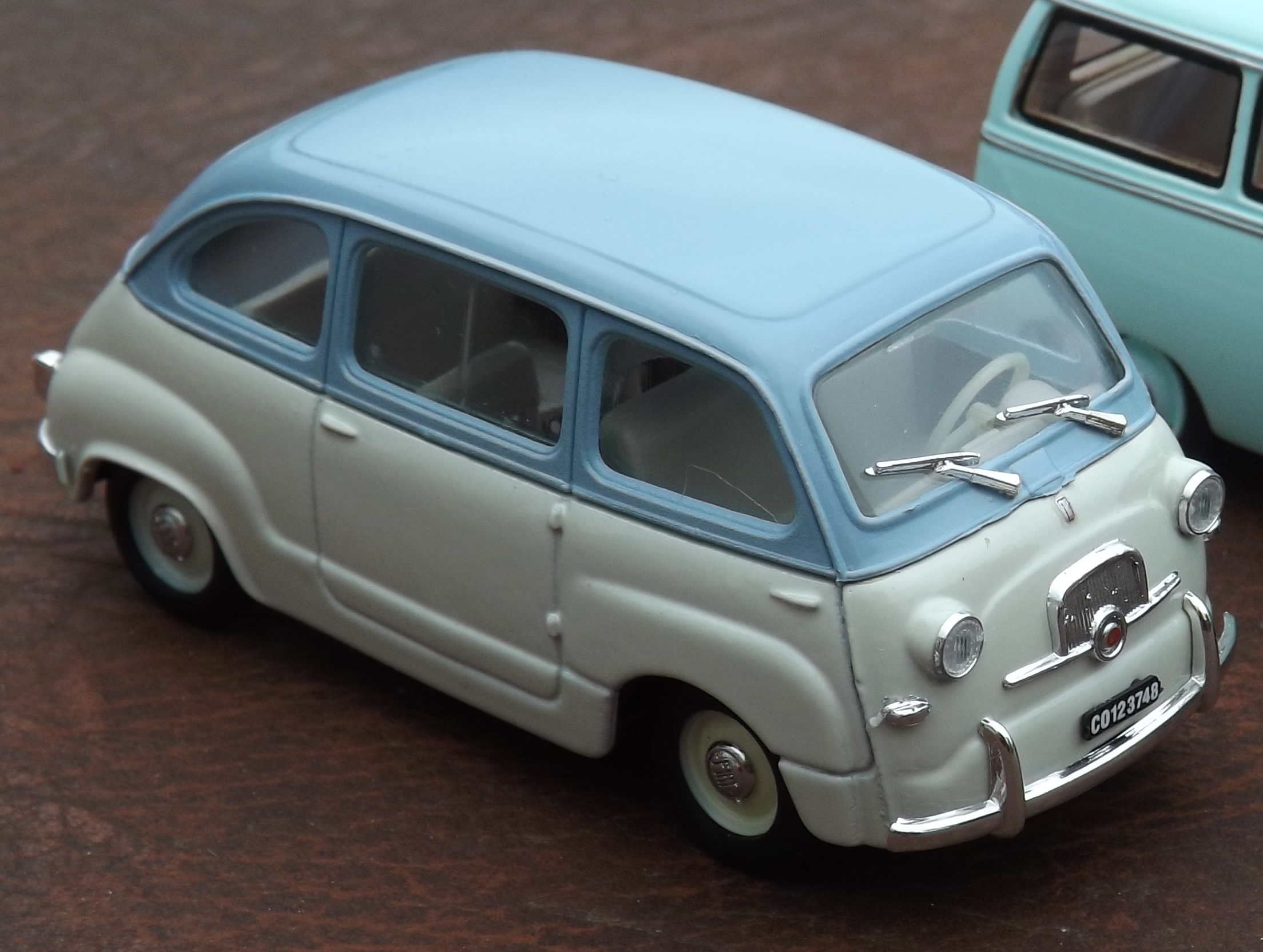
The Fiat 600 Multipla, very nicely rendered.

Later, racing Ferraris and Alfa Romeos from the 1970s and 1980s were offered. Examination of company catalogs easily shows that European diecast manufacturers favored the 'patria', so naturally, Italian brands were prevalent in the Brumm line, though British Jaguars, the Vanwall, and Mercedes-Benzes were also represented in miniature. Different liveries were offered for promotional purposes, like Jägermeister racing FIATs, AGIP, Campari rum, or Amaro liqueur vans, or an Olio FIAT 600 multipla. At least some of these offerings Brumm referred to as its "Serie Commerciale". Other nationalistic themes were seen in examples such as the Porsche Speedster with Eva Perón markings.

Starting in 1986, an annual series of limited production models was begun and in 1987 the beginning Revival line was discontinued (though still proudly shown in catalogs a decade later). Pride in the models produced was evident and the traditional Brumm carriage became the company logo for most packaging.

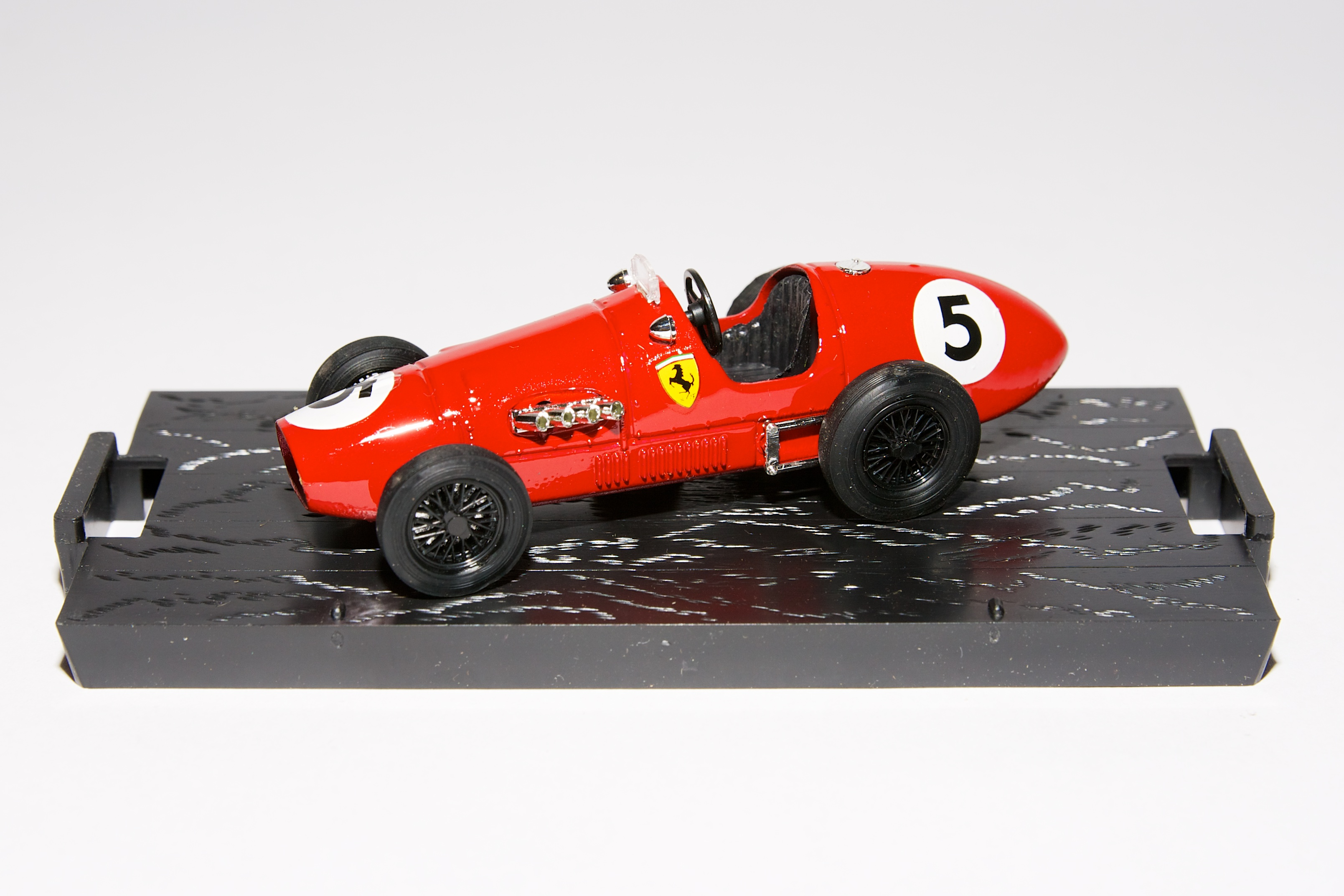
1950 Ferrari 500 F2. Brumm also did a number of race cars in several accurate designs to particular races.

Continuing the quote from the 1995 Brumm catalog, "Suddenly the indefinite profiles...were lit by blinding lightning and a freezing discharge of thunder awoke the city...a furtive shadow...comes out of the carriage and started narrating the history of automobile thought...a storm of miniature models...the Brumm Tempest." Again, the image is dramatically goofy, but the point is valid – especially in comparison with stepfather RIO, Brumm has been industrious indeed. Brumm even announces models sometimes years before they actually appear.

== Brumm today ==
Into the new millennium, Brumm continues with most of its traditional models while occasionally producing a new Ferrari, Lotus or Alfa Romeo, but since about 1990 fewer models have been produced – about one new model annually. A new sales angle appeared when semi-promotional models appeared, such as FIAT 500s with names of European political candidates on their sides (and yes, even one with 'Obama'). Also like RIO, models, often racing vehicles, are sold in lifelike dioramas.
