= RIO Models =

Diecast miniature cars made in Italy

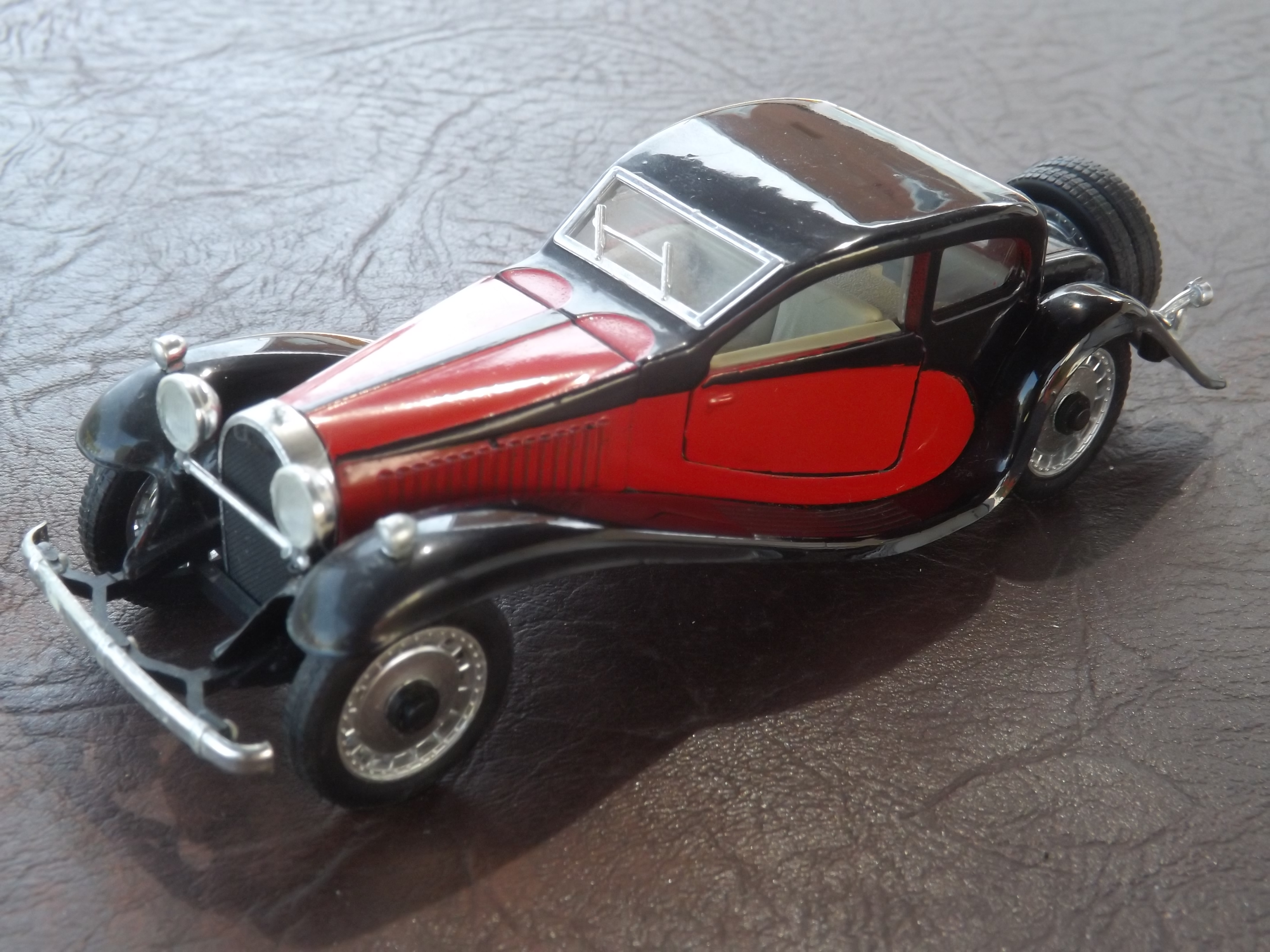
Rio 1933 Bugatti Type 50.

RIO Models was an Italian manufacturer of diecast and plastic 1:43 scale model cars, based in Cernobbio, Italy.

== History ==
All started in 1952 when three brothers, Reno, Nilo and Diego, founded the Fratelli Tattarletti (Tattarletti brothers) company. The small and young company, which in 1961 changed its name to ttttt Stampoplastica, limited itself to diecast works for other companies, e.g. Dell'Orto, Vespa, Rivarossi and Dugu. The three Tattarletti brothers started Rio Models as an independent company about 1961, or in 1962. Besides customary etymologies for the name 'Rio' (the Italian word for creek), the origin as a company name is unclear, although two of the three founders' names are also those of rivers, Reno and Nilo.

Later, in 1972, Nilo, one of the three founders, leave the company to found, along with a couple of business partners, Brumm another company producing diecast metal model cars and horse-drawn carriages. According to Sinclair it was a brother-in-law who started Brumm.

RIO models first appear to have been imported into the United States by David Sinclair, a model enthusiast who brought many previously unknown European model brands to the U.S. in the 1960s and 1970s. RIO Models, along with R.A.M.I., Safir, Brumm, Dugu Miniautotoys, Lledo, Minialuxe and Cursor Models took off on the original Matchbox 'Models of Yesteryear' theme producing replicas of veteran and classic cars that appealed to older collectors. Of these companies, only R.A.M.I. appears earlier than RIO Models. According to Edward Force, the first four RIO Models were made in 1961 – two 1906 Italas and two 1919 FIATs. These toys also may have been made under the earlier Stampoplastica name and manufactured for Dugu Miniautotoys. Soon however, the company was producing its own vehicles, and not contract works for other companies.

A few new models a year were sporadically produced until the company had a line of over 30 cars by 1972 and over 60 by 1978. Traditionally, models were supplied in 'top-up' and 'top-down' versions each being painted in just one color.

RIO models were always 1:43 scale and models were ultra detailed with between 45 and 75 individual parts. Models seem chosen for a combination of popularity, rarity, and unique design, traits consistently making Rio selections appealing. At first, most models were vehicles chosen from the European Brass era and from the 1920s. This favoritism toward earlier cars is seen in the standard RIO logo of two different automobile horns from the brass era; a fancy snake and more mundane trumpet.

Later, models of vehicles all the way up to the 1960s and 1970s were produced, such as the Citroen DS 19 and even a 1970s FIAT 124 Sedan. Still, there is a 'classic' sense to the RIO line – the unique cars of an earlier era. One also gets a sense that RIO was ahead of its time in offering models to collectors, and not children, long before such a practice became more common in the 1980s. In the mid-1970s, RIOs would cost between $15.00 and $20.00 when most other diecast 1:43 scale cars hovered in the $5.00 to $7.00 range.

== Not Toys ==
RIO models, however, can be very brittle and many seemed made from a zamac alloy that perhaps was heavier on the lead than the zinc – drop a RIO and it will smash into pieces – they were definitely not made for children (drop a diecast Corgi Toys car and it will just bounce off of the floor). Rio zamac was also prone to zinc rot and the metal often tended to crack and deteriorate.

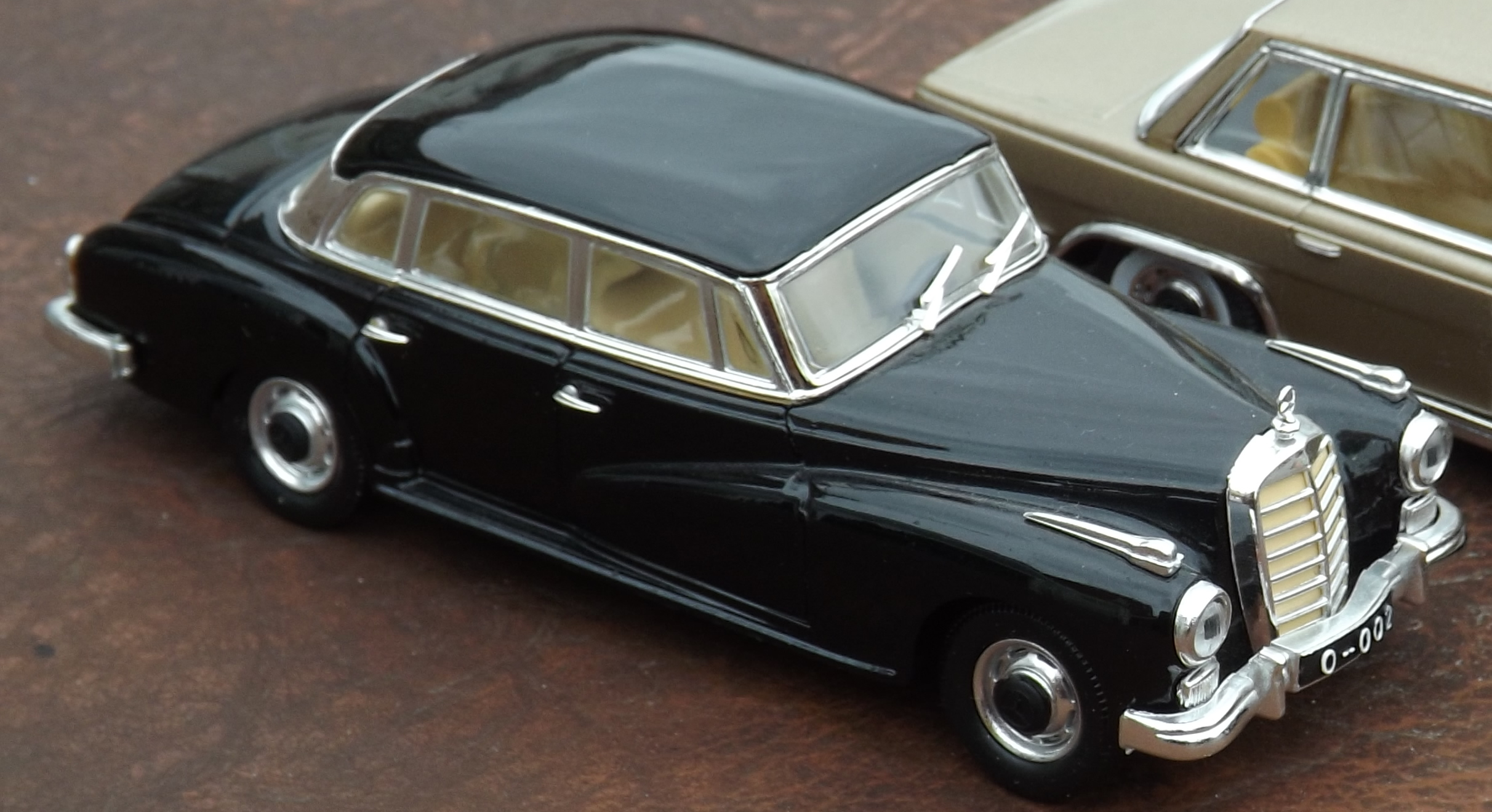
Rio Mercedes-Benz 300d "Adenauer". Like all Rios this model is 1:43 scale.

The mid-1970s also saw unstable supplies and many retailers stopped carrying RIOs when models were only delivered a few vehicles at a time. In 1977, David Sinclair, the main RIO importer to the United States, wrote that there were collectors who had been waiting on certain RIO models since 1964 and that he could have used 1,000 examples of each instead of the trickle he received.

== Focus on classic vehicles ==
A perusal of the online store 'Carmodel' shows that RIO makes more than 25 different models today. They seem more solid and the company more aligned to the mainstream model car business. Packaging is more in line with other collector / toy car manufacturers. Perhaps this is now RIO's main business – its other tool and die pursuits perhaps pushed aside.

One reason RIO modernized was due to competition with newer companies producing similar products. In the 1970s, German Cursor Models and Ziss and French Minialuxe, though often plastic, were similar to RIO in style and classic models selected. The kicker, though, was Brumm Models, which was a much closer competitor. Though likely unrelated to RIO, Eligor Models was another high production diecast company, started about 1980 in France, and focusing on cars from the 1930s to the 1960s.

== RIO today ==
Though RIO models had more parts and more detail, Brumm seems to have outdone RIO in many ways, producing more models that are sturdier and better marketed. Quality of Brumm Models was excellent, packaging well-executed even in the 1970s, and models were cheaper, which ostensibly pushed RIO to up standards and promotional know-how.

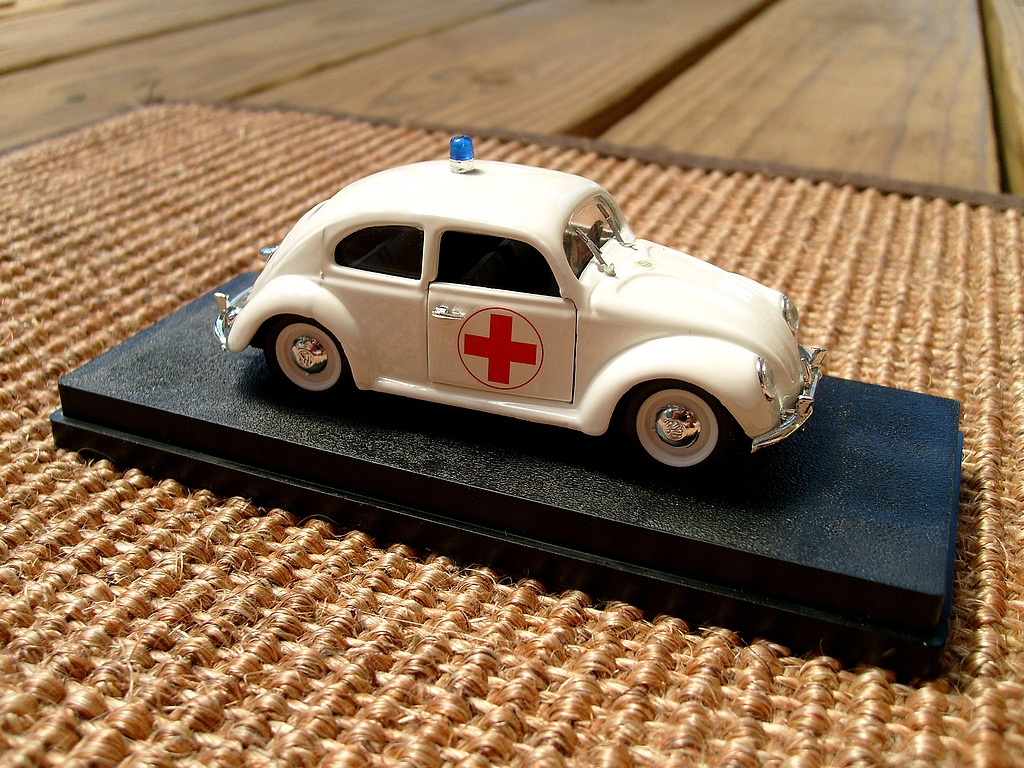
Rio Models Volkswagen Beetle Red Cross. The paint appears rather thick on this model.

Since this time, RIO has greatly improved presentation, often producing cars in unique dioramas and in unique historical situations. Commonly, RIO will insert into the box a small brochure giving specifications and historical information about the car (Vitesse Models of Portugal has a similar practice). Even today, there is a feeling of uniqueness and irresistibility to RIO's models that other classic car model producers have difficulty emulating. Models today usually cost $50.00 to $60.00.

In 2011 RIO Models was acquired by M4 models of Pesaro, Italy, makers of the Best Model and Art Model lines.

== Bibliography ==
- Sinclair, David (1979). "Scale 1:43, a Survey for Collectors". Automobile Quarterly. Vol. 17, no. 4. Princeton, NJ: Automobile Quarterly in association with the Princeton Institute for Historic Research. pp. 384–99.
- Force, Edward (1992). Classic Miniature Vehicles Made in Italy. West Chester PA: Schiffer. ISBN 0-88740-433-2.
- Rampini, Paolo (2003). Modelcars Made in Italy 1900-1990. Vimodrone, Italy: Giorgio Nada Editore. ISBN 88-7911-308-9.
- Sweetman, Chris (18 September 2010). "Dugu Bernardi 10". Hobby Talk.
