= Winross Models =

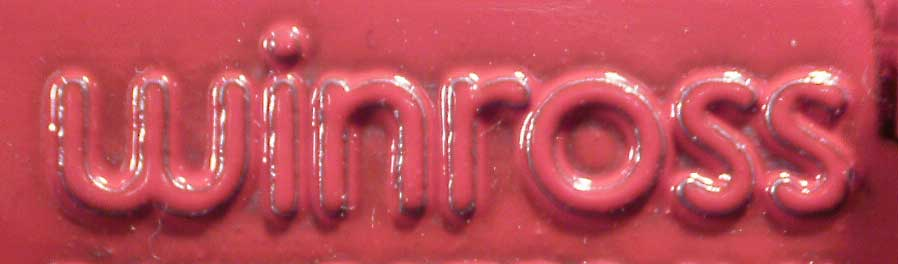

Winross is a diecast model truck producer based in Churchville, New York, just west of Rochester. The company was started in 1963 to make models of White brand trucks. Winross was the pioneer in 1/64 scale promotional model semi-tractor-trailer trucks. The trucks were known for their wide variety of logos and promotional ads on their sides. Over time trucks have become more sophisticated and the company has moved into silk screen printing for a variety of products.

== Early promoter ==
Even in 1970, Winross was known as a pioneer in diecast truck promotional models when such were more commonly manufactured in Europe. Winross trucks were not known for many features, just good diecast detail. Many later diecast producers, like Penjoy and Ertl were more similar or more popular, but Winross was first company in the United States, and maybe anywhere, to blaze the trail in diecast model trucks manufactured specifically for product promotion. Winross' recipe was (usually) semi trucks invariably in 1:64 scale (about 9 inches long), offered as promotionals to a variety of companies. Since the 1960s, Winross' "American Highway Series" celebrated a few basic truck cab makes with a variety of liveries - which were offered for retail sale. These liveries were what made Winross famous among toy and promotional collectors. Some of the first special liveries were created specifically for (David) Sinclair's Auto Miniatures in the early 1970s. Sinclair brought many European brands to the U.S. for the first time as well.

Winross then, was unique in several ways. It almost single-handedly established the promotional model market for model trucks of this scale made exclusively in the United States. Cecil Gibson, a collector in England, recognized the importance of Winross in the market as early as 1970. Also, Winross continued production of diecast metal models in the United States when most others had succumbed to lower labor costs in other countries. Ertl, Road Champs, Racing Champions, Matchbox, Hot Wheels and others followed in similar scales, thus copying Winross's lead, though these models were produced in China or Southeast Asia.

== Diecast details ==
Through the 1970s, cabs could be described as rather quaint; they were simple castings with no windows, interiors, or much decor. One of the simplest cabs was the curved roof White Trucks cab. In typical Winross style, it had no interior and few details. It is interesting that on the base of the model was cast, "a TOY from Winross, USA". This would have been out of character later as the models were seen as promotionals and collectibles more for adults.

Models were brittle and the metal broke easily. Only three or four different cab manufacturers were originally represented, most of these were White Trucks. Wheels were diecast as well and tires were rubber. Trailers were a diecast frame with flat soft metal (lead?) pieces inserted into the sides of the truck after different company liveries were applied. Dual rear trailer doors opened. Original trucks consisted of about 40 parts.

Perusal of the Winross website, however, shows that models have become gradually more sophisticated. Models circa 2010 have about 100 pieces earlier ones had about 60. Twelve different cabs are now available with more chrome and exterior lighting details. In one homage to Winross' past, cabs still do not have windows. Among Freightliner, International, Kenworth and Ford, though, there is still the Winross cab-over, a generic design that has been offered for thirty years.

== Offerings ==
Many different companies' names appeared silk-screened on the sides of Winross trucks through the 1970s; decals were never used. Examples were Ryder, McLean Trucking, Roadway, Coca-Cola, Caterpillar, Arkansas Best Freight, Quaker Oats, and Goodyear. Sometimes the individual factory or plant was identified on the truck as well.

David Sinclair was one of the first collectors and vendors in the United States to introduce many European brands of diecast cars and trucks. Sinclair was an ardent supporter and promoter of Winross. In 1973, Sinclair's Auto Miniatures of Erie, Pennsylvania, spiced up collectible offerings in the United States by commissioning new liveries in limited numbers of one-time offerings. Some of these were: Epstein Department Stores, Dannon Yogurt, Campbell 66 Express with their "Snortin' Norton" Camel who was "humpin to please", and Meadow Gold Milk, among others. So early on Winross established a good connection with collectors, and supported the Winross Collectors' Club of America.

By 2010, many new liveries had been produced to the specifications of many new clients. Examples are Allied Van Lines, Price Chopper, Kelly Tires, Sorrento, RPS, Ashland Oil, and Clover Farms Milk. Whereas one generic box trailer type was available in the 1970s, at least 16 different trailer and truck types are now manufactured by Winross, including package haulers, beverage haulers, dairy, oil, cryogenic, and propane tankers, a flatbed trailer, moving van trailer, drop pup, double pup, and triple pups, and a couple of straight frame non-articulated trucks. Occasionally, special models have been made, like the special late 1950s Sunoco trailer, or the Charles' Chips delivery van.

== Company direction ==
The official website reports that the company abandoned all retail sales to focus purely on corporate accounts in 1978, though the company is openly pleased by collector activities and formed a branch called 'Winross by Mail'. The Winross Collectors Club, formed in 1988, is still headquartered in Mount Joy, Pennsylvania.

Winross merged with AMA screening in 2005 and moves forward with promotional activities which now are not limited only to trucks but to print screening ads on a variety of products.
