= Daguan =

Daguan may refer to:

- Daguan County, in Zhaotong, Yunnan, China
- Daguan District, in Anqing, Anhui, China
- Daguan Park in Kunming, China.
- Daguan Yuan, a large garden in the classic novel Dream of the Red Chamber
- Daguan, an era name of the Chinese Song dynasty emperor, Huizong of Song
