= Ersan Dogu =

Turkish former professional footballer

Personal information
- Date of birth: 20 April 1972 (age 54)
- Place of birth: Bremen, West Germany
- Height: 1.80 m (5 ft 11 in)
- Position: Striker

Youth career
- FC Oberneuland

Senior career*
Years	Team	Apps	(Gls)
1995–1996	Werder Bremen	5	(0)
1996–1997	Galatasaray		
1997–1998	FC Oberneuland		
1998–1999	VfB Oldenburg	47	(11)
2000–2005	FC Oberneuland		
2005–2006	Bremer SV		
- * Club domestic league appearances and goals

Ersan Dogu (born 20 April 1972) is a Turkish former professional footballer who played as a striker.
