= Vitesse Models =

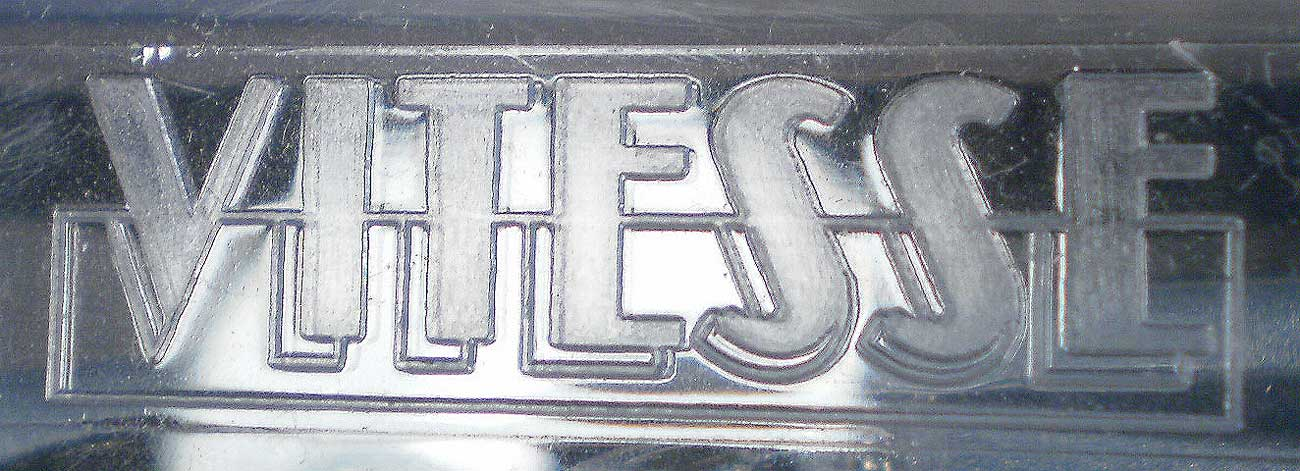

Vitesse is a Portuguese company that makes diecast model cars, primarily ones of 1:43 scale. It was founded in 1982 the city of Oporto and is a brand name of Cinerius, Ltd.

== The Fit of Vitesse ==
Because of the detail and realism of the models, Vitesse gained increasing popularity in the late 1980s and 1990s.

By about 1992, Vitesse had produced about 40 different models, often in top-up or top-down versions like Brumm or Rio Models. Offerings were made in plenty of liveries. For example, by 1990 the 1947 Chrysler Windsor model (a car also produced by Solido) had been produced in at least eight different versions: a plain sedan, New York City police, San Francisco Fire Brigade, Istanbul Taxi, official French government car, a French voisin 'pompiers', a Hot Springs National Park hotel taxi, and a Zippo lighters version with the middle of the car looking like two zippo lighters standing up.

Vitesse referred to its rather fragile offerings as 'toys'. The cover of the 1990 full-color catalog showed a 1957 Buick as a planter, Citroen 2 CVs with live rabbits, a VW bug cabriolet nearly being 'driven' by a golf club, and a 1953 Cadillac between two buns.

== Portuguese diecast ==
In 1990, the oldest Vitesse model was a 1934 white truck and the newest was a contemporary Peugeot 205, but most models were from the 1950s. Of course, Portugal had no vehicles of its own to offer to stoke nationalism, so models were fairly evenly selected from Britain, Germany, France, Italy and the United States. Inside the front cover of one catalog, an introduction to Vitesse was given in nine different languages.

Vitesse also produces models for other companies, but most are produced under the Vitesse name.

== Variety and detail ==
Rixon reports on Vitesse's 1960 Aston Martin DB4 commenting on the model's "simulated wooden steering wheel", "banks of dashboard clocks", and "metal mesh radiator" and "astonishing photo etched wire spoke wheels".

When the Sachsenring "Trabi" (Trabant) became the symbol of the fall of the Berlin Wall in 1989, Vitesse quickly jumped at the chance to produce it in miniature and sell it across a unified Germany and an emotional Europe. A unique American issue was the 'Carrera Panamericana' version of its 1953 Cadillac Type 62, whose two-tone color treatment included detailed race decals. Fans argued that with Vitesse, there was rarely the feeling of 'just another Lamborghini Diablo', though it did offer its own Porsche 911 and Ferrari 308 GTB.

Another offering was the 1956 Ford Fairlane police car. Only 5,000 of these cars were made, so chances of finding one with all lights and parts intact may be a challenge.

== Promotions ==
Vitesse also was quick to offer models in promotional guises, particularly related to racing sponsors. A specially packaged Coca-Cola Porsche 917, a Martini Lancia, special Peugeot promotional models and others made for Rothmans or Kenwood.

One popular promotional model often seen in the U.S. was the 3.5-inch 1/64 scale UPS truck. Sometimes seen mounted on special bases, the truck is detailed with official UPS brown colors and logo.
