= Cursor Models =

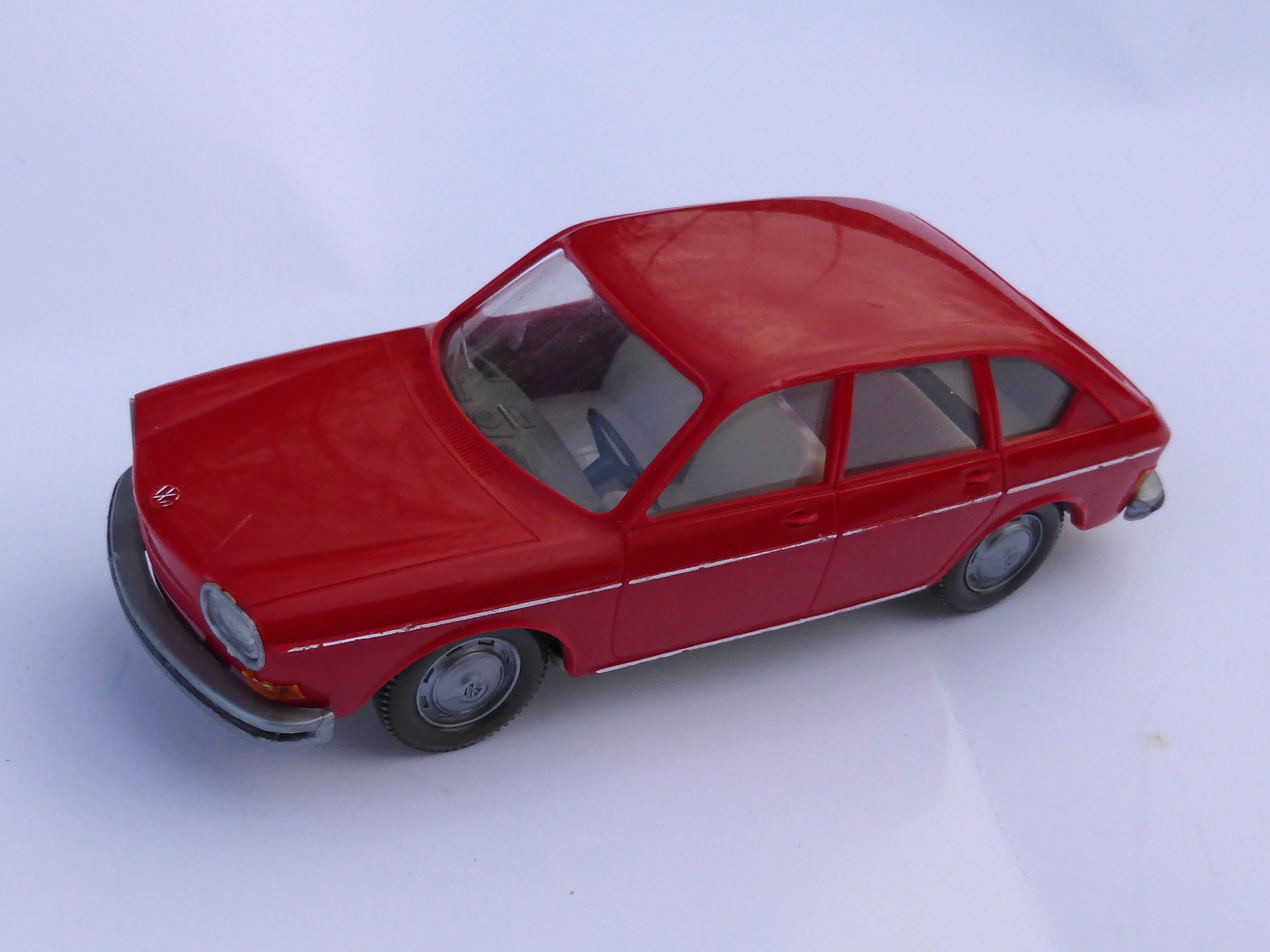
Cursor Volkswagen 411 sedan. Cursor was known for its VW promotional models in the 1970s.

Cursor Modell was a German company making models of antique and modern German vehicles. It is best known for its plastic replicas of vehicles mainly of the era 1880 to about 1920, produced for, and sold in, the Daimler-Benz museum in Stuttgart.

== Museum models ==
Cursor started making ultra detailed 1:40 scale plastic replicas of 1880–1920 era Mercedes-Benzes and Daimlers about 1969. The first models were produced by model maker Wiking and then immediately taken over by Cursor. Models produced (sometimes marked with the initials C.R.) were mostly of vehicles on exhibit at the Mercedes-Benz museum, like the 1886 "Dreirad" three-wheeler and Daimler's gas powered horse-buggy style "Motorwagen" of the same year. These were the first gas powered vehicles ever produced. Also made were an 1895 Erster Benz omnibus and an 1896 firewagon, and a 1904 MAN Bussing omnibus. David Sinclair, an influential dealer to the diecast collecting hobby, imported some of the first Cursor Models to the United States in the mid-1970s; previous to this they were unknown in the United States.

Cursor also featured several racing models for the museum as well, including the 1903 Mercedes Rennwagen, 1911 Blitzen Benz race car and the Mercedes SSK Kompressor driven by Christian Werner, the winner of the 1924 Targa Florio race in Italy.

Some collectors are critical of plastic for collector's automobiles, but those in-the-know realize that companies like Cursor, Minialuxe of France and Brumm and RIO Models of Italy, all have done their earlier "bicycle" tire vehicles in plastic because the spidery detail necessary for realistic portrayal of wire wheels and roof ties is not possible with diecast zamac.

== Case example ==
A good vehicle for analysis is the 1923 Benz Diesel Lastkraftwagen 5K3. The truck was notable for being Mercedes Benz's first diesel. The model is five and a half inches long, and made of a sturdy, rather heavy styrene type plastic that seems heavier than the styrene plastic used by American companies AMT or Jo-Han, the American promotional model and kit makers. It is also much more solid than most French Minialuxe models or early Brumm carriages and steam vehicles which seemed much more 'spidery' and delicate in the use of their plastic.

This model is very tasteful and authentic in appearance and is molded in three different colors; green cab, brown lipped flat-bed, dark gray fenders and rail frame base. The fenders and frame are diecast metal which lends more weight to the model. It has a realistic gold radiator with black grille and headlights. The headlights are 'lit' with an authentic looking chrome for lenses and higher up, beside the cab on the driver's side, is another light – painted yellow.

Despite the plastic make-up of many pieces, axles and spoke wheels are also metal, with realistic rubber tires. On the base of the model is molded "Made in Germany", while "Made in W. Germany" is printed on the perforated box base. It is likely the model was made around 1980, perhaps earlier.

The package is a cut and folded shiny card stock base with perforations for the tires of the truck. Covering this is a softer clear plastic cover. Printing on the bottom of the package gives specifications of the real 4 cylinder in German, English, French, and Spanish.

== Plastic promotionals ==
Some of the company's first promotional vehicles appeared about the same time as the museum pieces, and though they were not brass era, they were yet molded in plastic. One model was the Audi 100 sedan, the real car being one of the first Audis to be exported to the United States around 1969. This model was slightly larger than 1:43 scale, in a silver box with black lettering. The car was well detailed in styrene plastic, especially the front grille and also the floorpan and engine features on the plastic chassis. This model may have been one of the first promotionals offered by Cursor, and perhaps somewhat rare, because it is not mentioned in Force's book.

At this same time, around 1970, Cursor made other VW models in a similar style as the Audi. These were also made in plastic. One was the oval-eyed 411 sedan in light blue and also red (#868). It came in a promo looking white box with the car neatly shadowed in black on the sides. How much Wiking was involved in these models is uncertain, but it appears Wiking only produced a few of the older cars for the museum at the earlier time.

== Diecast promotionals ==
Cursor Modell Mercedes-Benz Unimog truck. This model is diecast zamac where earlier models were plastic. Note also the box design is exactly the same as boxes for Mercedes-Benz promotional products made by other model firms, like NZG.

About 1978, Cursor went in a different direction. First, models of contemporary trucks, mostly Mercedes-Benzes, started to appear. Secondly, these were now often diecast in zamac. Then, similar to NZG Models and Conrad Models three or four Mercedes-Benz sedans (the 230, 200, and 190) and the Gelandewagen SUV were introduced in 1:35 scale. This marked Cursor's main focus on the production of miniatures mainly for promotional purposes. Apparently all three companies were taking similar marching orders from Mercedes-Benz on how the company wanted its promotional models standardized. A BMW 3 series coupe also was made by Cursor in the 1:35 scale. As was typical models usually had opening doors with tilting seats and realistic rubber tires.

Some truck models were accompanied by tractors, bulldozers, Unimogs, at least four buses, a frontloader, a backhoe and some antique trucks and tractors – one was a 1903 Bussing flatbed truck.

It is interesting that packaging for many of the promotional offerings was identical to that of other diecast manufacturers. For example, the Mercedes Unimog (shown here) had an identical silver black-lined box design to that of the NZG Mercedes Coupe. The only difference is the precise box size and the color of the lettering stating what vehicle came inside. This is evidence of the control of the client over many promotional companies and their offerings. Obviously, Mercedes wanted a particular appearance for its packaged products and required that across multiple providers.

== Construction and agriculture ==
Cursor also produced construction and farm vehicles. One brand reproduced was Kramer tractors, one made in plastic, and also a Kramer backhoe/shovel. A Fendt Favorit tractor was also made. The trucks and heavy construction equipment were very similar to NZG and Conrad, though Cursor never matched their dizzying productivity. In fact, after producing about 40 different models over 18 years, Cursor seems to have produced nothing more after about 1987.
