= Minialuxe =

French scale model manufacturer

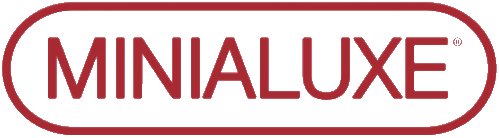
- Type: LLC
- Founded: c. 1959 (original company); 2012; 14 years ago (revived)
- Defunct: 1978 (original company)
- Headquarters: Oyonnax (original); Canéjan (revived), France
- Products: Plastic scale model cars, trucks
- Website: minialuxe.fr

Minialuxe is a French manufacturing company that produces and commercialises plastic scale model cars and trucks. The original Établissements Minialuxe was based in Oyonnax, producing models usually made in 1:43 scale, but some larger 1:32 scale vehicles were also manufactured, for example, a Peugeot 403.

After its closure in 1978, in 2012 Minialuxe was revived as a limited liability company, producing its model cars and commercial vehicles.

== History ==
Minialuxe started production of plastic cars about 1954 (some sources say 1959) and ceased production in the late 1970s. The company was based in the town of Oyonnax in eastern France about 20 miles from Geneva, Switzerland, and about 50 miles northeast of Lyon (where toy makers Norev and Majorette were headquartered). Oyonnax was known for its plastics industry, with experiments in celluloid long before WWII and a new burgeoning industry post-War. One landmark event that saw the area's explosion as a toy center was the local plastics industry's first trade fair which was located in Oyonnax in 1953.

Minialuxe claimed to be the first to produce models in a new plastic called Rhodalite, but apparently Norev beat them by about a year. Models featured were mostly, but not exclusively, French makes. There were two main series, a contemporary line and a classic line. Minialuxe appears to have started with the contemporary line, expanding into the classic line around 1970. Collectors traditionally seem to be more interested in the unique selections of the classic series, but all models, though somewhat simpler than the zamac metal diecast of other companies, were clever and included details that were quite endearing.

In 2010, Marc Faujanet, owner of Passion 43ème (a specialized magazine dedicated to scale 1:43 model cars) began negotiations with the daughter of Edouard Blanc after he had expressed his intentions to re-launch the Minialuxe brand. On 12 March 2012, a license agreement for a duration of 20 years was signed so Faujanet established a company with the same name to produce its model cars and trucks. The factory is located in Canéjan.

== The Contemporary Line ==
The contemporary line was started in 1954 with a few selections and it continued through the mid-1970s. It featured mainly French brands. Renaults seen were the Dauphine, Floride, 10, 16, Alpine A310, 5, 17, and an Estafette delivery van. Peugeots produced were the 203, 204, 403, 404, 504, and 604; Citroëns (11CV Traction Avant, Ami sedan and break, Dyane, Méhari, DS 19 and 21, SM, CX, and GS), Simcas (Aronde, Versailles, Marly Ambulance, Beaulieu, 1000, 1100, 1300, Océane, and Aronde Plein Ciel). For plastic, the selection and detail were impressive. Less well known French brands from the 1950s through the 1970s such as the Hotchkiss Grégoire, Panhards, and Matras were available and distinct from Norev – their main competition. Several models were offered in police livery, especially the Citroen 11CV fourgon (delivery van) which was available for several years in a variety of liveries. As time passed, model details and proportions became increasingly more accurate. For example, the Jaguar XK-E was simply stunning and could compare well to any Corgi or Tekno version. The Hotchkiss (and other cars) were available with various trailers or features such as luggage, skis, or a canoe affixed to the roof. The Peugeot 604 came with four plastic bicycles, advertising the "Grand Prix de la Montagne" in Tour de France style. This was a major difference between Norev and Minialuxe; though Norevs were better detailed, Minialuxe had cars and train accessories without the trains! Available were stop lights, street lights, fire hydrants, gas pumps, signs, policemen directing traffic, garage lifts and other pieces.

Other non-French makes were a significant part of the line-up. A couple of Volvos, Porsche 911 Targa, Mercedes W196 Grand Prix car, Jaguar E-Type and D-type, a Ford GT Mark IV, a Fiat 124 and a Siata-Fiat were included. European Fords (Consul, Anglia and Taunus), a VW K70, a BMW 1500, and a Vespa 2CV rounded out the offerings. Formula 1 race cars such as a Matra MS80, Ferrari 312B, and a Gordini added extra sport to the line. Minialuxe also made a few motorcycles, a Paris bus, and a couple of trucks.

Multiple car gift sets were offered, for example, six Citroën Tractions Avant in six different colors in one box, or a BP station with pumps and repair jack. Many of these more contemporary Minialuxe models were part of sweepstakes offers or used as promotionals for different companies, another main difference from Norev. While Norev perfected its own clever marketing ploys, Minialuxe went more for different company promotions. For example, "Chèque Tintin" was a sweepstakes offer based on the comic strip The Adventures of Tintin (Les Aventures de Tintin) where one accumulated coupons or stamps out of magazines and other publications and turned them in for model cars. Another example was a Citroen DS19 sedan with "Vêtements Bayard" (Bayard Clothing) imprinted (partially melted into the plastic) on the roof. Other cars advertised Bresilia coffee or Delespaul chocolate.

== The Classic Line ==
The classic Minialuxe "Les Tacots" line was started about 1970, after the contemporary line had been in production for almost a decade. The classic line featured 34 vehicles from about 1900 through the 1920s. French vehicles were the most common and included Renaults, Peugeots, Citroëns, Panhards and others like a Lorraine-Dietrich, a Balda, a Park Royal, and a De Dion. David Sinclair, who was probably the first to import Minaluxe models to the United States, noted that one interesting selection was a Panhard & Levassor that was one of the first automobiles and one of the earliest cars enclosed in glass. A few non-French American cars like variants of the Ford Model T, an early Packard landaulet, the first Oldsmobile Curved Dash model, and an Autocar taxi were offered. British models produced were an early Austin delivery van and a Lanchester.

Models were all plastic, but this was ideal for the intricate 'spiderweb' details needed for thin window supports and long narrow wheel spokes seen on early classic cars. The Minialuxe classic line was contemporary to and similar to early Brumm, Rio Models, Cursor, Dugu Miniautotoys or Safir which were all generally plastic. Some models, like the 1910 Renault came in different forms and sometimes had holes in the plastic where windshield or other pieces were placed on other variants – which gives the appearance that parts are missing when they are not. While most models appeared well-constructed, some appeared with glue sloppily streaked across body panels.

A small series of HO Tacot models were also introduced but Force says that only four were apparently made. One very intriguing Minialuxe model was a Hill's 1839 primitive locomotive, similar to George Stevenson's first locomotive built in Newcastle in 1829.

== Model Details ==
Minialuxe models had both bodies and chassis made of styrene plastic. Early Minialuxe models were fairly simple without windows, had simple chassis, and sometimes one piece tire/wheel assemblies. Early Norevs had better detail and proportion. Later models were more precisely detailed sometimes with two-tone paint schemes and some opening features. Windows were added in the late 1950s, but commonly bodies were molded in clear plastic, then painted except for the windows themselves. Some models suffered from acetate malformation. Usually the only metal parts were axles. Earlier cars had bumpers and chrome parts hand painted in silver while headlights and tail lights were often painted with yellows and reds. Another interesting detail when compared with Norev, was that Minialuxe offered vehicles in two main scales: 1:43 and 1:32, which provided for more detail.

By 1968 or 1969 interiors, steering wheels, opening hoods and engine detail had all been added on various models. Earlier engine detail was painted silver and later, chromed. For example, the Simca 1100 sedan had an opening hood and tail gate. Some models experienced glue distortion under roofs or warping of bodies over time, which is unusual for styrene. Early tires were solid white plastic with solid hubs or with different colored hubs (say beige or dark red) while later tires were a slightly softer polyurethane with simple metal hubs similar to Tekno or Corgi. Some plastic wheels were done in a wire style, sometimes in chrome, sometimes just in simple body color. By the 1970s, bodies were better formed with pieces fitting together much better.

Models were mostly unnumbered in the contemporary line, while the "Tacots" classic line was numbered. As a case study, on the black plastic base of the BMW 1500 sedan was written the name of the car and "1:43" then "Minialuxe" in large letters. Below that it said "Minia Stable" (steady minialuxe?) possibly referring to the workable suspension – and below then "suspension brevetee SGDG"(meaning 'patented'). The chassis was cut along lines parallel with the length of the car which subsections were supported around the axles giving a springy bounce to the car. Lastly, of course, was "Made in France".

== Packaging ==
Early Minialuxe vehicles came in simple cardboard cartons without plastic windows and illustrated with colorful standard artwork of the cars. 'Minialuxe' or 'Jouet Minialuxe' was written on the flaps commonly with the color of the car indicated. Colors were bright and saturated blues yellows, pinks and reds. No matter the model inside, Simcas and Peugeots were commonly shown on each early box, emphasizing French origins. The flaps said "Les Grandes Marques Francaises" ("The Great French Makes"). In the 1970s, similar to the early German Cursor company, models were offered in a clear flimsy plastic 'box' with a cardboard base.

== The Duration of Minialuxe ==
It appears that Minialuxe, as a rather sophisticated plastic model maker, lasted about 25 years, though it was not very well known outside France, and less well-known than its main competitor Norev. This is a longer period than several other European diecast model makers – whether in plastic or zamac metal. For example, Minialuxe lasted longer than Italian Mebetoys and nearly as long as Polistil, both of which had more company influence (Mattel in the case of Mebetoys) and more international success. Minialuxe models were very practical and realistic and never made any concessions to Mattel's fast axle wheel developments, flashy paint, and Hot Rod hip style which revolutionized the toy car industry.

It seems as the company declined, it depended more and more on its Tacots classic series and on adult collectors who prized them. Well-known collector Edward Force says, as far as he could tell, the last 'new' model was introduced in 1974, Like Norev and Politoys, Minialuxe also planned a transition to diecast metal, and produced one model in metal: a Berliet Stradair articulated tanker, but it was the only one. Some models like the VW K70 and Renault 30TS were produced in the 1970s, and the last appear to have been in the late 1970s. In any event, by 1980, Minialuxe was gone.
