= Batuhan =

Batu Khan
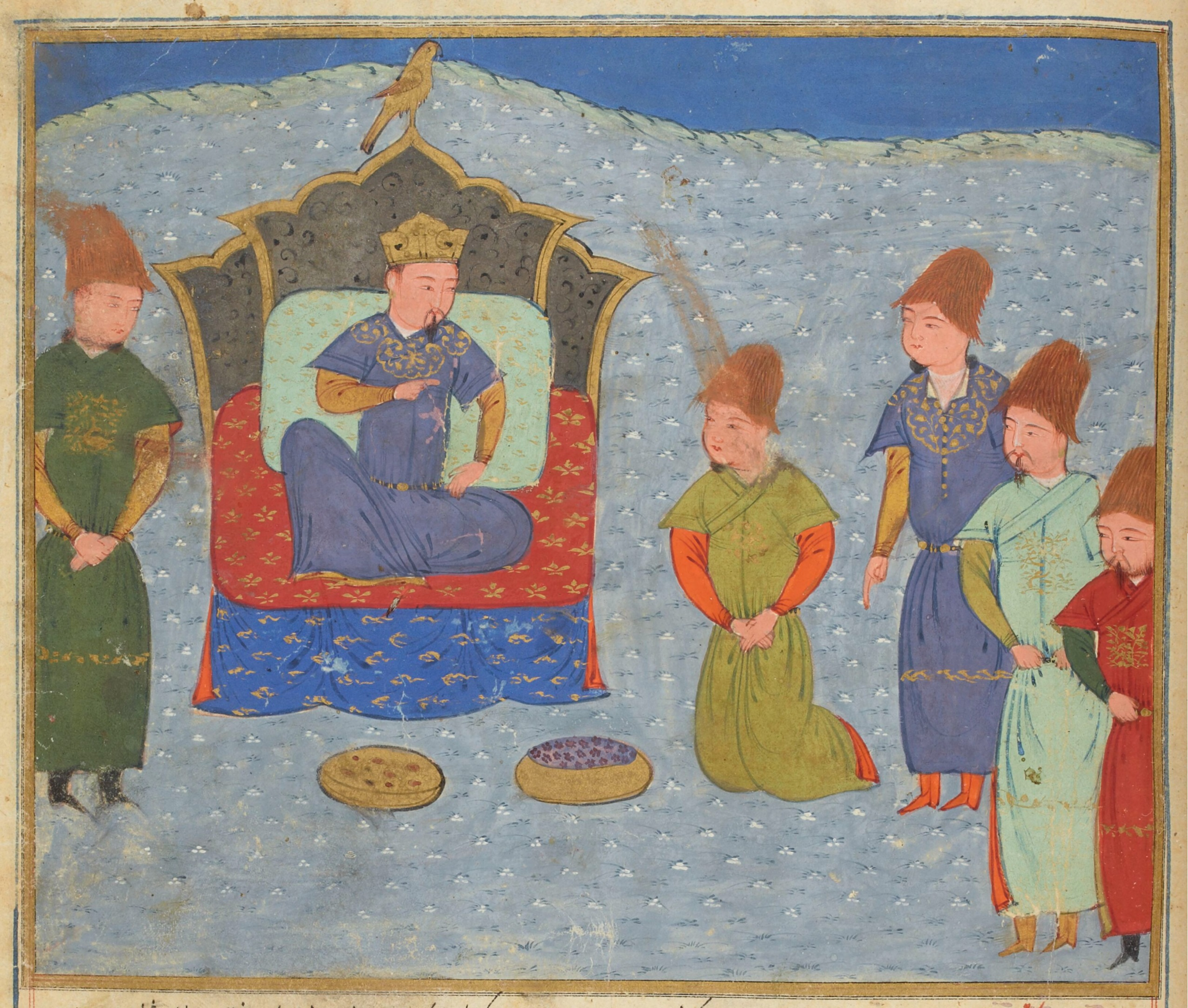
- Gender: Male
- Language: Mongolian

Origin
- Origin: Mongolian

Other names
- Nickname: Batu khan
- Related names: Bat

Batuhan is a masculine Turkish given name. The name is derived from the Mongol name Baatar, which means hero and Haan which is a Mongolian title for ruler. Notable people with the name include:

== Names ==
- Batuhan Akçaoğlu (born 2002), Turkish archer
- Batuhan Altıntaş (born 1996), Turkish footballer
- Batuhan Altıntaş (born 1996), Turkish sprinter
- Batuhan Artarslan (born 1994), Turkish footballer
- Batuhan Avcı (born 2000), Turkish volleyball player
- Batuhan Aydın (born 1991), Turkish musician
- Batuhan Çiftçi (born 1997), Turkish boxer
- Batuhan Daştan (born 1997), Turkish chess grandmaster
- Batuhan Gözgeç, also known as Batyr Akhmedov (born 1990), Russian boxer
- Batuhan Karacakaya (born 1997), Turkish TV actor
- Batuhan Karadeniz (born 1991), Turkish footballer
- Batuhan Kırdaroğlu (born 2000), Turkish footballer
- Batuhan Özgür (born 1998), Turkish cyclist
- Batuhan Şen (born 1999), Turkish footballer
- Batuhan Zidan Sertdemir (born 2005), Danish footballer
- Batuhan Ünsal (born 1997), Turkish footballer
- Batu Han Yüksel (born 1999), Turkish weightlifter
