= Simba (disambiguation) =

Simba is a fictional character who appears in Disney's The Lion King franchise.

Simba may also refer to:

== Arts and entertainment ==
=== Film ===
- Simba (1955 film), a British drama film
- Simba (2019 film), an Indian Tamil comedy film
- Simba: King of the Beasts, a 1928 documentary film
- Simmba, a 2018 Indian Hindi-language action comedy film

=== Music ===
- Simba (album), by O'Donel Levy, 1974
- S1mba, British rapper
- "Simba", song by Les Baxter

== Businesses and brands ==
- Simba (South African company), a South African snack food manufacturer
- Simba (soft drink), marketed by Coca-Cola during the 60s and 70s
- Simba Chips, a South African brand of potato chips
- Simba Dickie Group, a German toy manufacturer
- Simba Sleep, a British mattress company
- Simba Technologies, a Canadian software company
- Simba Telecom, a Singaporean telecommunications company

== People ==
=== Peoples and language ===
- Simba people, an indigenous people of Gabon
  - Simba language, a moribund language of Gabon
- Simba, a subgroup of the Guaraní people of Bolivia
  - Western Bolivian Guaraní, a language known locally as Simba

=== People with the name ===
- S1mba (born 1999), British rapper
- Amara Simba (born 1961), a French footballer
- Charles Mwando Simba (1935–2016), a Congolese politician
- Didier Ekanza Simba (born 1969), a Congolese footballer
- Jonathan Simba Bwanga (born 2000), a Congolese footballer
- Sophia Simba (born 1950), a Tanzanian politician
- Simba Hall, Mister Continental 2007
- Titus Simba (1941–unknown), a Tanzanian boxer
- Simba Makoni (born 1950), a Zimbabwean politician
- Simba Marumo (born 1978), a South African footballer
- Simba Nhivi (Simbarashe Nhivi Sithole, born 1991), a Zimbabwean footballer
- Simba Sithole (footballer, born 1989), a Zimbabwean footballer
- Germain Katanga (born 1978), known as Simba, a militia leader in DRC
- Dwayne Haskins (1997-2022), nicknamed Simba, an American football quarterback

== Places ==
- Simba, Burkina Faso
- Simba, Kenya
- Simba Ranch, a settlement in Kenya's Eastern Province
- Simba, Gauteng, a suburb of Johannesburg, South Africa

== Sports ==
- Simba FC, a Ugandan football club
- Simba F.C. (Rwanda), a football club from Rwanda
- Simba S.C., a Tanzanian football club
- Kenya national rugby union team, known as the Simbas

== Transportation ==
- Apco Simba, an Israeli paraglider
- GKN Simba, an armoured personnel carrier
- Issoire APM 40 Simba, a light aircraft
- Rosenbauer Simba, an airport fire truck
- UAZ Simba, a minivan concept

== Other uses ==
- Operation Simba, a conflict of the Dhofar Rebellion 1972–1975

== See also ==
- Simbad (disambiguation)
- Zimba (disambiguation)
- Cimba, a British-built clipper
- Simba rebellion in Congo-Léopoldville, 1964–1965
- simbarashe (disambiguation)
