= Ouma =

Ouma may refer to:

- Ouma language
- Ouma Rusks
- Eric Ouma (born 1996), Kenyan footballer
- Francis Ouma (born 1988), Kenyan footballer
- Kassim Ouma (born 1978), Ugandan boxer
- Mark Ouma (1960-2016), Ugandan journalist
- Mohamed Saïd Ouma
- Morris Ouma (born 1982), Kenyan cricketer
- Oscar Ouma Achieng, Ugandan athlete
- Oumah Wallace, Kenyan Statistician
