= Young Mbazo =

South african acappella group

- Also known as: Thee Legacy
- Origin: KwaZulu-Natal, South Africa
- Genres: Isicathamiya; jazz; afro-soul; hip hop; R&B
- Years active: 2009–present
- Label: Sony Music Entertainment Africa
- Spinoff of: Ladysmith Black Mambazo
- Members: Jabulani Mthembu (Leader,Founder); Khanyisani Mazibuko (Bass Singer); Philani Duma (Tennor Singer); Emille Ngcobo (Bass Singer); Simphiwe Sikhakhane (Altor Singer)

Thee Legacy is a distinct South African contemporary isicathamiya ensemble spinoff made up of the sons and grandsons of the multi Grammy-award winning acapella group Ladysmith Black Mambazo. They rose to stardom as a result of winning the inaugural Sing Off South Africa 2015 a cappella music competition, which aired on SABC 1 and earned them a recording deal with Sony Music Entertainment Africa.

Thee Legacy was nominated at the 16th Metro FM Music Awards in the Best Remix category for radio charting singles "Wena Wedwa" (MusicCraftMAN Mix) and "S’thandwa Sami" (Mr Kamera Remix); making them the only artists to receive more than one nomination in the same MMA16 category that year. Thee Legacy's Wena Wedwa (MusicCraftMAN Mix) is also featured as a soundtrack to the latest Simba Mapha TVC.

== Background ==
Thee Legacy Was Founded By Jabulani Mthembu In 2009 Alongside With His Brothers In Music: Khanyisani Mazibuko, Simphiwe Sikhakhane ,Philani Duma And Emille Ngcobo.. They From KwaZulu-Natal..At Inanda,Ntuzuma,And KwaMashu (The INK Area)

Before entering The Sing Off South Africa competition in 2015 the group consisted of more than five members. Due to the competition requirements they had to remove some members, as the competition required a maximum of five members. Jabulani Mthembu decided to eventually change the name because he didn’t want it to look like they were just following in their grandparents’ footsteps, that they would be under their shadow; and so Thee Legacy was born which developed into Young Mbazo after winning the inaugural Sing Off South Africa competition.

Having released the self-titled debut album Thee Legacy, the group released the single "Wena Wedwa", a follow up to their debut "Sthandwa Sami" single which made them the inaugural winners of The Sing Off South Africa 2015. In 2016 the group partnered with Victory “Vix” Chauke from MusicCraftsMan to create the remix of "Wena Wedwa" which has an R&B and afro house sound. The song led to the group's collaboration with the South African heritage brand, Simba, as they provided the soundtrack to the latest Simba Mapha TVC, as Simba celebrated its 60-year anniversary.

== Planet Zoo ==
Young Mbazo collaborated with artist J J Ipsen to help create the main menu theme, and other soundtracks for the 2019 videogame Planet Zoo (by English game studio Frontier Developments).

One member of the group said that "To me, the theme of the song, it reflects someone who is purpose-driven, or wants something and is eager to do it, no matter what happens, no matter the circumstances." in a video released by Frontier's official Planet Zoo channel.

Similar singing and chanting can be heard in the soundtrack to Planet Zoo 2, but it is not currently clear whether this was a re-use of the original vocals, by an entirely different group, or another recording by Young Mbazo.

== Achievements ==
- 2016: Received two Metro FM Music Award (MMA16) nominations both in the category for Best Remix for hit singles Wena Wedwa (MusicCraftMAN Mix) and S’thandwa Sami (Mr Kamera Remix); making them the only artists to receive more than one nomination in the same category at MMA16
- 2016: Their single Wena Wedwa (MusicCraftMAN Mix) was selected as the soundtrack to the latest Simba Mapha TVC
- 2016: Their single Wena Wedwa (MusicCraftMAN Mix) peaked at #8 on the RAMS Top 100 Chart
- 2016: Their single Wena Wedwa (MusicCraftMAN Mix) peaked at #1 on the Ukhozi Top 20 Chart
- 2016: Selected as the New Artist Spotlight by Apple Music
- 2016: Their music was selected for inclusion on the soundtrack to local film Wonder Boy produced by Kagiso Lediga
- 2016: Featured on the Afro Café Heritage Day special on SABC 2
- 2016: Released their debut self-titled album, Thee Legacy
- 2015: Signed to Sony Music Entertainment Africa
- 2015: Inaugural winners of The Sing Off South Africa

== Award nominations ==
- 2017: Metro FM Music Award (MMA16) Best Remix – Wena Wedwa (MusicCraftMAN Mix)
- 2017: Metro FM Music Award (MMA16) Best Remix – S’thandwa Sami (Mr Kamera Remix)

== Discography ==
Studio album

- Thee Legacy (2016)
