= Majorette (toy manufacturer) =

German model car brand

- Formerly: Rail-Route Jouets (1961–1966)
- Industry: Toys; Collecting
- Founded: 1961; 65 years ago
- Founder: Émile Véron
- Defunct: 2010; 16 years ago
- Fate: Acquired by Simba Dickie and became a brand of it
- Headquarters: Fürth, Germany
- Products: Die-cast scale model vehicles.
- Parent: Idéal Loisirs (1993-1996); Triumph-Adler (1996-2003); Smoby (2003-2008); MI29 (2008-2010); Simba Dickie Group (2010–present)
- Subsidiaries: Solido; Novacar
- Website: majorette.com

Majorette is a German model car brand owned by the Simba Dickie Group.

Majorette was originally a French company from 1961 to 2010. Their products are scale model vehicles, particularly Matchbox-like 3 inches long diecast models (scales between 1:55th and 1:76th). Newer models are made in Thailand.

== History ==
The company Rail-Route Jouets was founded in 1961 in Lyon, France by Émile Véron, of the family that also created Norev (the Véron family name spelled backwards). Initially, model railways and accessories were made. By 1964, the first cars came to market under the name "Majorette". The first model was a BRM Formula One car. In 1966, the name of the company was changed to Majorette.

Majorette soon became the largest French toy car manufacturer. The main competition was Matchbox of Hackney, London, but also German Siku and later, conceptually, Japanese Tomica. Though French cars like Peugeot and Renault were emphasized, other licensed marques included European brands, and North American vehicles from General Motors, Ford, and Chrysler. Japanese Nissan and Toyota are also represented.

Logo used from 2010 until 2025.

At the end of 1980, the revered diecast producer Solido was purchased. The Portuguese company Novacar was also purchased and Majorette production started in Portugal in the 1990s. Besides their important domestic presence, Majorette relies heavily on commercial sales to foreign markets. In 1982, Majorette USA was established in Miami, Florida, but that extension was relatively short-lived as Majorettes were not heavily retailed in the U.S. through the 1990s and 2000s.

Majorette went into bankruptcy in November 1992 and was acquired by Idéal Loisirs in April 1993, then Idéal Loisirs was acquired by Triumph-Adler in January 1996. The French factory of Rilleux-la-Pape closed in 2001.

Majorette was purchased by Smoby in June 2003. Smoby-Majorette went into bankruptcy in October 2007. In March 2008, through a tribunal at the commercial court of Lons-le-Saunier, Majorette was sold to the investment fund MI29 while Smoby was sold to Simba Dickie.

In November 2009, Majorette found itself insolvent again and in February 2010, through a tribunal at the commercial court of Paris, a sale was granted to Smoby Toys. Majorette today remain a part of the German Simba Dickie Group since 2010, and following this takeover, became a brand name used by Dickie, a subsidiary of this group.

== Series and packaging ==
=== Standard vehicles ===
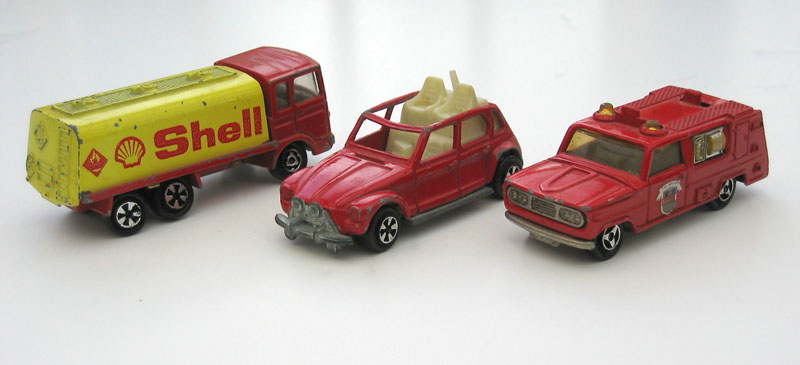
Three 200 series Majorette vehicles from 1975 (Saviem SM Europe Tanker, Citroën Dyane Maharadjah and Dodge Pompier).

Over the years, Majorette has adapted to increasing competition, with mixed results. The first line was the 100 series of roughly 3 inch long vehicles. Then the 200 series of the same size replaced it around 1970 and was very successful as Majorette moved into many world markets. 100 and 200 series cars and trucks were much like Matchbox, though the focus was on French brand vehicles. Some were cast in a rather bulky and thick style when compared with Matchbox, Siku, or Tomica.

The popular 300 series combinations of cars with trailers and boats as well as semi-articulated trucks dated from the mid-1970s. One clever example was the handsome Volkswagen beetle towing kayaks on a trailer, the Renault Michelin canvas topped tractor trailer in blue and yellow from the 1980s, or the Chevy pickup truck hauling a luxurious yacht. Buses like the traditional London double decker were also produced in the 300 series in the mid-1980s. These were promotionals advertising the new bus service, but although the labeling was true-to-life, the toy Majorettes decorated bore little resemblance to the real London buses.

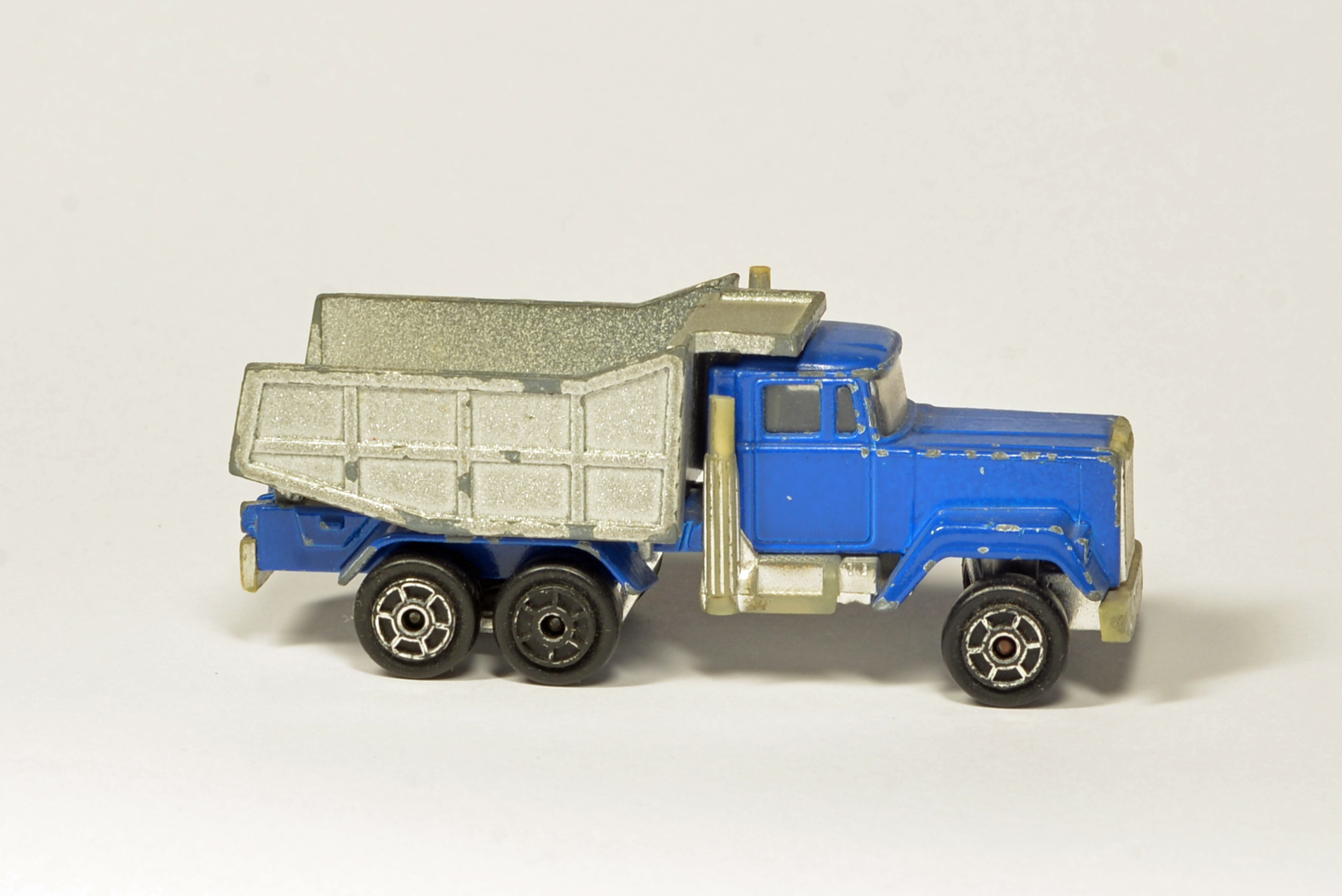
A dump truck.

Packaging for Majorette models has always had a red or orange motif. For example, 1970s 300 series cars and trucks sported a nostalgic looking somewhat art-deco-style blister card package with yellow at the bottom which changed upwards to orange, red and then purple. In the center of the package a downward pointing arrow design went rather spectrally from light green at the top to dark green and blue. Package backs featured fifteen illustrations (not photos) of other vehicles in the 300 series with their accompanying numbers. Each package was the same for each model, with little gold stickers on the plastic blisters labeling the number and type of vehicle (in French).

Into the eighties, 200 series blister packs were a simple, even austere, red and white with the Majorette logo in gold. For a time, there were no illustrations. Soon illustrations appeared, and the cards appeared with either red or blue backgrounds. About the same time, especially for the U.S. market, vehicles were often placed in clear plastic containers – not blister cards – colored in gold, white and red. Into the 1990s, vehicles normally appeared in bright red blister cards with more graphics and illustrations with a yellow band around the Majorette name.

Similar to Matchbox, Budgie or Siku, the standard series of cars was about 1:64, but the scale was mainly aligned to three inches. Other manufacturers, like Tri-ang's Spot On maintained precise scale across all vehicles, which often was a problem when considering uniform packaging techniques. Scale varied whether a Majorette vehicle was a small mini car like the cutely-done Renault Twingo or the Volvo Yoplait truck – all being anchored to the 2.5 to 3 inch size.

During the 1980s, many larger cars, trucks, farm and construction vehicles were introduced in the 4 to 6 inch size. These varied from the Lincoln limousine to farm tractors and trailers and cement mixers. All were packaged in the same eye-catching red packaging. Among these were the 600 series of semi-tractor trucks.

=== Sonic Flashers ===
One line of cars was known as the Sonic Flashers. These were standard sized Majorettes that, when pushed down on, produced a siren blare with flashing lights. These came in military, police, fire, and ambulance versions. These vehicles had durable electronics – with batteries sometimes lasting an entire decade before losing power. Today Majorette "Light and Sound" vehicles fill this gap – though they are larger, with pull-back windup motors.

=== Road Eaters ===
Another line based on the 200 series were "Road Eaters". Regular cars were offered with tampo printing of various food companies products pad printed on them, such as Willy Wonka "Gobstoppers", "Nerds", "Dweebs" and "Runtz" candy, "Swanson Kids Fun Feast" and "Swanson Kids Grilled Cheese Barnie Bear", "Campbell's Dinosaur Vegetable Soup", "Campbell's Teddy Bears", "Cry Baby" candy, "Pepsi" and "Diet Pepsi", "Cheetos Chester", "Peter Pan Creamy", and "Franco American Spaghetti Os". Other food products were also advertised and food coupons were offered with the vehicles. These cars were usually offered in two packs. Another popular line were the 'Circus' vehicles and Coca-Cola brand cars.

=== Majo-kit ===
Majorette was always oriented to play value with sets, tracks, and accessories. During the 1980s and 1990s Majorette made play sets called Majo-kits. They came with plastic pavement pieces that locked together to form the streets of a town. Pieces were straight, inner corner, outer corner and others that could be used as parking spaces. Each piece had at least one hole on it where objects such as traffic signs, street lights, parking meters, rubbish bins, flowers, telephone booths and even buildings could be inserted. Some sets would include one or more Majorette vehicles and others included figurines for added play value. The varied piece sizes were not to scale with one another.

=== Planes and Helicopters ===
Although mainly a die-cast car and truck producer, Majorette has had a plane and helicopter line to compete with Matchbox Skybusters. The Majorette airplane and helicopters line was expanded in 2013 to include such airlines as Air Mauritius and TUIFly, along with eleven others and five fictitious ones.

== Marketing to confront Matchbox ==
Though realism and detail were not always as good as Matchbox or Tomica, by the early 1970s Majorette established a reputation for making quality, heavy vehicles, incorporating features like opening doors and hoods, translucent plastic parts, and sprung suspension systems. For example, mid-1970s Majorettes were superior models to French Norev Minijet cars, as demonstrated by the Citroen CX models from both firms – the paint finish on the Majorette is more consistent, and less thickly applied compared to the Norev. Doors on Majorettes are sprung, as is the suspension. Number plates and detailed plastic parts set the older Majorettes apart. More plastic parts are now featured on the Norev cars and metal bases are common on their new castings, in contrast to Majorette which has now moved downmarket with plastic bases, and less expensive tampo printing for headlamps instead of clear plastic pieces. For comparison, Norev wheels are now detailed replicas of the real thing compared to Majorette's more generic offerings.

Into the 1980s, a marketing strategy emphasized the toy appeal of the cars, including brighter paints, large tampo printings and slightly exaggerated bodies. However, it was well executed, and even if the cars lost some realism, they had an attractive solidness and style compared to the competition.

== Diecast outsourcing: Brazil and Portugal ==
In the late 1970s to early 1980s, the Brazilian toy firms of Inbrima and Kiko manufactured Majorette models under license. By producing locally, Majorette benefited by avoiding duties on importing from France. Brazil had established the Free Economic Zone of Manaus (in Portuguese, Zona Franca de Manaus) to boost regional development in the state of Amazonas and these companies manufactured here.

Inbrima models had a "black label" attached to the base identifying the place of manufacture, while the majority of models had the later "FAB ZF MANAUS" white plastic tab affixed to the base, indicating that the models had been made in that city.

Around the same period, Mr. A. Kikoler and his toy brand name Kiko also reached an agreement with Majorette to produce approximately 15 Majorette models in Brazil, at a factory in Rio de Janeiro. Again, as with Inbrima, local color schemes and liveries unique to Brazil were used. Kiko models included the Datsun 240Z, the VW T2, Citroen Dyane, and the Renault 4. On the bases, ‘Kiko Majorette’ was cast over the original Majorette name, with ‘Made in Brazil’ written in Portuguese.

The 1990s brought financial troubles and Majorette began to retreat from the U.S. market. The period had a tremendous impact in the quality of the miniatures. In 1992, bankruptcy was followed by a takeover by Idéal Loisirs, and most Majorette production was relocated to Thailand, where a factory was built in the Nava Nakorn Industrial Promotion Zone, in Pathum Thani Province, comprising 1,000 square meters. As of 2012, the factory had grown to 13,000 square meters.

Though most Majorette models have since been made in Thailand, one exception was the Portuguese Novacar series acquired by Majorette. These were well-done models with plastic bodies and metal bases – for a time these cars were marketed as a new '100' series, but later regular Majorette models were also made in Portugal as blister packages were marked with red "P"s, "F"s, and "T"s for Portugal, France, or Thailand.

During this period, Majorette models gradually ceased to display the “Made in France” marking on their bases and packaging. The traditional silver metal base was progressively replaced by black plastic, a cost-reduction measure adopted by many toy manufacturers. This change also altered the characteristics, resulting in reduced weight and a less substantial feel.

The original Majorette brand survives. After Majorette's parent company Idéal Loisirs was purchased by the German entity Triumph-Adler, now entering the 21st century, batches of better castings have been introduced, as well as an image face lift that includes a modified logo, and a toning down of the bright aesthetics of the 1980s and 1990s. This was in touch with the automobile industry's trend of using plainer, metallic paints. Despite some occasional poor paint choices, and an intriguing fixation with the silver grey, the style change has been successful.

== Contemporary Majorette ==
Today, as part of the Simba Dickie Group, the Majorette 200 line continues to be made in Thailand. The distribution of Majorette via major retailers has been limited mainly to Europe, South America and Asia. Circa 2010, the Majorette lines offered today are standard "Singles" packaged in various ways, "Extractor" series (construction), "S.O.S." (ambulance and police format), "Trailers" – semi trucks and vehicles with trailers (basically the old 300 series), the "Farm" series of CLAAS tractors, "Motorcycles", "Rockerz" 4x4 Monster trucks, "Planes and Helicopters", the "Pinder" Circus series, liveried "Racing" vehicles and racing trucks with trailers. For 2012, nine new model castings have been announced.

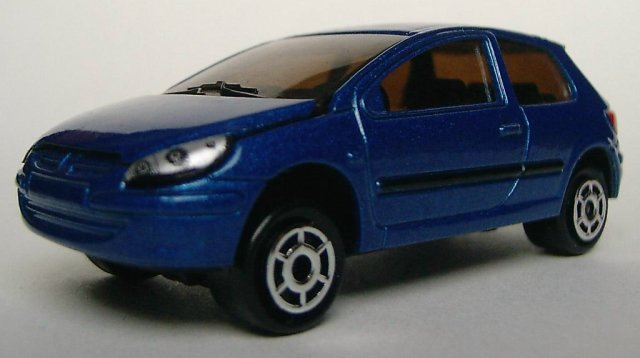
Peugeot 307 from the 2000s.

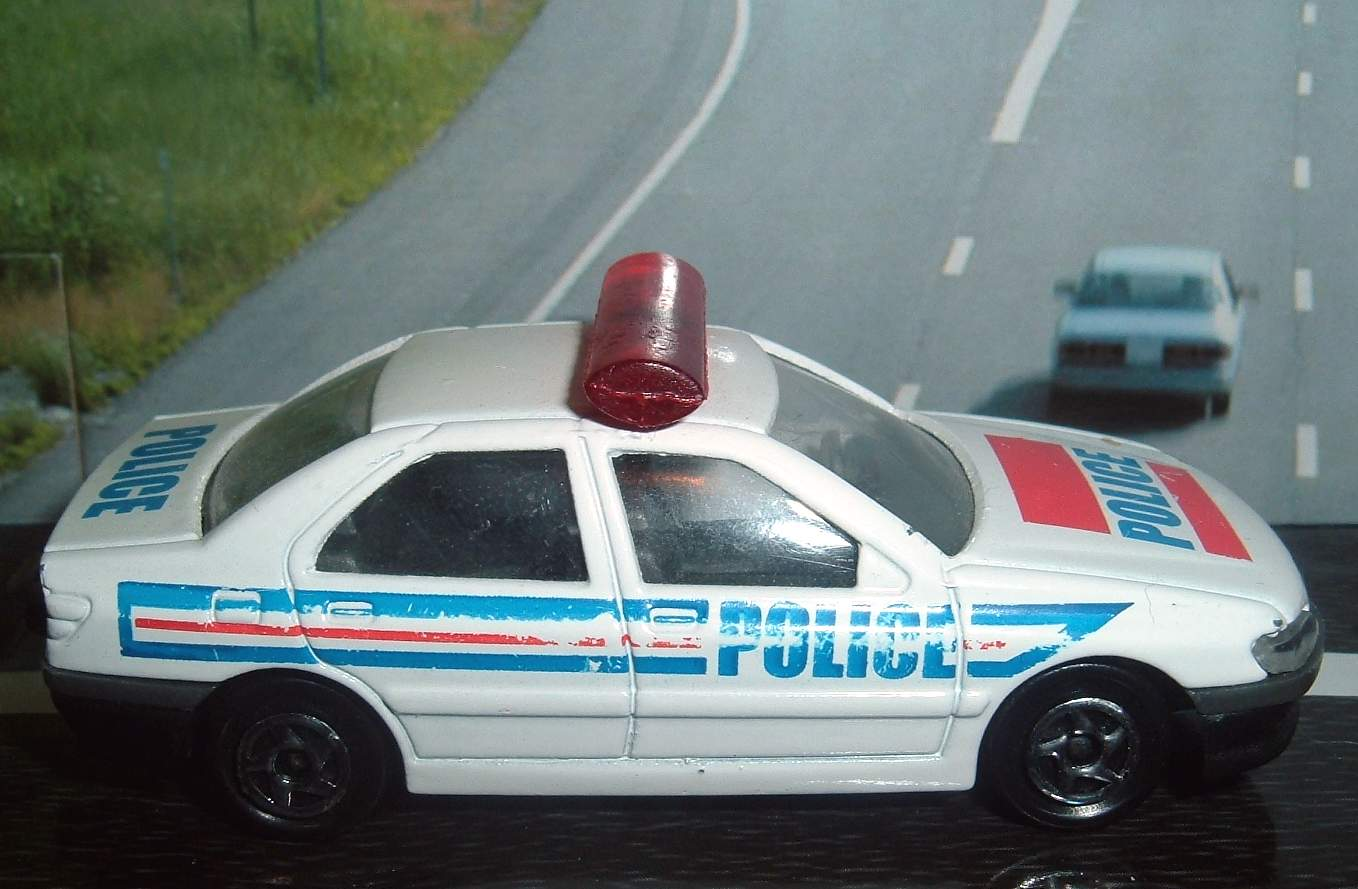
Peugeot 406 police car.

The "Majo-Teams" offer vehicles of different sizes in different themes, and is reminiscent of offerings during the 1990s. Some of the castings, such as the 1980 Chevrolet 4-door Impala, have been made continuously since the mid-1980s. Lastly, a new line of "Eco Tech" cars features electric, hybrid and other 'green' and environmentally friendly vehicles.

Some new models were released later than originally expected. For example, the Nissan Murano, Fiat Panda and Mercedes-Benz SLK were due to be released in 2005, but they did not reach the market until Autumn 2006. Only 3 models due to be released in 2005 actually made it onto the market that year, and were reported by collectors to be 'very hard to find'.

About 2010, similar to Matchbox or Hot Wheels, Majorette was moving into plastic cars and trucks of larger sizes. One example from this new "Kids Mate" series was a Mini Cooper in about 1:20 scale. The car is very detailed and complete with all opening features, but all in plastic in a package with bright (but Majorette-like) red colors. Also in this series is a line of plastic trucks; a trash truck, a logging truck, and a container truck. This line seems a more commercial "toy" ground whereas Solido (also a Simba Dickie company) has the 1:43 scale collectibles with Majorette offering the smaller 1:64 line as well.

The Majorette factory near Bangkok, Thailand, was almost completely destroyed by heavy floods in the fall of 2011. Zinc injection molding equipment, nearly all plastic injection machines, and all mechanical equipment needed to be replaced. Production at this facility was resumed by July 2012 with most of the 470 employees keeping their jobs. The total investment in this reconstruction was approximately €10 million.
