= Solido =

French scale models manufacturer

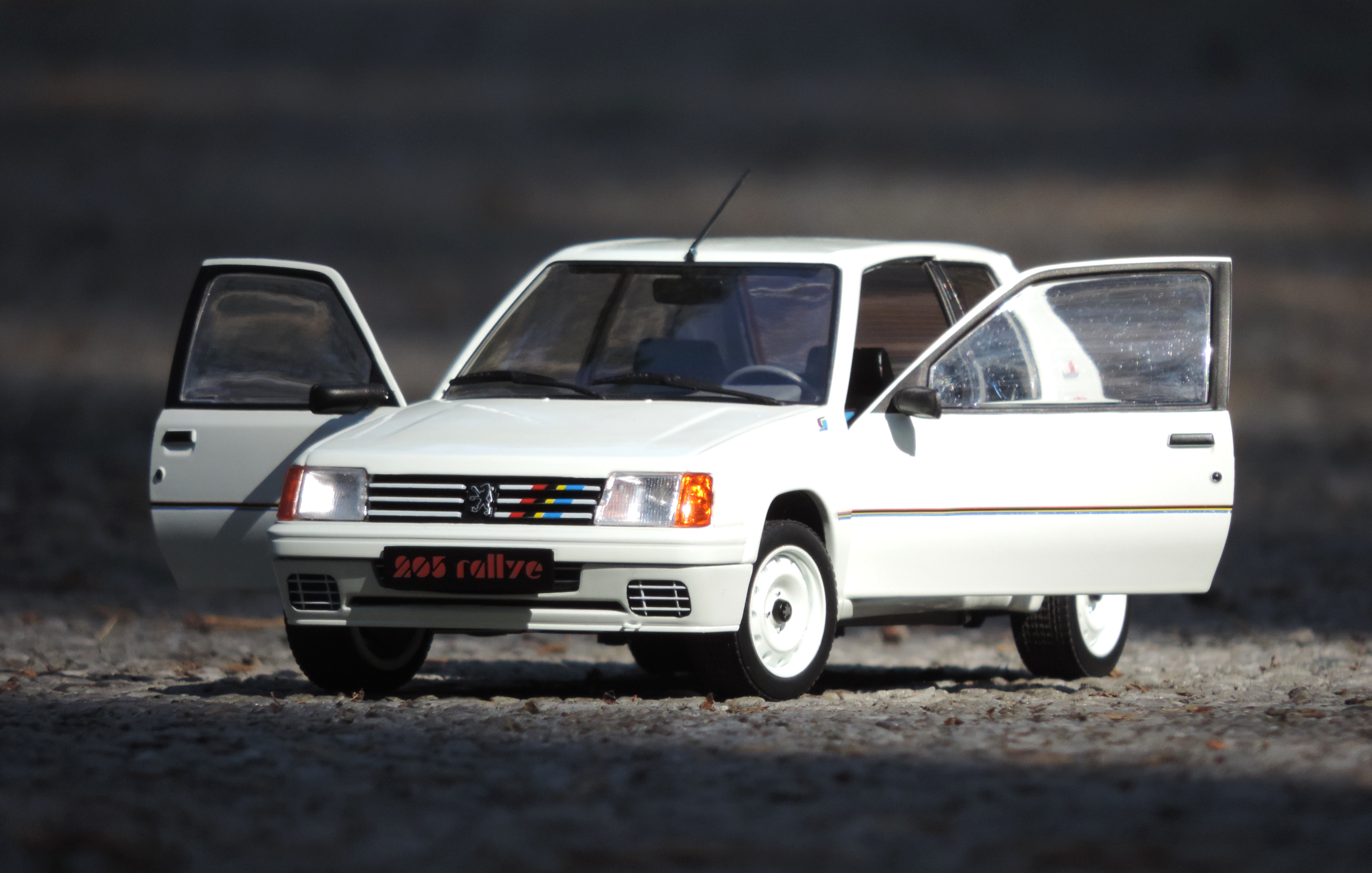
- Type: SARL
- Founded: 1932; 94 years ago in Nanterre
- Founder: Ferdinand de Vazeilles
- Headquarters: Josselin, France
- Key people: Jean Blanche Bertrand Azéma
- Products: Die-cast scale model cars, military vehicles, commercial vehicles
- Owner: Simba Dickie Group
- Number of employees: 55 (in 2025)
- Parent: Simba-Dickie-Group
- Divisions: OttOmobile GT Spirit
- Subsidiaries: Collection models
- Website: solido.com

Solido is a French manufacturer of toys and miniature vehicles created in 1932 by Ferdinand de Vazeilles. The company has been based in Josselin, Morbihan, France, since 2015. Originally a family business, Solido passed into other hands in 1979. Solido was bought by the Simba Dickie Group in 2010, and since 2015 the brand is managed by a French company.

== History ==
=== Founding and initial products ===
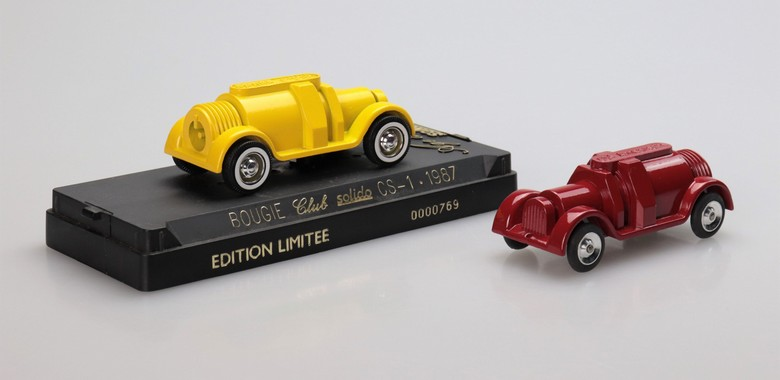
1st model by Solido - Candle Gerogovia

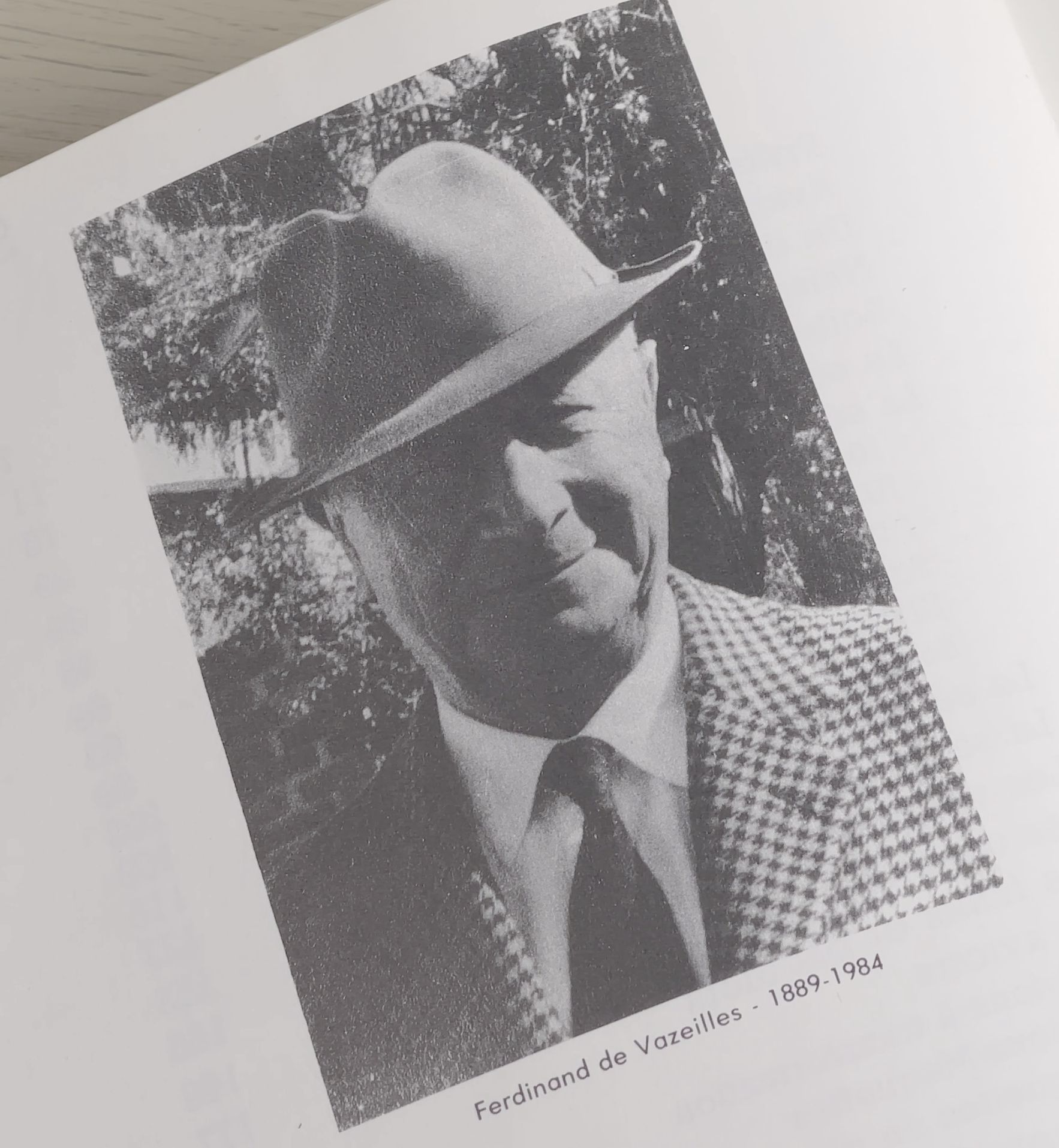
Ferdinand de Vazeilles

In 1919, Ferdinand de Vazeilles created the Nanterre Precision Foundry. It became widely known in Europe for die casting of special materials applied to the automobile and aviation industries. In the 1930s, the foundry sought to diversify and was contacted to mold an object for use in advertising by the company Gergovia, a French manufacturer of auto parts known for its spark plugs. Based on the success of this venture, de Vazeilles decided to start producing metal toys, and filed a patent for this in 1932. Solido began production, and was registered as a brand by de Vazeilles two years later, the name a suggestive reference to the strength of the toys.

Solido's factories remained open and operational despite the Second World War, though production slowed and the materials used were of lower quality. The brand adapted to the situation by offering camouflage toys, as well as a board game of the UK blockade, with ships to be destroyed using small explosive mines.

=== Post-war success ===
After Ferdinand's son Jean joined the family business, Solido expanded its operations significantly, into neighboring countries, the USSR and Japan. Jean de Vazeilles began the first productions of real cars on a miniature scale, leading to the launch of the 100 Series in 1957, launched with the Jaguar Type D Le Mans. The 1/43 scale was chosen to compete with the market leader in the sector at that time, Dinky Toys.

In 1960, Solido developed its first military vehicles and applied for the patent of metal tracks for use on its tanks. The development of opening elements, such as doors, hood and trunk, also enhanced the company's product range. The company also developed product tie-ins with the world of auto sports, such as the 24 Hours of Le Mans, and began working increasingly closely with the car manufacturers. However, the "Bati 1000" products released in this time, a series of miniature 1/43th dioramas in bricks to build, were unsuccessful.

During the 1970s, Solido diversified widely into cars, trucks, construction equipment, tanks, Formula One, police and fire vehicles, helicopters and snowplows. In 1974, the factory moved from Issy-la-Bataille to Oulins. However, the end of the decade marked the end of the family business, as Ferdinand's daughter Charlotte sold the company to toy manufacturer Majorette.

=== 1980s-1990s ===
The 1980s began with the merger of Heller and Solido, announced at the Toy Fair in Nuremberg on February 1, 1981. It was at this time that Emile Véron took over the management of Solido. The co-founder of Norev (Véron upside down) and creator of Majorette was thus appointed to head one of its direct competitors. As an antimilitarist, Véron suspended the Solido's flagship military vehicle range. However, a few years later, following a partnership for the commemorations of the Normandy Landings, he decided to relaunch this series of vehicles, due to public demand. Solido developed significantly under Véron's direction, and in 1989, Solido entered the 1/18 market.

In the 1990s, approximately fifty percent of miniature cars sold in France came from the Majorette-Solido association. Some models of these cars have sold more than a million copies, including the Bugatti Royale and the Char Patton M47. The company sells multiple types of cars, like 1/18 scale and 1/43 scale.

=== 21st century ===
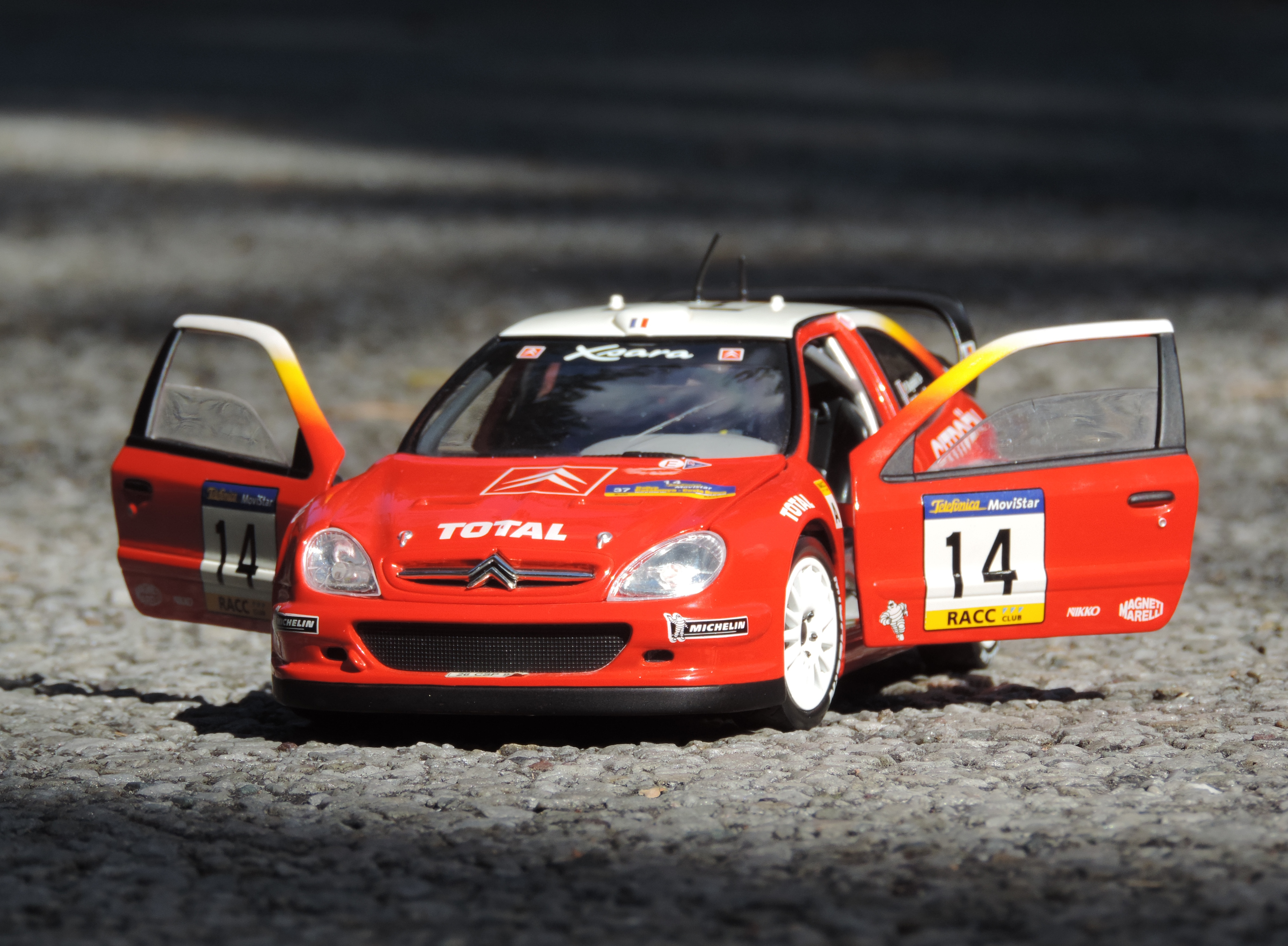
Citroën Xsara WRC at 1/18

In 2003, the Majorette-Solido group was bought by Smoby. Amid a challenging market situation marked by the growing popularity of electronic toys and video games, Solido established partnerships with Peugeot and Citroën for the World Rally Championship and Mitsubishi in Rallye-Raid, as well as launching the new Pajero miniatures to coincide with the Paris-Dakar rally. However, in 2006, Smoby closed the company's plant in Oulins and relocated production to Asia. Smoby went into bankruptcy in October 2007, and in March 2008 Majorette-Solido was sold to the investment fund MI29, while Smoby was sold to Simba Dickie. Majorette-Solido found itself insolvent in November 2009, and was sold to Smoby in February 2010, becoming a part of the German Simba Dickie Group.

In 2015, Simba Dickie wanted to relaunch Solido and handed the management of the brand to Mini Express, a 1/18 scale specialist based in Brittany, known for its OttOmobile brand.

== Logos ==
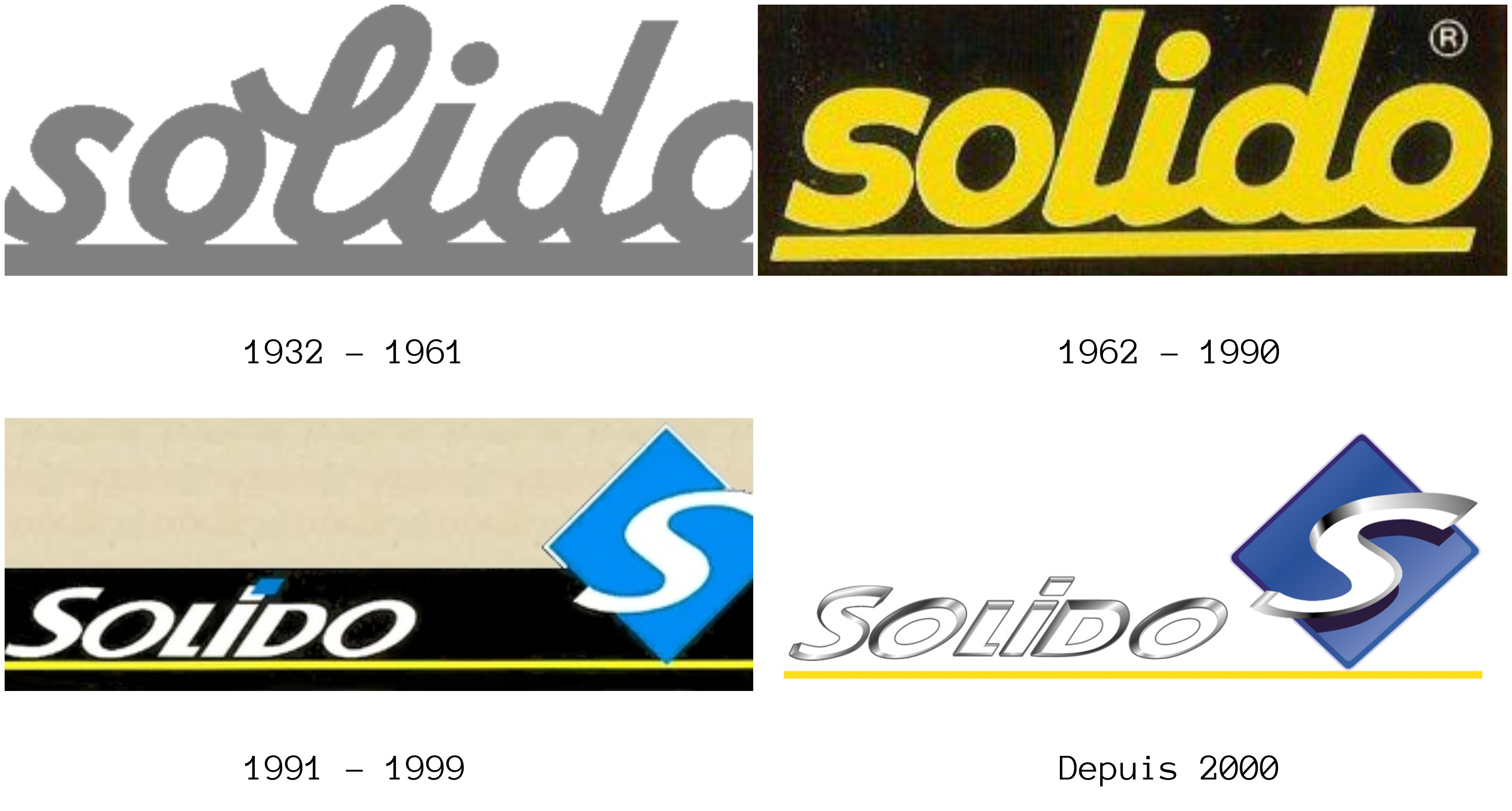
A comparison of the company's different logos over time.

== List of products ==
=== 1/18e scale models (since 2015) ===
- Alfa Romeo Giulia GTA
- Alfa Romeo GTV6
- Alpine A110
- Alpine A110 1600S
- Alpine A290
- Aston Martin DB5
- Autobianchi A112
- Beetle Baja
- Bmw 1602
- BMW 323i (E21)
- BMW 635 (E24) CSI
- BMW 850 (E31) CSi
- BMW E30 M3
- BMW E36 Coupé
- BMW E46 M3
- BMW M2 (G87)
- BMW M3 (G80)
- BMW M3 (G81)
- BMW M4 Performance
- BMW M5 (G90)
- Bugatti Atlantic
- Caterham/Lotus Seven
- Citroën 2CV
- Citroën D Special
- Citroën Dyane 6
- Citroën H
- Citroën Mehari
- Citroën Traction
- Dacia Duster II
- Dodge Challenger
- Fiat 131 Abarth
- Fiat 500
- Fiat F595/695
- Ford Focus RS Mk.2
- Ford GT40
- Ford Puma Rally1 Hybrid
- Ford Ranger Raptor
- Ford Shelby Mustang GT500
- Ford Sierra
- Honda Civic (EG6)
- Lada Niva
- Lancia Delta HF Integrale
- Mazda RX-7
- McLaren 600LT
- McLaren 640 LT
- McLaren F1 GTR Short Tail
- Mercedes-Benz 190 (W201) EVO III
- Mercedes-Benz CLA C118 Coupé AMG
- Mini Cooper Sport
- Nissan GT-R ( R35) W/ Liberty Walk Bodykit
- Nissan Silvia S15
- Nissan Skyline (R34) GT-R
- Peugeot 205
- Peugeot 306 Maxi
- Porsche 356 Pré-A
- Porsche 911 (930)
- Porsche 911 (964)
- Porsche 911 (993)
- Porsche 911 GT3RS
- Porsche 911 IROC
- Porsche 911 RSR
- Porsche 935 K3
- Porsche 935 Mobydick
- Porsche 936
- Porsche 956LH
- Porsche Cayenne
- Porsche Macan
- Renault 17
- Renault 21 Turbo
- Renault 4CV
- Renault 4L
- Renault 4L F4
- Renault 5 GT Turbo
- Renault 5 Maxi
- Renault 5 Turbo
- Renault 8
- Renault Fuego
- Renault Twingo I
- RWB Bodykit
- Shelby Cobra 427
- Shelby GT500
- Skoda Superb
- Subaru Impreza 22B
- Subaru Impreza WRX Sti
- Toyota GR Supra
- Toyota Supra MK.4 (A80)
- Volkswagen Beetle 1303
- Volkswagen Caddy I
- Volkswagen Golf L
- Volkswagen T1
- Volkswagen T2

== Discontinued products ==
Sources:

- The Major series - “140”: This is the very first range produced by Solido. The number corresponded to the length of the chassis in millimetres.
- The Junior series – “100” : Created in 1933 and renamed Junior in 1938, this series was Solido’s success. These are toys to assemble and customize infinitely.
- The "80" series: Launched in 1936, the 80 series was renamed "Baby" in 1938. It is based on the same principle as Duplo for the Lego brand: to offer a range of toys aimed at the youngest children.
- The «Mosquitos» series: A series of very small vehicles to accompany trains on the 00 scale.
- Series 100: Launched in 1957, introduces 1/43 scale cars in the Solido catalogue. This series is very popular with nostalgic collectors.
- Series 10: the second series in 1/43 of the history of Solido. The models are «simpler» than the series 100.
- Series 200: The first series of military vehicles at Solido. For 20 years, it will offer many models and see the Patton Char M47 exceed the million units sold.
- Series 300: dedicated to heavy goods vehicles and construction equipment.
- Series 1300: 1980 marks the transition to a 4-digit numbering at Solido. Initially named Cougar, this series was intended for children. This range competes directly with the cars of Burago at 1/43 scale.
- Series 1500: named «Hi-Fi» then «Today», this series is dedicated to «modern» vehicles and follows the automobile releases of the time.
- Series 1800: launched in 1992, this series features cars from the 70s. It then takes the name of “Yesterday”.
- Series 1900: in 1993, Solido launches a range entirely dedicated to motor racing (rally, endurance, Paris-Dakar). It is also known as “Racing”.
- TonerGam series: includes a lot of commercial vehicles, construction sites, but also the first fire engines.
- Series 4000/4100: these are the models «Age d'Or», which are vehicles of the first half of the twentieth century, like the Bugatti Royale.
- Series 4400: a range of commercial and public transport vehicles called «retro».
- Series 4500: the little sister of the «Age d'Or» series, there are cars from the 60s, European and American.
- Series 6000: developed for the 40th anniversary of the Allied invasion in Normandy, this range relaunches military models and becomes one of the most important in the 90s.
- Series 7000: a series of sets combining several Solido models in the same box. Variations and shapes are numerous.
- Series 8000: the "Prestige" series marks the arrival of the 1/18th in the Solido catalogue. It was launched at the end of the 1980s.
- Series 9000: includes the other vehicles in 1/18, modern or competition car.
- Club Solido: It allowed collectors to get exclusive or limited edition models, to exchange with members but also to visit the factory in Oullins. A range of products was dedicated to it.

== Bibliography ==
- Les Automobiles de Solido 1932-1957, Bertrand Azéma, Éditions Drivers, 1991.
- Les Automobiles de Solido 1957-1991, Bertrand Azéma, Éditions Drivers, 1991.
- Les Automobiles de Solido 1991-2004, Bertrand Azéma, Éditions Drivers, 2004.

== Photos complémentaires ==
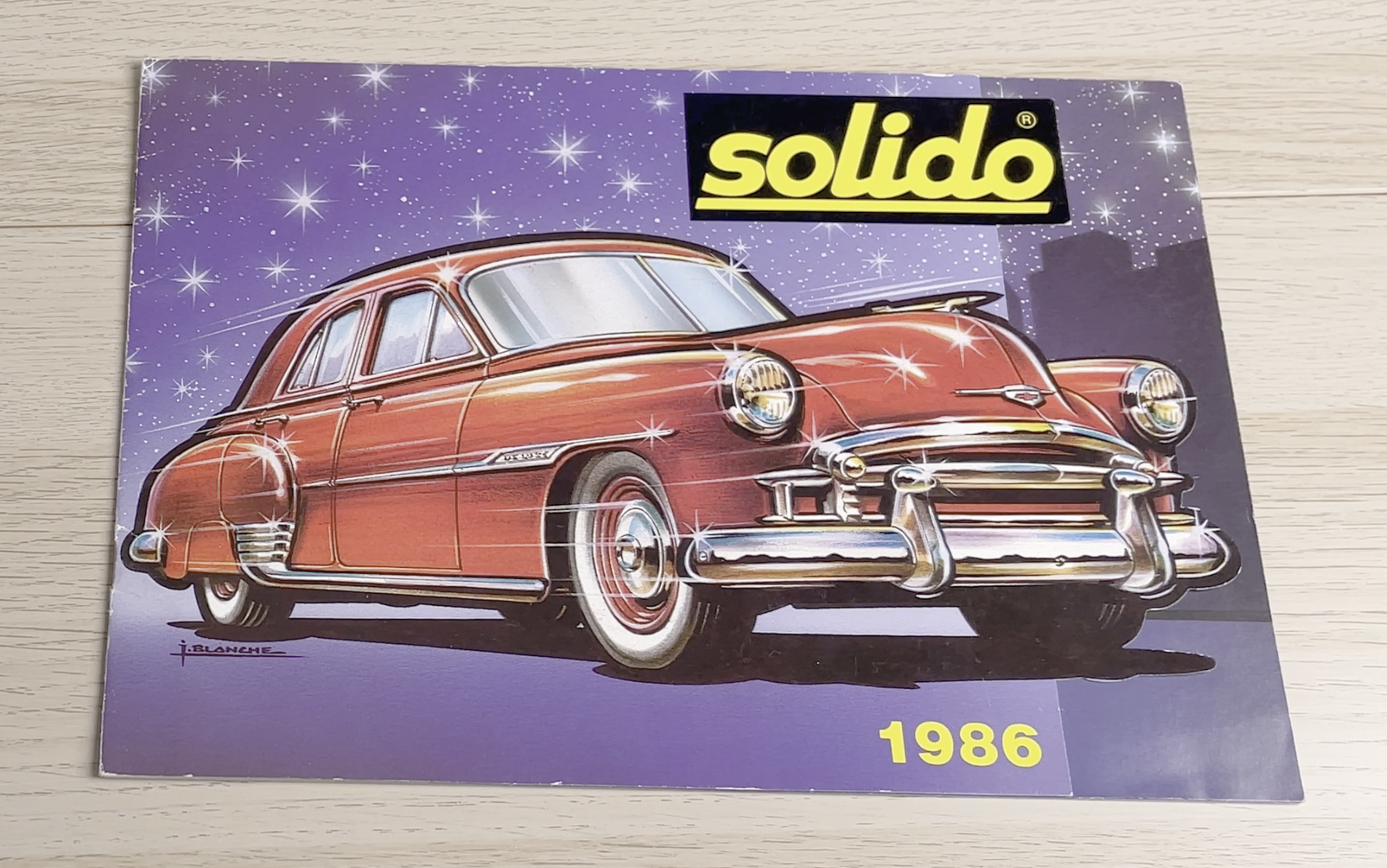

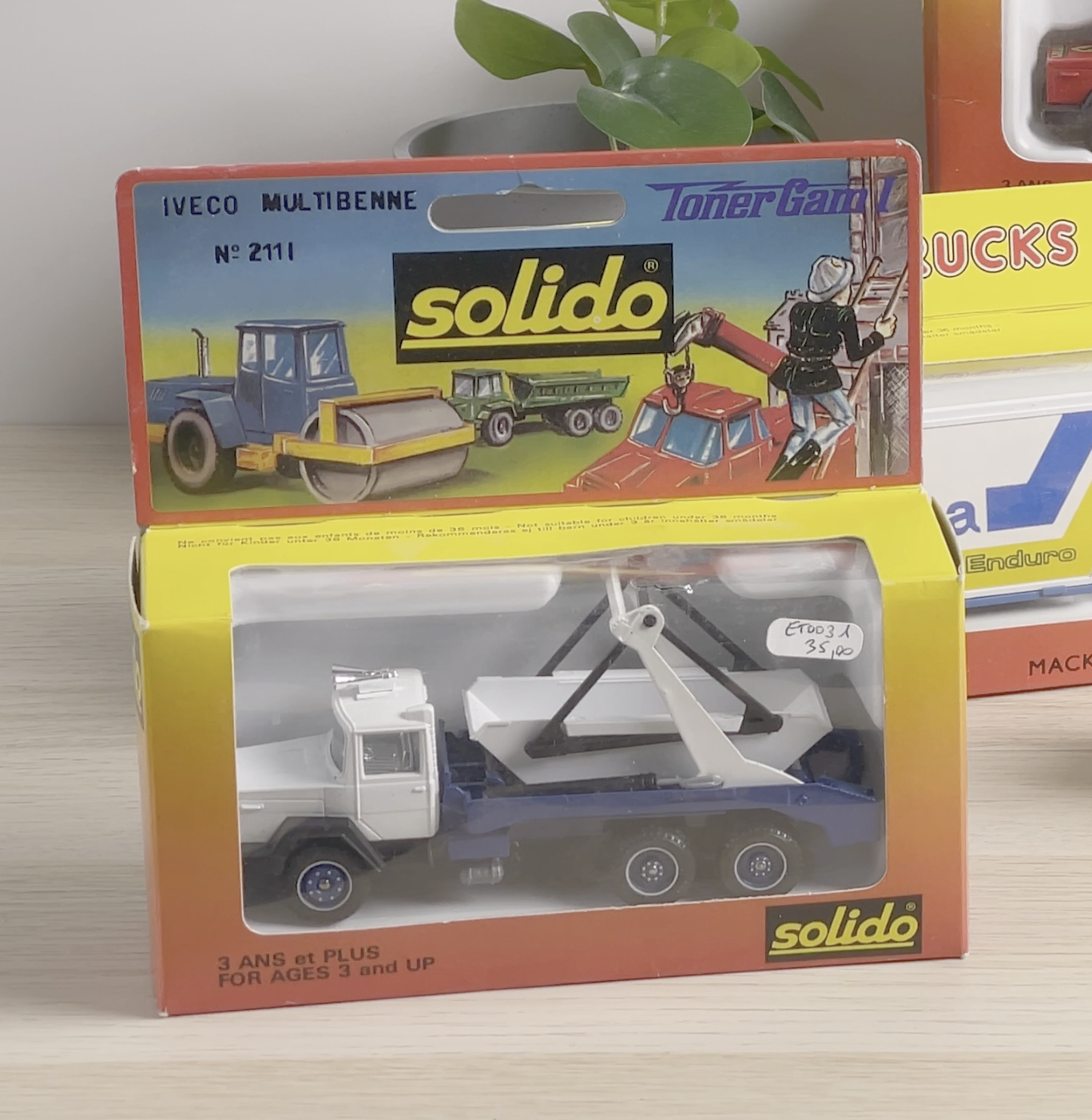

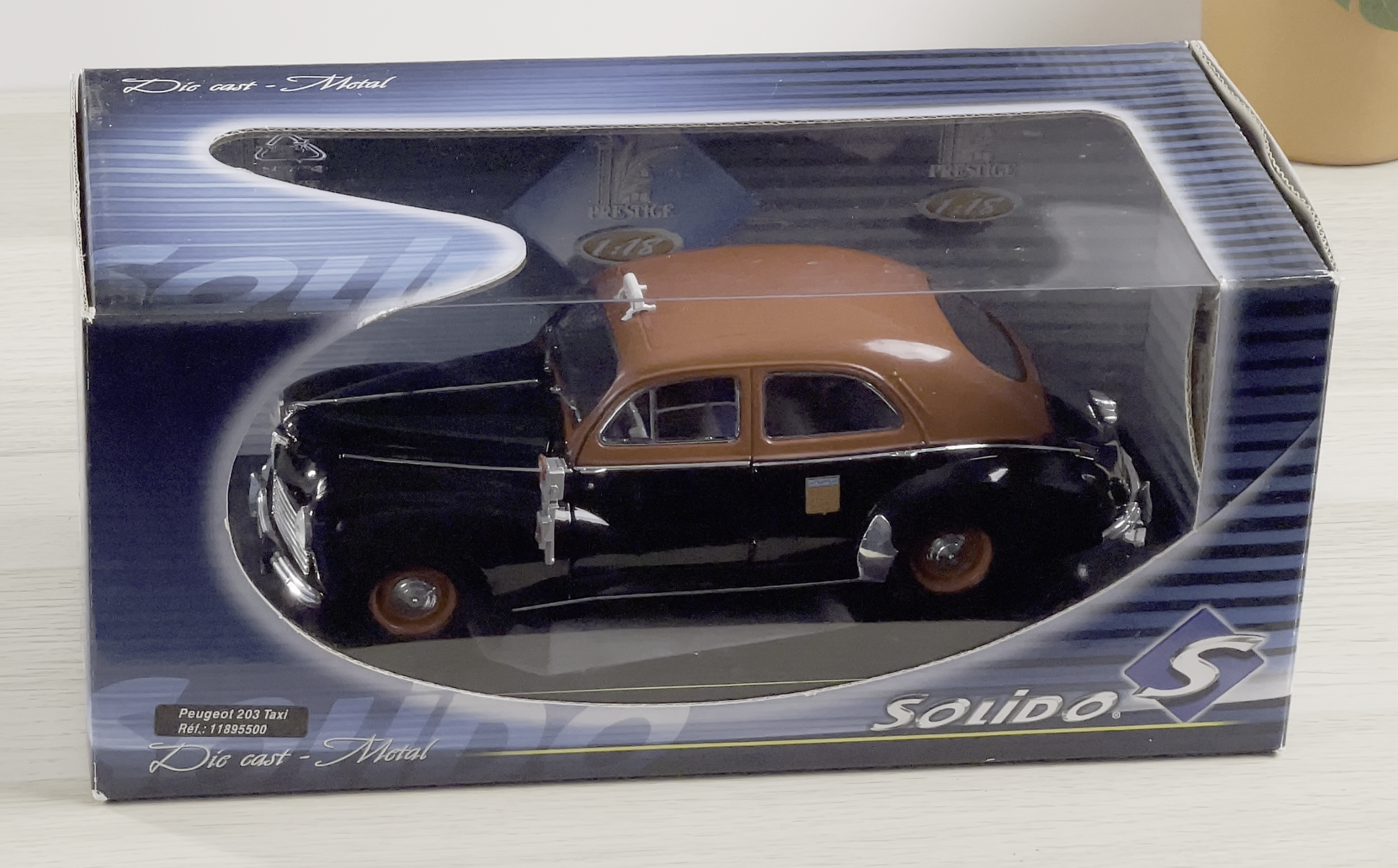

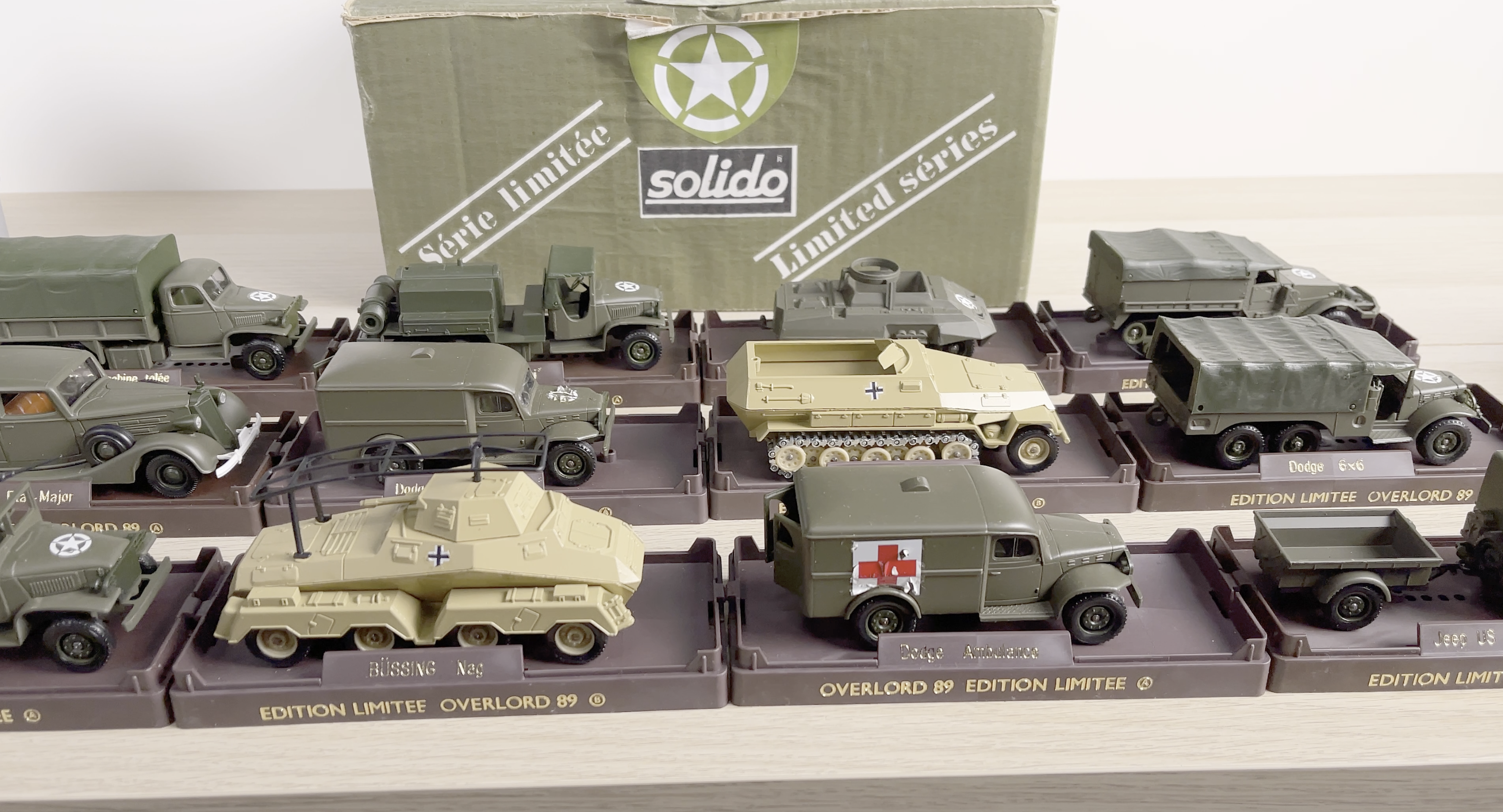

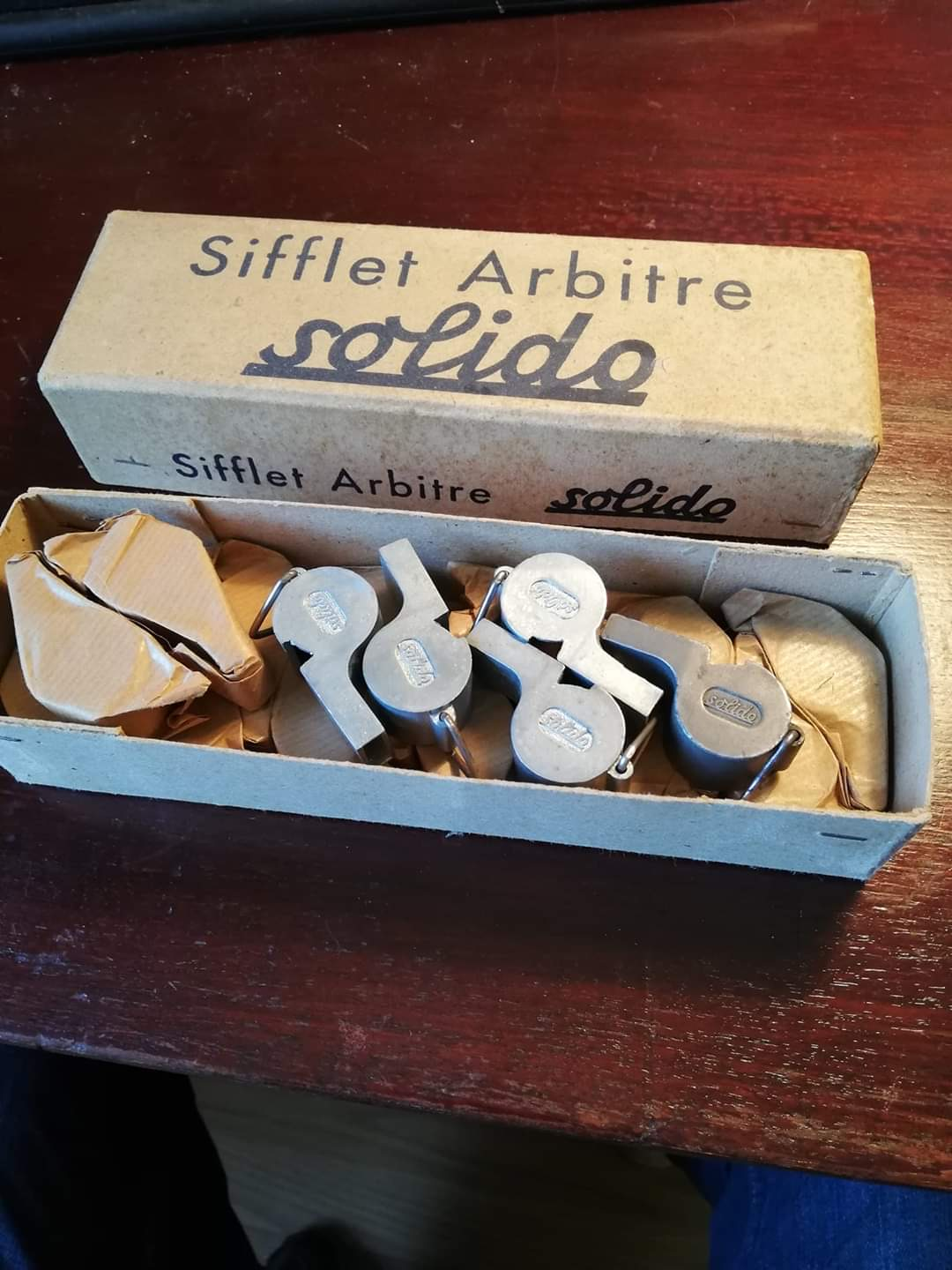
