= Nik Naks =

Nik Naks may refer to:

- NikNaks (South African snack), a brand of corn extruded snack produced by the Simba Chip company in South Africa
- Nik Naks (British snack), a brand of corn extruded snack produced by KP Snacks in the United Kingdom
