= Majo-kit =

Toy line developed by the Majorette company

Majo-kit is a toy line developed by Majorette. Together, they form a complete city traffic environment that also includes farms and factories.

Majo-kits are made from plastic materials with a certain amount of detail. They were designed for children and should not be considered an accurate representation of anything in particular. The separate pieces snap together to form scale size towns and cities for Majorette or other similar size model vehicles. Children are introduced to rules of the road by laying out and obeying traffic signs, and learn to navigate streets with road issues, roundabouts and traffic lights. The Majo-kit buildings are actually too big for the Majorette vehicles but they needed to be a certain size to make them easy to assemble for smaller children.

Many different kits with their own theme were made and all are compatible with each other. This allows children (it was mostly aimed at boys) to keep adding streets and structures. The kits were sold in Europe, Canada, Costa Rica, Australia, New Zealand, and the United States. All of the Majo-kit figures are men, and there are no women or children.

== Pieces ==
Individual pieces included but were not limited to:

- Bus stop shelters
- Trees
- Park benches
- Fountains
- Flowers and pots
- Picnic benches and tables
- Exterior lighting
- Canopies and shelters
- Fire hydrants
- Emergency call boxes
- Phone booths
- Traffic signs
- Changeable (by hand) traffic lights
- Cross walk inserts
- Auto repair items such as lifts and tools
- Fuel pumps
- Guard rails
- Fencing
- Supports
- Farm accessories
- Parking meters
- Toll booths

== Kits ==
Two or more small kits were packaged together as a larger kit sold at a lower price than that of the small kits separately.

Examples of sets or kits include:

- Post office
- Restaurant
- Hotel
- Bank
- Hospital
- Gas stations (includes Esso stations, Shell stations, and a generic self-service version)
- Car wash
- Car repair shops
- Filling station
- Fire station
- Police station
- Toll booth and customs post
- Airport
- Farm
- Factory

There were also smaller kits consisting of figures, a Majorette vehicle, stickers for the vehicle and various tools or other items. These were like Lego's mini-figure sets. Some of these include:

- Construction Crew (with construction vehicle, hardhats, jackhammer & other tools)
- Firefighters
- Medical squad
- Police squad
- Farmers
- Gardeners
- Mechanics
