= CIJ =

French brand of toy vehicles

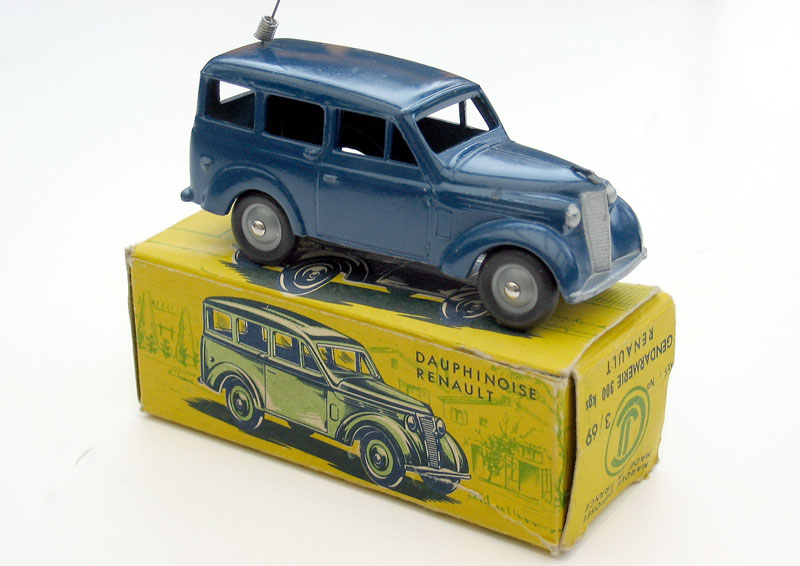
Police car by CIJ - 1958

CIJ is the acronym for Compagnie Industrielle du Jouet (or "Manufacturing Company of Toys"). It was a classic French brand of diecast metal toy vehicles. It was founded by Fernand Migault in Paris in 1920. The company name originally was Migault S.A. at the time that Migault's cousin Marcel Gourdet joined the firm.

== History ==
On the grounds of contracts signed by André Citroën himself in 1922, the company produced exclusive model cars made of either metal or wood in 1:20, including la 5 CV Trèfle and la B14 Citroën. These model cars were distributed solely by authorised Citroën dealers. However, the company was not allowed to advertise their cooperation with Citroën.

The metals workshop in Briare, which Marcel Gourdet had brought to Ferdinand Migault's company, burned down in 1929. At that time, the Bapterosses family provided capital to rebuild the company. The company moved its headquarters back to Paris, eventually employing more than a hundred people, mostly in the Briare factory.

The exclusive production of model cars for Citroën ended in 1934 when Citroën went into administration and was eventually taken over by Michelin. Many years later, CIJ signed a less binding contract with Louis Renault concerning numerous types of Renault model cars in scales ranging from 1:10 to 1:43, partly made of lithographed metal, or in particular, zamak. This time, CIJ was solely responsible for distribution. An agreement with Shell for miniatures of filling stations, including the transporter Shell Berre was signed in 1950. This model car was made of an alloy called ramec (which blended aluminium, copper, zinc and magnesium). On 27 December 1964, new facilities were inaugurated in Briare. But one year later, after the company had bought the stash of its former competitor JRD, the company CIJ effectively disappeared. The Bapterosses family kept on producing exclusive series' of artisan type models in the Rivotte farm (in the vicinity of the factory) but the Briare works were absorbed by ITT and produced henceforth parts for telephones.

== The model cars ==
The first model cars were completely made from iron sheet or wood (scale from 1:6 to 1:43) and because of the high quality CIJ could compete with other contemporary producer such as Dinky Toys and Norev. In April 2007, Norev acquired the CIJ brand and announced the release of 13 model cars made from zamac and two lithographed models from iron sheet (4CV Renault and Juvaquatre), which were re-editions of the original CIJ model cars. These CIJ models had actually been reintroduced as a brand under the Norev umbrella around 2005.

== Bibliography ==
- Pascale Nourisson (2001). Une aventure industrielle. La manufacture de Briare (1837-1962) (in French). ISBN 2-84253-558-8.
- Jean-Pierre Roth (2002). Le Giennois industriel 1821 à 2001 (in French). location. ISBN 2-9517946-0-6.
