= Sinbad (disambiguation) =

Sinbad the Sailor, Sinbad, or Sindbad, is a fictional mariner and the hero hailing from Baghdad of the early Abbasid Caliphate (8th–9th centuries A.D.), whose adventures appeared in the One Thousand and One Nights.

Sinbad may also refer to:

== People ==
- Sinbad (comedian)
- Sunpadh or Sinbad the Magus (fl. 8th century), Iranian religious leader and activist

== Arts, entertainment, and media ==
=== Fictional characters ===
- Sinbad the Sailor, an alias of Edmond Dantes from The Count of Monte Cristo
- Sinbad (Brookside), a character in Brookside
- Sinbad, a character from the Japanese manga/anime, Magi; and the main character in Magi: Adventure of Sinbad, loosely based on the original character
- Sinbad, a character in Sonic and the secret rings

=== Films ===
- Sinbad the Sailor (1935 film)
- Sinbad the Sailor (1947 film), starring Douglas Fairbanks Jr
- Sinbad (1992 film), a Japanese animated film
- Sinbad: Legend of the Seven Seas (2003)
- Sinbad (film series) (2015-2016), a Japanese animated film trilogy

=== Television ===
- Arabian Nights: Sinbad's Adventures (TV series), a 1975 Japanese anime series
- Sinbad (TV series), a 2012 UK television series
- The Adventures of Sinbad, a 1996 Canadian TV series
- "Sinbad", a season 1 episode of The Eric Andre Show
- Sinbad Jr. and His Magic Belt, a cartoon TV series

=== Theater ===
- Sinbad (1891 musical)
- Sinbad (1918 musical)

== Other uses ==
- Sinbad (album), 1976 jazz album by Weldon Irvine
- Sinbad (dog) (1937-1951), a dog formally enlisted into the United States Coast Guard, that held the rank of Chief Dog, equivalent to Chief Petty Officer
- MV Sinbad or HMS Audacity
- 41488 Sindbad, an asteroid

== See also ==
- Simbad (disambiguation)
- Syntipas, purported ancient Indian author of the Seven Wise Masters, a cycle of stories popular in medieval literature
- Szindbád, a 1971 Hungarian film by Zoltán Huszárik
- Sindbad Submarines, a company involved in the 2025 Red Sea tourist submarine disaster
