= Bobby Car =

Children's toy car

A Bobby Car is a brand of ride-on toy car, a four-wheeled vehicle without pedals, on which children can move by pushing with their feet. It has been produced by the German company BIG Spielwarenfabrik since 1972 and, with 20 million units sold, is considered the best-selling children’s vehicle in the world.

The Classic model is red, made of plastic and is about 60 cm long and 40 cm high. It has four wheels.

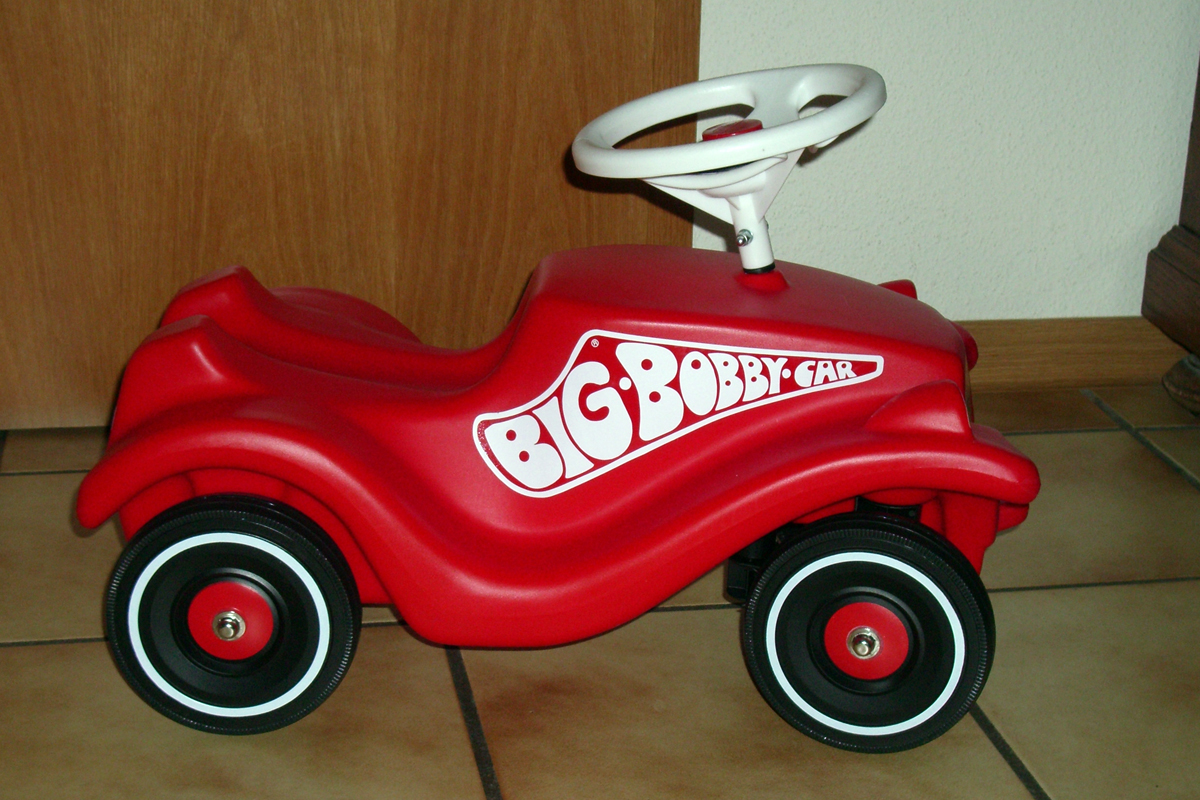
Bobby Car Classic

== Bobby Car for children ==
The Bobby Car was invented in order to help children learn to walk. It has a kind of seat in which the child can sit as on a motorcycle. By swinging their legs, the child can move the car. Today, numerous accessories exist such as connecting rods, light running tires, trailer and so on. As well as being manufactured in different colours, it also comes in variants such as a police car or tow truck. Special editions have been made to honour well-known German cars, such as Mercedes-Benz SLK, Audi TT, Smart and Volkswagen Beetle. In cooperation with tire manufacturer Fulda, a model having real tires, rather than the usual hard plastic variety was produced.

== Bobby car racing ==
In the 1990s another use of Bobby Cars emerged: Professional competitive driving. The plastic body is strong enough to carry an adult. The steering element and the axles are strengthened to handle high speeds (approximately 60 km/h). Competitions are held on closed roads with steep downward gradients.

The official world speed record of a modified gravity-powered Bobby Car was set on 28 May 2022 by Marcel Paul from the Bobby Car Club Altenhain / Bad Soden, who achieved a speed of 130.72 km/h. The speed record in the second discipline with a classic bobby car with plastic tires at 106.01 km/h was also set by Marcel Paul. The Record Institute for Germany has recognized both top values. On August 10, 2023, Marcel Paul once again attempted a world record. This time, he reached a speed of 148.45 km/h on an electrically powered Bobby-Car. The record attempt took place on the Parabolika section of the racetrack at Hockenheimring. The electrically powered Bobby-Car record was additionally registered by Guinness World Records in the category of Fastest ride-on toy car (modified).
