= Simba (South African company) =

South African snack food manufacturer

Simba (Pty) Ltd.
- Type: Subsidiary
- Industry: Food
- Founded: 1957; 69 years ago in Gauteng, South Africa
- Founder: Leon Greyvensteyn
- Headquarters: Isando (Ekurhuleni), South Africa
- Area served: Southern Africa
- Products: Snack food
- Brands: List: Simba Chips; Cheetos; Doritos; Fritos; Lay's; NikNaks
- Parent: PepsiCo
- Website: simba.co.za

Simba (Pty) Ltd. (commonly referred to as Simba) is a South African snack food manufacturer mainly operating in South Africa. It was founded in 1957 by Leon Greyvensteyn, and acquired by PepsiCo in 1999. It is best known for manufacturing potato and maize-based snack foods. They hold 63 percent of the South African crisps market.

== History ==
The company's roots can be traced to 1939 when Elizabeth Ann Greyvensteyn, known as "Ouma Nannie", turned a family rusk recipe sold at church fetes, to a business making the rusks on a commercial scale for sale in Johannesburg. They obtained a loan of R3,000 from the Industrial Development Corporation in 1940 to expand their business. Andre Greyvensteyn, her son, joined the business in March 1945 when he left his job in Johannesburg. The rusks were originally sold as Uitspan and Outspan Rusks but were later renamed as Ouma Rusks. In the 1970s, the rusk part of the business was sold to Fedfood which later sold the business to other companies.

In 1955, after a tour of America, Andre Greyvensteyn started the chip business and would become the chairperson of Simba in 1960 on the death of his father.
