= Émile Véron =

French businessman (1925–2013)

- Born: 26 March 1925; Lyon, France
- Died: 20 November 2013 (aged 88); Lyon, France
- Occupation: Entrepreneur

Émile Véron (26 March 1925 – 20 November 2013) was a French entrepreneur that created the model car brand Norev with his two brothers, Joseph and Paul, in 1946. The name of the company is his name spelled backwards.

He later created the toy company Majorette in 1961.

For his conduct he was awarded the National Order of the Legion of Honour, but 1992-1993 had judicial problems related to the failure of Majorette.
