= Zimba =

Zimba may refer to:

== People ==
- Atongo Zimba (born 1967), a musician from Ghana
- Denis Zimba (born 1971), a Zambian boxer
- Denise Zimba (born 1988), a South African actress
- Lawrence Zimba (born 1955), a Zambian politician
- Neeraj Zimba (born 1981), an Indian Politician
- Yeshey Zimba (born 1952), a Bhutanese politician
- Zumani Zimba, a Zambian politician

== Places ==
- Zimba (mountain), in the Rätikon range, Austria
- Zimba, Zambia
- Zimba District, Zambia

== Language ==
- Zimba language, a Bantu language of the Democratic Republic of the Congo
- Zemba language, a Bantu language spoken mainly in Angola

== Other uses ==
- Zimba (East Africa), 16th-century militaristic group/s

== See also ==
- Simba (disambiguation)
- Zumba (disambiguation)
- Zimbabwe, a country in southern Africa
