= Simbad =

Simbad may refer to:

- Simbad missile, a version of the Mistral
- Simbad robot simulator, a software simulator
- SIMBAD, a database of astronomical information
  - 4692 SIMBAD, an asteroid named in honour of the astronomical database.

== See also ==
- Sinbad (disambiguation)
