= Simbarashe =

Simbarashe is a given name. Notable people with the name include:

- Simbarashe Mumbengegwi (born 1945) Zimbabwean politician
- Simbarashe Gupo (born 1989) Zimbabwean cricketer
