= Saviem SM Europe =

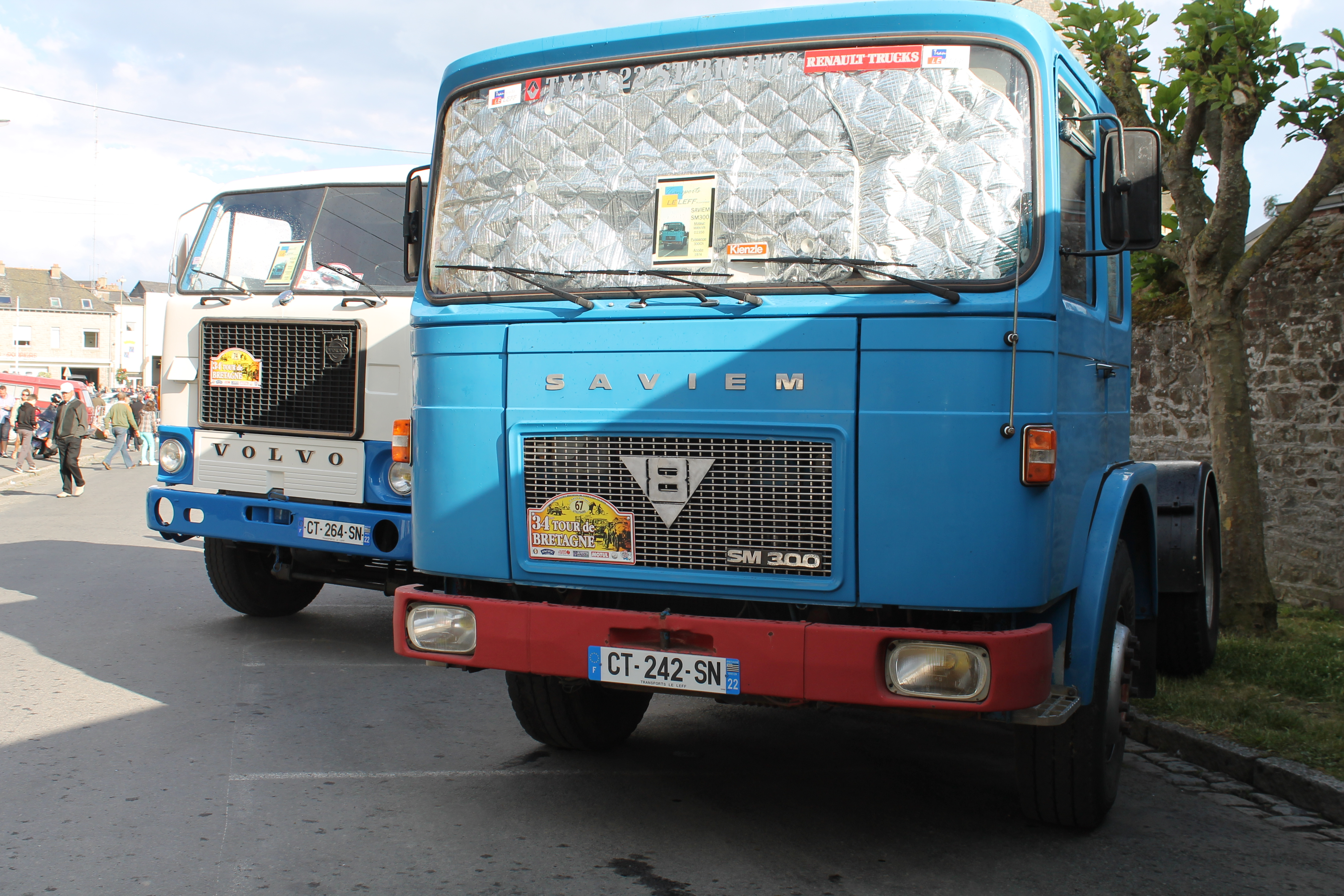

Overview
- Manufacturer: Saviem
- Production: 1967–1977
- Assembly: Blainville-sur-Orne, France

Body and chassis
- Class: Heavy/medium truck
- Body style: COE

Powertrain
- Engine: 7.3L straight-six engine 10.69L straight-six engine 15L V8 engine
- Transmission: Manual

Dimensions
- Wheelbase: 130 inches (3,302 mm)–150 inches (3,810 mm) (Note: All dimensions are for the SM300's tractor unit without towed cargo.)
- Length: 224.5 inches (5,702 mm)
- Width: 98.25 inches (2,496 mm)
- Height: 112 inches (2,845 mm)

Chronology
- Successor: Saviem PS

The SM Europe was a range of medium/heavy trucks manufactured by the French company Saviem.

== History ==
In 1967, Saviem launched the Europe cab (Type 860), as part of its extended collaboration with the German MAN. The new cab was also used by MAN models. In return, MAN supplied the engines fitted to the Renault models with the Europe cab (SM10, SM12, SM170, SM200, SM240, SM 260, SM280 and SM300/340 V8).

== Technical details ==
=== SM 10 ===
The SM 10 was powered by the 7.26-litre MAN 0846 HMN84 straight-six engine with a maximum power output of 170 PS (170 bhp; 130 kW). The gearbox was the 6-speed Saviem 330.

=== SM 240 and SM280 ===
Both the SM 240 and SM 280 models were powered by an outdated 10.69-litre MAN 2156 turbocharged straight-six engine with a maximum power output of 202 bhp (205 PS; 151 kW). The 32-tonne GVW SM 240 was the only model sold under the Saviem badge in the UK by early 1975. The SM 280 was 36 tonnes GVW. The trucks used a 12-speed manual gearbox from ZF.

=== SM300 and SM340 V8 ===
The SM300 range was powered by an outdated, Saviem-tuned 14.96-litre 2858 M3 MAN V8 engine with a maximum power output of 304 bhp (308 PS; 227 kW) at 2,200 rpm and a torque of 1,030 N⋅m (760 lb⋅ft) at 1,600 rpm. Older versions used the similar 2658 M42 version. The gearbox was a 10-speed "synchromesh" unit developed by Saviem and codenamed 350. Brakes were air-operated drums. Suspension was made of leaf springs on both axles, with telescopic dampers on front and anti-roll bar on rear. The trucks had a 38-tonne GVW as a maximum.
