= Mohamed Saïd Ouma =

African heritage film director and screenwriter

Mohamed Saïd Ouma is a film director and screenwriter who has been responsible for production and a programming assistant for the International African Film Festival of Africa and the Islands (FIFAI) in the city of Port à l'Ile in Réunion Island since 2004. Before that he worked as a journalist in England for several years. FIFAI is organized by Alain Gili and Mohamed Said Ouma. The festival honors productions that are often ignored on the African continent, and also honors works made in the islands.

His 2007 documentary film Le Mythe de la cinquième île (The myth of the fifth island) explores how an immigrant from the Comoros islands adjusts to living in Coldharbour Lane in Brixton, London with men from Croatia and Sicily, girls from Spain and Norway. The short sequel, Matso, épilogue du mythe de la cinquième île is a political documentary about illegal migration between the Comoros Island and Mayotte.

== Filmography ==
Year	Title	!Type	Length	Role	Notes
2007	Le mythe de la cinquième île	documentary	56 mins	Director	Production : Les films façon façon
2007	Matso, épilogue du mythe de la cinquième île	Documentary	5 mins	Director	Production : Les films façon façon
2006	Les mariés de l'Isle Bourbon	Téléfilm	2x90 mins	Script from Euzhan Palcy	Production : Exilènes films &France 3
2005	Stealing a nation	Documentary	52 minutes	Translation to French version from John Pilger	Production : ITN &Imago Production
2002	De la visibilité	Documentary	12 minutes	Director	Production : Collectif B.I.Z
1999	Je rap donc je suis de Philipes Roizes	Documentary	76 minutes	Assistant Director	Production : Arte France&Panoptique
1997	Aktuel Force	Documentary	26 minutes	Director	Production :Sp 35
