= Ouma Rusks =

South African rusk brand

Ouma

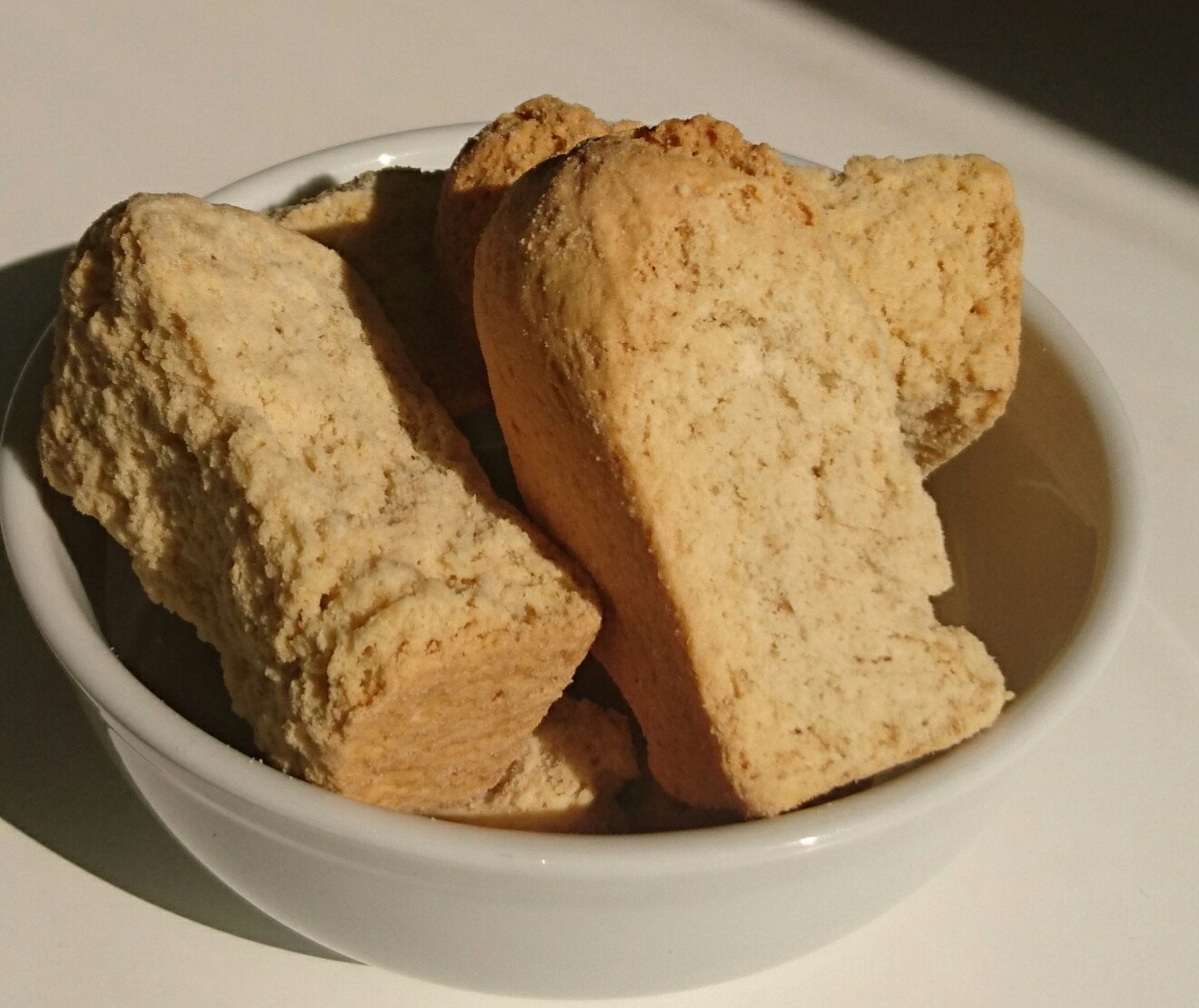
- Plain Ouma Rusks
- Product type: Rusk
- Current owner: RCL Foods (2013)
- Country: South Africa
- Introduced: 1939; 87 years ago
- Markets: Southern Africa
- Previous owners: Greyvenstyn Family (1939); Fedfood (1977); Foodcorp (1992)
- Tagline: Baked on the original farm
- Website: www.rclfoods.com/ouma

Ouma (/ˈoʊ.mɑː/; commonly referred to as Ouma Rusks) is a South African rusk made from a traditional buttermilk recipe. It was first produced in the rural town of Molteno, in the Eastern Cape, by Elizabeth Ann Greyvenstyn in 1939, in response to an initiative by the town's pastor to help the entrepreneurial efforts of the women in his congregation. The brand currently dominates the relatively-small local rusk market, and is manufactured in the same town it was first produced.

== History ==
In an effort to reduce the negative impact of the Great Depression, the town's pastor offered each female member of his congregation money to start local businesses and increase their family income. They each received a half-crown, which is equivalent to two shillings and sixpence (roughly worth £30 or R520 in 2016).

They were first sold under the brand name "Outspan Rusks" but was changed soon after to 'Ouma' (Afrikaans for grandmother).

In 1941, the fledgling governmental Industrial Development Corporation (South Africa) gave its first start-up loan to Ouma Rusks for £1,500. Elizabeth's grandson, Leon Greyvensteyn, who was involved in the establishment and management of the company, went on to found the Simba Chip company in 1956.

Ouma became part of Fedfood in the 1970s, and since 1992 has been owned by Foodcorp (South Africa). As of 2012, Foodcorp still maintains an Ouma Rusks factory in the town of Molteno employing 250 people.

== Factory ==
The Ouma factory in Molteno is currently the largest employer in the town, with 250 employees.

== Advertising ==
Ouma Rusk's advertising slogan ‘Let’s go and dip an Ouma’ is well known in South Africa.
