= Norev =

French toy car maker

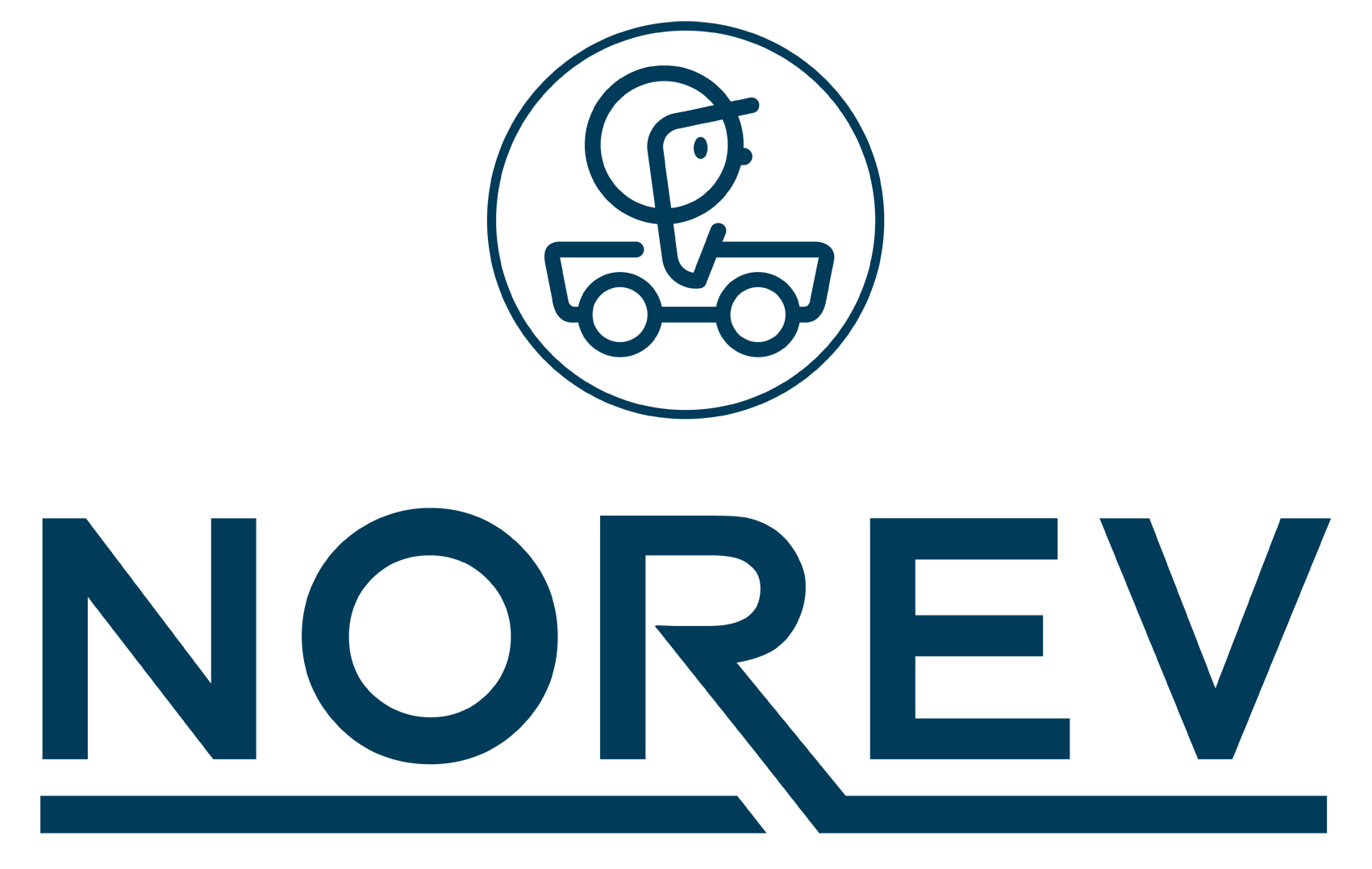
- Industry: manufacturing of games and toys
- Founded: 1946; 80 years ago
- Founder: Véron brothers
- Headquarters: Villeurbanne, France
- Products: Die-cast scale model cars
- Website: norev.com

Norev is a French manufacturer of die-cast scale model cars. Traditionally based in Villeurbanne, a suburb of Lyon. It has normally produced modern and vintage European vehicles, especially those of French origin – though Italian, German, British, and American vehicles were also produced. Norev's closest competition was Solido, but that company had more pan-European influence, while Norev was more national in orientation.

== History ==
According to the official website, Norev was founded by the Véron brothers, in the suburb of Villeurbanne, near Lyon, in 1946. Norev is the family name spelled backwards. In 1953, after the first plastics toy fair in Oyonnax, Joseph Véron started using the new plastic 'Rhodialite' for a series of toys. The company's first product was a small tin service garage with several plastic cars in about 1/87 scale. Other products at the company's start were toy watches, miniature sewing machines, a doll's feeding set and other plastic toys for infants.

Also in 1953, was the watershed of the first Norev vehicles to appear. These were in 1:43 scale and manufactured in plastic. The plastic series consisted of 12 vehicles up through 1956, but then expanded rapidly to more than 96 models in 1964. Force's book shows that throughout the whole run of all Norev vehicles, without regard to scale or type, models were sequentially numbered from the first car as no. 1 in plastic (a Simca Aronde – 1953–1956) through no. 899 in zamac (a VW Golf Rally – 1984–1988) and beyond.

The early models had colorful unpainted bodies which was a main selling point. While earlier models tended to feature semi-realistic colors similar to what contemporary car manufacturers were offering, later models tended to stray away from realism and offered vibrant, less realistic colors, such as bright orange or lime green. In the mid-1960s, Norev toyed with the idea of adopting colorless plastic bodies which would then be spray-painted in metallic colors. The experiment seemed to have been fairly short-lived, with only 5 known models released: the Ford Anglia 105E Deluxe, the Lancia Flaminia, the Fiat 2300, the DAF Daffodil and the Morris Mini 850.

Initially, the models chosen were French cars, such as the Simca Aronde (the first Norev model introduced), Renault 4CV, Ford Vedette, Peugeot 203, Citroën DS 19, Renault Dauphine, Panhard Dyna Z, Peugeot 403 and Citroën H Van, among others. The first non-French model to be released was the Mercedes-Benz W196 racecar in 1956, followed by the Jaguar 2.4L MK1 saloon a year later. As the years progressed, foreign cars would be added to the Norev range in rapid succession.

== Model details ==
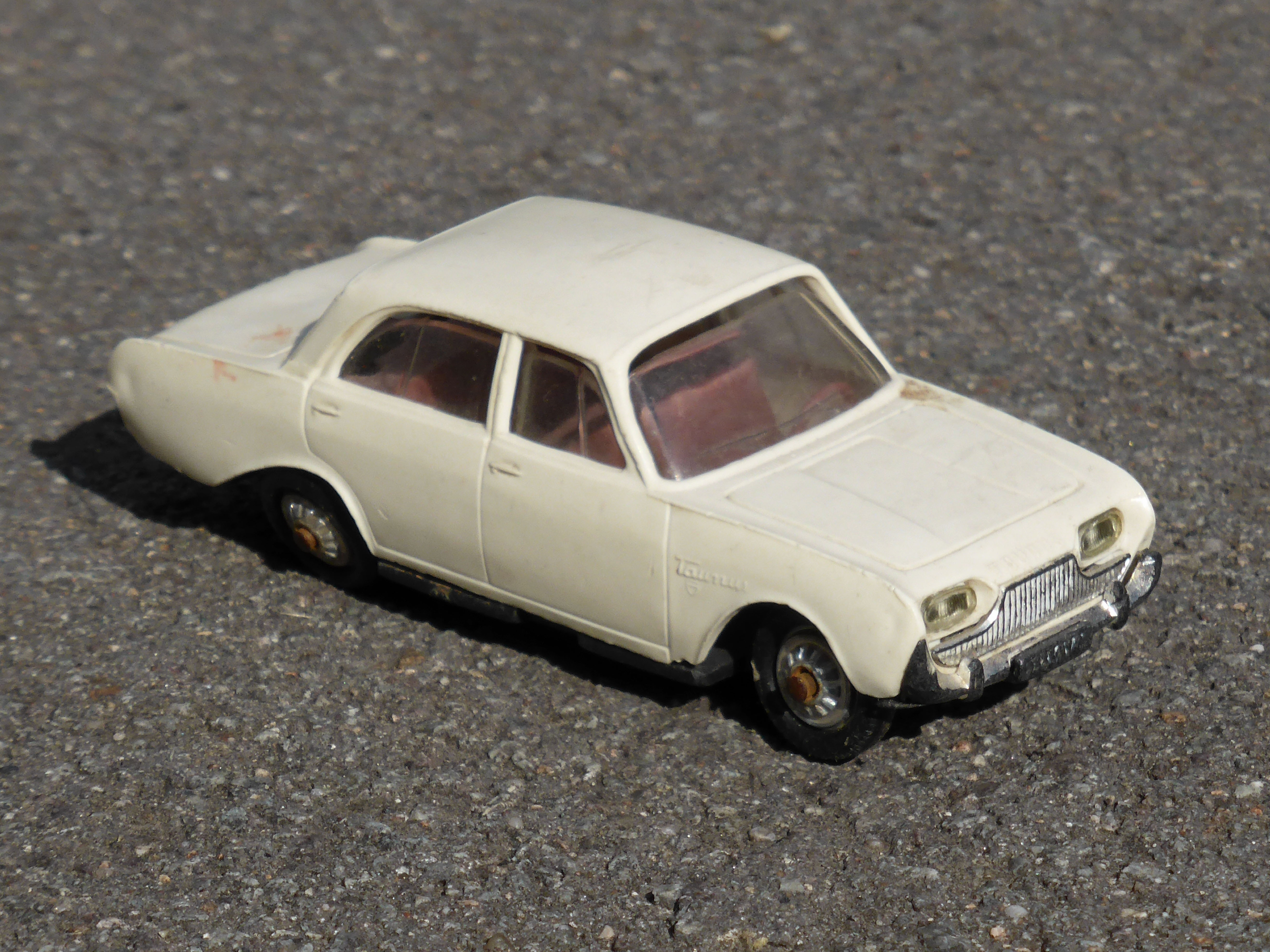
Plastic model Ford Taunus 17M in 1:43 scale from Norev

Norev plastic models were known for their bright body colors and their red (sometimes black) plastic hubs with white tires. Some of the attention to detail is notable, such as with the Citroën DS sedan. For instance, on the real car, the roof section is a separate plastic piece. The Norev toy also made the roof a separate plastic section, allowing for a greater variety of color combinations. In addition to this, Norev released all 3 versions of the DS19: the initial version launched in 1956, the first facelift with metal hood vents to aid cooling, released in 1961, and the second facelift in 1963, where the hood vents were replaced with holes under the headlights. Unfortunately, the Rhodialite plastic used in the models was prone to fading and warping after excessive exposure to sunlight. By the mid-1970s, Norev did rectify this via the usage of a lighter plastic with a more matte finish,

Most early models were available in both free-wheeling and friction motor versions, though the motorised models were discontinued by the early 1960s. Early bases were unpainted and made of metal, but from 1956 onwards, models started being equipped with black plastic ones. Detail and proportion were very good and though the early models lacked windows (the Citroën DS was the first model to sport them), they were very successful and cheaper than the diecast metal competition.

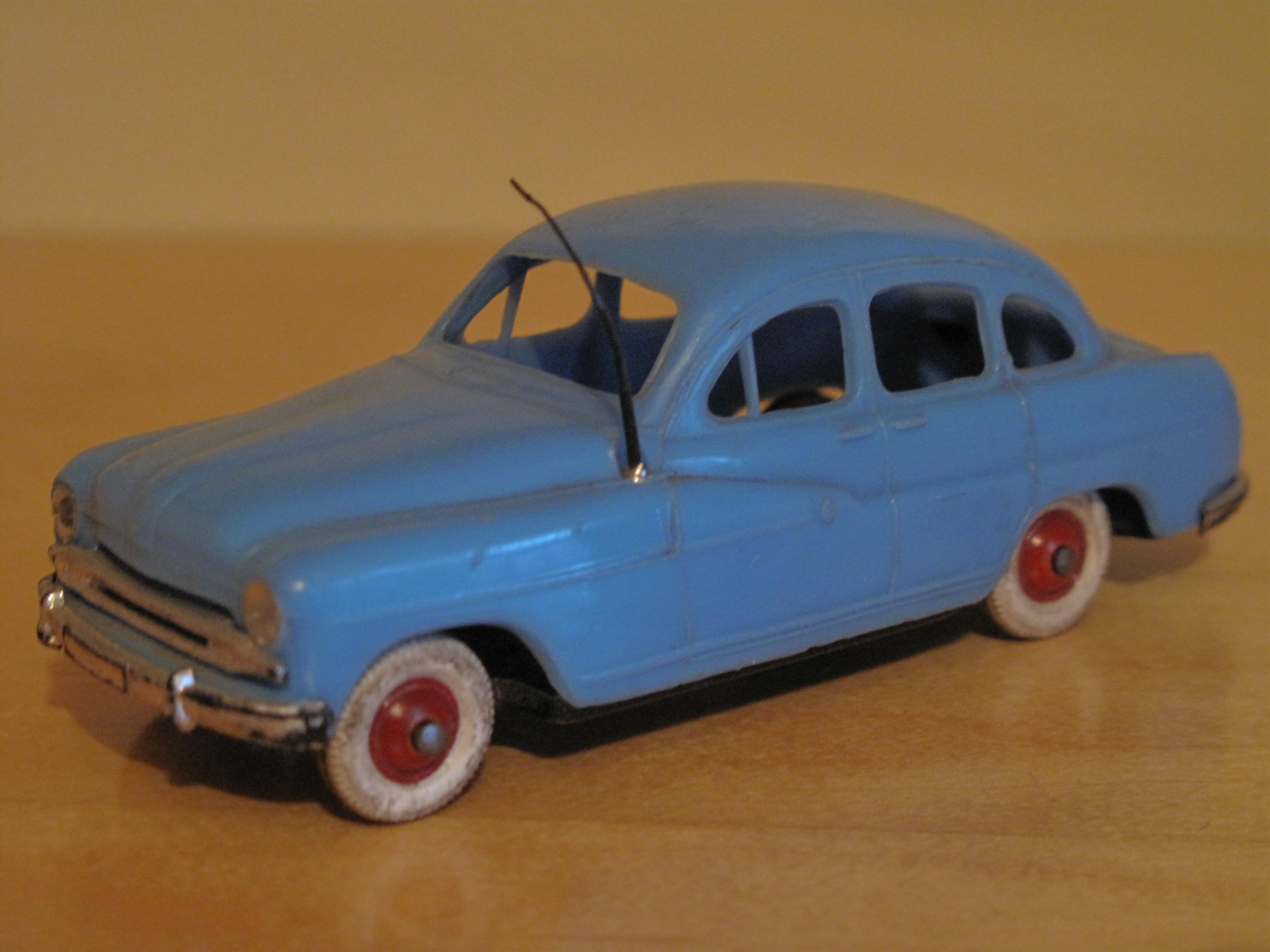
Model Ford Vedette from Norev

Most models did not have many accessories, unlike the competitors Minialuxe, but a few items like roof skis did occasionally appear, like on the Panhard Dyna. After about 1960, opening features began to appear on some – like the opening doors on the Renault 4 van or the Land Rover Expedition, which also featured a spare tire and roof luggage / equipment rack. By the end of the 1960s, models would feature multiple different opening parts. In the case of the Peugeot 504, released in 1969, the model featured 4 opening doors, as well as an opening hood and trunk. Also, different companies would often be advertised on the sides of the model trucks and vans, like Locatel telephone, Cibie lights, or Fleury Michon, a provider of meat products. The most common models for these promotional models were the Citroën 2CV Van and Type H, Renault Estafette and 4 Van, and the Peugeot J7.

Through the 1950s the red hubs were replaced with more detailed chrome ones and tires gradually became black (though some white tires were used until the late 1950s) and windows were added. In 1957, a 1:87 scale '500 / Micro-Norev' series appeared, mostly consisting of the same models that appeared in the 1:43 scale line. Still, some unique models, not issued in the 1:43 scale series, did appear, mainly the Renault Caravelle and the Peugeot 403 pick-up.

In 1961, Émile Véron of the Véron family started Majorette, a separate company, also in the Lyon area. This new smaller line of cars would be competition for Matchbox and Siku Toys.

== Going Diecast ==
Norev Jetcar 1:43 Porsche 924 Polizei from the 1970s. Rear hatch opens. Front silver turn signals and rear tail light lenses are hand painted.

The first diecast metal Norev models appeared about 1965. Later, the famous 'Jet-Car' series, appeared in 1971. These were hierarchically labeled the '600', '700', and '800' series, sequentially as discussed above, according to cost. The '600' line was cheaply made and production soon stopped. The HO scale line was discontinued, but in the late 1970s, Force says that 1:66 scale Schucos appeared as a Norev line (the Mini-Jet series). The Mini-Jets were lauded for good castings while criticized for cheap plastic interiors and poor packaging. Also, a Maxi-Jet line consisted mainly of trucks.

Norev's main competition in the 1960s and 1970s was Solido, though Norev's offerings and approach to the market was somewhat more toy oriented, while Solido appealed more to older collectors. For example, Norev wheel designs were often simple, compared to the very accurate designs of Solido. Norev wheels were particularly generic and toy-like during the 'Jet Car' era when manufacturers everywhere were mimicking Mattel's thin axle Hot Wheels. Even early on Norev cars had cost-saving plastic bases while many others manufacturers were still making bases in diecast metal. Nevertheless, Norev's cars were usually of excellent detail and proportion compared to real vehicles. One work that catalogs the extent and detail of Norev offerings was Le Monde Fantastique du Norev authored (in French) by Didier Beaujardin (2005).

== Packaging and Marketing ==
From the beginning, Norev used creative packaging and marketing. The early line glorified the benefits of plastic – early models came with an attached rectangular paper tag saying "Rhodialite, Light, Solid and Strong", in French, "Legerete, Solidite, Fidelite". The company used successful advertising ploys like supplying toy shops with paper bags displaying the Norev line. Norev boxes could be very intriguing (and sometimes rather fragile). For example the 1950s offerings came in cardboard boxes designed to mimic wooden packing crates with pictures of the cars on the sides.

Cars came with sweepstakes offers and much printed information. For example, the Jet-Car 800 series from 1974 had TWO sweepstakes offers. One was for the "Great Norev Game" ("Grand Jeu Norev") where one could collect the cartoon characters Norev, Jimmy, Tic, Costo, Comete, and Speed, color them and mail them back to the Norev 'Service Club' for prizes. Coloring had to be intricate though as the illustration of 'Tic' in the 1974 Renault 17 TS Coupe (no. 823) was only about two inches square. In the same package were coupons for the "Great Norev Rally" ("Grand Rallye de Norev"). Collect enough stamps, accumulating mileage in the rally, and you could win a Norev model car of your choice.

Though Norev models could be ultra detailed, their packaging colors and offers were often aimed at a younger clientele while Solido was more serious and rather stately in aiming its cars, more often showing them in clear plastic display cases, at collectors – without sweepstakes and games.

== LudOrev, France and China ==
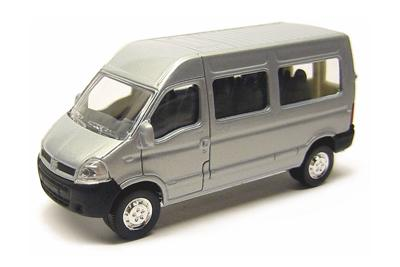
Renault Master Mini bus

Sometime around 1980, Norev either created or was taken over by LudOrev, which also issued other toys and doll playsets. Apart from the repeating of the last four letters "-orev", the origin of the name is unclear. Jet-Car packaging around the late 1980s said "LudOrev locataire gerente de Norev" ("tenant manager of Norev"). Possibly, the same old dies that were made and packaged in France were sold under the LudOrev name, distinguishing them from new offerings made in China.

In 1981 some of the earlier plastic models were reintroduced and then discontinued around 1984. Some of the lines were named "Plastigam" perhaps harking back to the plastic body days, but later the name was also used on diecast cars and their boxes.

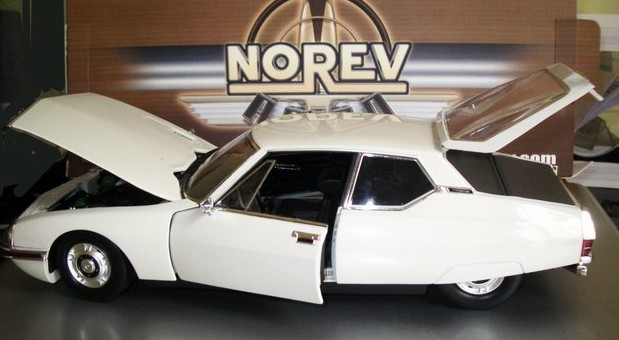
Citroën SM in 1:18 scale, made in China

Norev has moved upscale with new collectible vehicles aimed more at adults. With the new millennium, Norev has taken several new directions while keeping its heritage. In 2005, a line of Japanese brand cars was inaugurated in addition to its 1:18 scale series. This approach mirrors that of other companies like Solido, Corgi Toys, and Schuco Modell where 1:43 scale cars are priced in the $30 to $40 range, while 1:18 scale lines sell for $60 to $70. Again, most of these newer models are made in China.

In 2006, Norev celebrated its 60th anniversary, with the creation of a customised Chrysler 300 C with the help of tuning company Parotech.

== Company Directions ==
Norev around 2010 has exhibited a couple of main trends. One is the relegation of certain models either sold by, or made under, other brand names. For example, several former Norev castings were made and sold as Atlas Editions collectors models, especially their series of French presidential limousines like the Citroën SM Presidentielle. Whether the cars are made by Norev for Atlas Editions or the castings sold off to Atlas and other companies is uncertain.

Another trend, as seen on the official website, is that Norev has acquired or re-introduced several venerable old diecast brands, including the French CIJ name and Provence Moulage. In 2008, Norev also reintroduced the Spot-On brand once made by Tri-Ang in Northern Ireland. This was a bit odd since Spot-On did not at all have a French flavor in its offerings. Whereas CIJ focuses on trucks and industrial models and Norev on more everyday French cars with some racing versions, the angle of Provence Moulage seems to be on French historical and concept vehicles of more upscale model pricing. Also in 2008, under the auspices of CIJ, it was announced that the historic brand of JRD would also be launched, but as of 2011, no new JRD models seem to have been produced.

Thus Norev, more than the more global Solido, has remained a French entity traveling along a path reviving other lost French (and English) toy brands. Today, though much production has gone to China, the company is still headquartered near Villeurbanne, east of Lyon, in the municipality of Vaulx-en-Velin.

== Motorsport Sponsorship ==
Norev was the title sponsor of the privateer Formula 1 entry of BS Fabrications in the 1976 F1 championship, in partnership with Surtees. The team entered a Surtees TS19 in a partial season for Henri Pescarolo. This sponsorship was arranged by Charles James, at the time the managing director of the firm Inaltera, which was the constructor and sponsor of the Inaltera Le Mans team in 1976, in exchange for Pescarolo driving the Inaltera in 1976.

== Bibliography ==
- Beaujardin, Didier (2005). Le Monde Fantastique du Norev. Paris: Editions Grancher.
- Force, Edward (1991). Classic Miniature Vehicles Made in France. With price guide and variations list. West Chester PA: Schiffer Publishing. ISBN 0-88740-316-6.
- Gardiner, Gordon; O'Neill, Richard (1996). The Collector's Guide to Toy Cars: An International Survey of Tinplate and Diecast Cars from 1990. Random House. ISBN 978-0517159774.
- Johnson, Dana (1998). Collector's Guide to Diecast Toys and Scale Models (2nd ed.). Padukah KY: Collector Books.
- Ralston, Andrew; Forbes, Mike (2008). Plastic Toy Cars of the 1950s & 1960s. Veloce Publishing. ISBN 978-1-84584-125-6.
- Rixon, Peter (2005). Miller's Collecting Diecast Vehicles. London: Mitchell Beazley. ISBN 9781845330309.
