= Simba Dickie Group =

German toy manufacturer

- Type: Private GMBH
- Industry: Retail
- Founded: 1982; 44 years ago Fürth, Bavaria, Germany
- Founder: Fritz Sieber and Micheal Sieber
- Headquarters: Fürth, Bavaria
- Key people: Florian Sieber (CEO); Uwe Weiler (COO); Moritz Duschl (CFO)
- Products: Toys
- Net income: €711 million in 2024
- Number of employees: 2,600
- Website: www.simba-dickie-group.com

The Simba Dickie Group is a German toy manufacturer founded in 1982 as Simba Toys. It is the fourth largest toy manufacturer in Germany.

The company's headquarters are located in Fürth with operations in Lavans-lès-Saint-Claude and Hong Kong. Over 70% of its turnover is generated through foreign market sales. The Simba Dickie Group has subsidiaries in 30 countries worldwide and 8 production facilities. They also make Nintendo plush toys of the Super Mario franchise.

== History ==
The foundation stone for what would later become the Simba Dickie Group was laid in 1993 when the two companies Simba Toys and Dickie Toys merged.

Simba Toys was founded in 1982 by Fritz Sieber and his son Michael in Fuerth. Initially, the company primarily imported from the Far East.

Wolfgang Sauerborn had already founded the company, which was later renamed Dickie Toys, in 1971. This was taken over by Simba Toys after his death in 1993.

Over the years, more and more toy manufacturers and brands were acquired. Initially, only five people worked at Simba Toys. Today there are 2600 employees worldwide. The toy range comprises over 4,000 articles. In addition to Fürth, the company's headquarters are located in Langeais and Lavans-lès-Saint-Claude in France, Hong Kong, Doetinchem and California. In addition to production sites in various European and Asian countries, the Group has a global sales network.

Total turnover rose from 500 million euros in 2009 to 711.7 million euros in 2024.

== Companies and brands of the Simba-Dickie-Group ==
- Simba Toys: dolls, baby toys, children's household appliances and musical toys (e.g. Steffi Love, Madeleine and My Musik World).
- Dickie Toys (acquired in 1993): vehicles of all kinds. In addition to its own Carson brand, Dickie sells products under the Tamiya (since 1986) and Scalextric brands in Germany. The Tamiya-Carson brand includes distribution of radio-controlled vehicles and model aircraft as well as plastic model construction and car racing tracks.
- Eichhorn (acquired in 1998): wooden toys.
- Schuco (acquired in 1999): sheet metal vehicles and model vehicles mainly in the scales 1:90, 1:87 (H0), 1:43 and 1:32 (nominal size 1), mainly made of die-cast zinc.
- Noris-Spiele (acquired in 2001): board games. This also includes Schipper Art&Crafts (acquired in 2008), which produces painting by numbers; and Zoch (acquired in 2010), a German games publisher.
- BIG-Spielwarenfabrik (acquired in 2004): large plastic play equipment and outdoor play equipment (e.g. Bobby Car).
- Nicotoy (acquired in 2006): cuddly toys.
- Smoby Toys (founded in 2008): French toy manufacturer that previously owned Majorette and Solido.
- Majorette (acquired in 2010): toy cars.
- Solido (acquired in 2010): model cars.
- Heros (acquired in 2010): wooden toys.
- Märklin (acquired by Siso= Sieber&Sohn in 2013): model trains in I, H0 and Z sizes. This also includes LGB (garden railroad in nominal size IIm) and Trix (model railroads in the H0 and N nominal sizes).
- AquaPlay (acquired in 2014): water train systems.
- Undercover (majority stake acquired in 2015): products for the start of school.
- Zimpli Kids (2017 2/3 majority shareholding): British company, producing "Glibbi" bath additives for children.
- Corolle (acquired in 2018): traditional French dolls.
- Franz Carl Weber (acquired in 2018, 50% stake from 2019, sold in 2023): Swiss specialist toy retailer.
- Kid E Media (2018 majority stake): Swedish entertainment company Ruta Ett AB, which was renamed KID E MEDIA AB.
- Jada Toys (acquired in 2019): US manufacturer of toy cars and collectible figures.
- EXIT Toys (majority stake acquired in 2020): Dutch company for outdoor products.
- Scout (acquired in 2024): brand name for school bags.
