= Simba, Gauteng =

Simba
- Location within Gauteng Location within South Africa
- Coordinates: 26.100°S 28.070°E
- Country: South Africa
- Province: Gauteng
- Municipality: City of Johannesburg
- Main Place: Sandton

Area
  - Total: 0.08 km^{2} (0.031 sq mi)

Population (2011)
  - Total: 231
  - Density: 2,900/km^{2} (7,500/sq mi)

Racial makeup (2011)
  - Black African: 65.9%
  - Coloured: 10.3%
  - Indian/Asian: 3.9%
  - White: 16.4%
  - Other: 3.4%

First languages (2011)
  - English: 70.6%
  - Northern Sotho: 7.8%
  - Southern Ndebele: 3.9%
  - Sotho: 3.9%
  - Other: 13.7%
- Time zone: UTC+2 (SAST)
- Postal code (street): 2196
- PO box: 2031

Simba is a suburb of Johannesburg, South Africa. It is located in Region E of the City of Johannesburg Metropolitan Municipality.
