= Simba Chips =

Potato crisp company

- Product type: Potato crisps
- Current owner: PepsiCo (1995)
- Country: South Africa
- Introduced: 1957; 69 years ago
- Related brands: Ouma Rusks; NikNaks; Ghost Pops; Doritos; Lay's
- Markets: Southern Africa
- Previous owners: Greyvenstyn Family (1957); Fedfood (1977); Foodcorp (1992)
- Tagline: Roars with flavour
- Website: Brand Website

Simba Chips (commonly referred to simply as Simba) is a popular South African brand of potato crisps. It was first introduced in 1957 by the Greyvensteyn family. "Simba" is the Swahili word for "lion" and the product's mascot is an adult male African Lion.

== History ==
Having successfully marketed Ouma Rusks in the 1940s and 1950s, the Greyvensteyn family were looking for ways to diversify their family business. In 1955, Leon Greyvensteyn travelled to a food fair in Germany in search of ideas. It was there that he met a man called Herman Lay – the co-founder of Frito-Lay, the largest chip company in the world. The two men struck up a friendship, and Leon travelled on to the United States where he saw a potato chip factory in action.
