= NikNaks (South African snack) =

South African snack brand

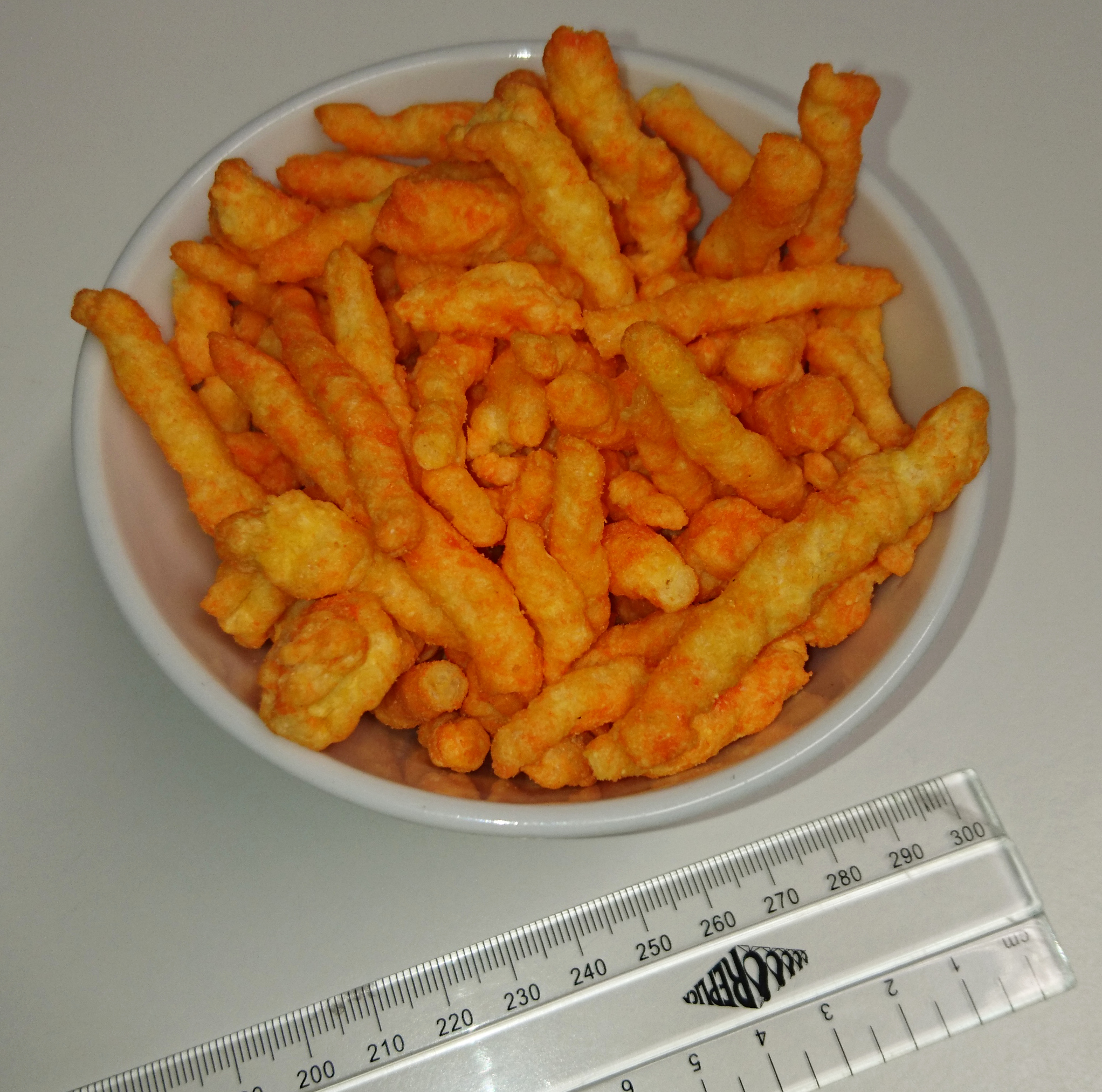
- A bowl of NikNaks
- Product type: Cheese puffs
- Current owner: Simba Chips
- Country: South Africa
- Introduced: 1972
- Discontinued: Never
- Related brands: Simba Chips
- Markets: Southern Africa
- Website: Official website

NikNaks, also known as "amaNikNaks," is the brand name for a popular brand of South African Cheese puffs manufactured by the Simba Chips company since 1972. Originally only coming in a "Cheese" flavour. It is normally sold in 55 gram and 135 gram bags, and is primarily made from maize, vegetable oil, salt and cheese.

Though based in South Africa and mostly consumed in the Southern African region, NikNaks are consumed internationally due to South Africa's diaspora.

== Branding ==
A selection of three NikNaks packets from 1972 to 2010 that illustrate the change in design of the brand's mascot 'Nik the Naks' over time. With the original NikNaks packet on the left showing the original Kaapse Klopse minstrel design (Cheese flavour), the design used in the 2000s in the middle (Cheese flavour), and the final design adopted in 2010 on the right (Fruit Chutney flavour).

The brand features the brand mascot, Nik the Nak, on a yellow packet with different coloured diamonds arranged in a circular pattern depending on the flavour. Green for fruit chutney, brown for spicy beef, and pink for cheese. In the 2000s the image of the brand mascot was altered due to concerns over the racially prejudicial nature of the original image featuring a stylised Kaapse Klopse minstrel. The mascot was originally "introduced as a middle-aged comic-like character [that] has since evolved into a funkier more youthful male, symbolising elements of youth culture."

The new and final (as of 2020) branding was finalised in 2010 when a design from the advertising agency Graffiti by Mzwandile Buthelezi was chosen after members of the public voted it the best of 3 possible new options.

In 2014 British importers of South African Niknaks were issued with legal letters informing them not to import the snacks into the country as they infringed on the brand name of the older, 1981-established British brand Nik Naks manufactured by KP Snacks.

== Flavours ==
NikNaks currently come in eight different flavours:

- Original Cheese – the brand's original flavour in a yellow and pink packet.
- BBQ flavour – (formerly Spicy Beef) launched on the brand's 40th anniversary in October 2013 in a yellow and brown packet.
- Fruit Chutney – in a yellow and green packet.
- Grilled Chicken – in a yellow and tan packet (launched 2020).
- Sweet Chili – in a yellow and blue packet.
- Ama-Collision Cheese & Sweet Chilli – in a yellow, pink and blue packet.
- Ama-Collision Cheese & BBQ – in a yellow, pink and brown packet.
- Flamin' Hot – Black and Red packet

The following flavours are discontinued:

- Chilli Cheese – in a yellow and red packet launched in November 2015.
- Spicy Tomato – in a yellow and red packet launched in 2010.

== Controversy ==
Simba Chip, the manufacturers of NikNaks, were reviewed by South Africa's Advertising Regulatory Body for alleged false advertising after public complaints that the Flamin' Hot flavour was not spicy. The board ruled in Simba's favour, stating that perceived spiciness is subjective to each consumer.

== Nutritional information ==
	Cheese Flavour		Spicy Beef		Fruit Chutney Flavour	
Average Values	Per 100g	Per Bag	Per 100g	Per Bag	Per 100g	Per Bag
Energy (kJ)	2335	1284	2375	1284	2335	1284
Energy (kCal)	564	307	564	307	559	307
Protein	6.2g	2.5g	6.2g	2.5g	6.2g	2.5g
Carbohydrate	53g	29g	53g	29g	53g	29g
of which Sugars	1.3g	0.7g	1.3g	0.7g	1.3g	0.7g
Fat	36g	17.9g	36g	17.9g	36g	17.9g
Sodium	0.839g	0.461g	0.8g	0.461g	0.992g	0.461g
