= Deaths in November 2013 =

The following is a list of notable deaths in November 2013.

Entries for each day are listed alphabetically by surname. A typical entry lists information in the following sequence:

- Name, age, country of citizenship and reason for notability, established cause of death, reference.

== November 2013 ==
=== 1 ===
- François Bovon, 75, Swiss biblical scholar and historian.
- Albert Chaumarat, 86, French cyclist.
- Harlan's Holiday, 14, American Thoroughbred racehorse, euthanized.
- Tato Laviera, 63, American Nuyorican poet, diabetes.
- Hermann Levinson, 89, German biologist and physiologist.
- Liminha, 69, Brazilian footballer and manager, infection.
- Lawrence Marcus, 96, American-Jewish businessperson.
- John Mazur, 83, American football player and coach.
- John Y. McCollister, 92, American politician, member of the House of Representatives from Nebraska (1971–1977), cancer.
- Hakimullah Mehsud, 34, Pakistani Taliban leader, drone strike.
- Mario Ojeda Gómez, 86, Mexican scholar and diplomat.
- Paul Dennis Reid, 55, American convicted murderer, complications from pneumonia and heart failure.
- Eugène Rhéaume, 80, Canadian politician, MP for the Northwest Territories (1963–1965).
- Piet Rietveld, 61, Dutch economist.
- Editta Sherman, 101, American photographer.

=== 2 ===
- Jack Alexander, 77, Scottish entertainer and comedian, stroke.
- Bill Beall, 91, American football coach (LSU Tigers).
- Walt Bellamy, 74, American Hall of Fame basketball player, Olympic gold medalist (1960).
- Vasco Giuseppe Bertelli, 89, Italian Roman Catholic prelate, Bishop of Volterra (1985–2000).
- Brita Borge, 82, Norwegian politician.
- Robert R. Bowie, 104, American diplomat and academic.
- Eugene Callender, 87, American pastor and activist.
- Zlatko Crnković, 82, Croatian literary translator.
- Ghislaine Dupont, 57, French journalist, shot.
- Joop Eversteijn, 92, Dutch footballer (ADO Den Haag).
- Josef Ezr, 90, Czech Olympic basketballer.
- Målfrid Grude Flekkøy, 78, Norwegian psychologist and children's ombudsman.
- Hugh Gurling, 63, English geneticist, heart attack.
- Montgomery Kaluhiokalani, 54, American surfer, lung cancer.
- Beatrice Kemmerer, 83, American AAGPBL baseball player.
- Mitsuo Komatsubara, 95, Japanese professional golfer, heart failure.
- Bill Lawrence, 82, German-born American electric guitar designer and maker.
- Clifford Nass, 55, American academic and author (The Media Equation), heart attack.
- Kjell Qvale, 94, Norwegian-born American businessman (Jensen Motors).
- Milanko Renovica, 85, Yugoslav politician, President of the Executive Council of SR Bosnia and Herzegovina (1974–1982); President of the Presidency (1984–1985).
- Russ Sullivan, 90, American baseball player (Detroit Tigers).
- Alfred Umgeher, 87, Austrian sprint canoer.

=== 3 ===
- D. Rajendra Babu, 62, Indian film director and screenwriter, heart attack.
- Lambert Bartak, 94, American stadium organist.
- Rifkat Bogdanov, 63, Russian mathematician.
- Nick Cardy, 93, American comic book artist (Aquaman, Teen Titans, Superman), heart failure.
- Gerard Cieślik, 86, Polish footballer (Ruch Chorzów).
- Gamani Corea, 87, Sri Lankan diplomat and civil servant, Secretary-General of the United Nations Conference on Trade and Development (1974–1984).
- William J. Coyne, 77, American politician, member of the House of Representatives from Pennsylvania (1981–2003).
- Philip Fang, 72, Hong Kong simultaneous interpreter, chief of the United Nations Chinese interpretation section, suicide by jumping.
- Geza Gallos, 65, Austrian footballer (SK Rapid Wien).
- Rupert Gerritsen, 60, Australian historian.
- Ryszard Kraus, 49, Polish footballer (Górnik Zabrze, GKS Tychy).
- Andro Linklater, 68, Scottish writer and historian, heart attack.
- Leonard Long, 102, Australian landscape painter.
- Brian Manning, 81, Australian trade unionist and political activist.
- Austin John Marshall, 76, English record producer and artist.
- Vladimir Musalimov, 69, Ukrainian Soviet Olympic boxer (1968).
- William Pollack, 87, British-born American immunologist, developed the Rho(D) immune globulin vaccine for Rh disease, complications from diabetes and heart disease.
- Reshma, c. 66, Pakistani folk singer, throat cancer.
- Bernard Roberts, 80, English pianist.
- Joyce Rose, 84, British magistrate and politician.
- Trần Văn Quang, 96, Vietnamese army colonel general.
- Agim Zajmi, 76, Albanian painter.

=== 4 ===
- Hakon Barfod, 87, Norwegian Olympic sailor (1948, 1952).
- Roger Barton, 67, English footballer.
- Suzanne M. Bianchi, 61, American sociologist, pancreatic cancer.
- Hans von Borsody, 84, Austrian-born German actor.
- Viktor Dolnik, 75, Russian ornithologist.
- Lois Graham, 88, American professor of thermodynamics and cryogenics.
- John D. Hawk, 89, American World War II veteran, Medal of Honor recipient.
- Betty Hill, 76, Canadian politician, diabetes.
- Reinaldo Leandro Mora, 93, Venezuelan educator and politician.
- Jane Cleo Marshall Lucas, 92–93, first African American female to pass the Maryland bar exam.
- Leon Miękina, 83, Polish writer.
- Eleanor Mlotek, 91, American musicologist.
- Elfed Morris, 71, Welsh footballer (Chester City).
- Mohan Rai, 80, Indian cricketer.
- John Steele, 86, British oceanographer.
- Leonid Stolovich, 84, Russian-born Estonian philosopher.
- Georg Wahl, 93, German dressage instructor, rider and trainer.
- Ray Willsey, 85, Canadian-born American football player and coach.

=== 5 ===
- Habibollah Asgaroladi, 81, Iranian politician and presidential candidate, Leader of Islamic Coalition Party (1998–2008), lung problems.
- Juan Carlos Calabró, 79, Argentine actor (Johny Tolengo, el majestuoso), kidney disease.
- Dino Gifford, 96, Italian footballer.
- Ian Irvine, 84, New Zealand rugby union player (North Auckland, national team).
- Tony Iveson, 94, British Royal Air Force pilot and World War II veteran.
- Lounis Matem, 72, Algerian footballer (ES Sétif, CR Belouizdad).
- Charles Mosley, 65, British genealogist, cancer.
- Carl Ogden, 84, American insurance company executive and politician.
- Daniel Orts, 89, French cyclist.
- Ed Pincus, 75, American documentary filmmaker.
- Georges Ramoulux, 93, French cyclist.
- William B. Spofford, 92, American bishop.
- Juan Manuel Tenuta, 89, Uruguayan actor, stroke.
- Bobby Thomason, 85, American football player (Philadelphia Eagles), heart failure.
- Charlie Trotter, 54, American chef and restaurateur, stroke.
- Stuart Williams, 83, Welsh international footballer.

=== 6 ===
- Þórdís Árnadóttir, 80, Icelandic Olympic swimmer.
- Guillermina Bravo, 92, Mexican ballet dancer and choreographer.
- Tarla Dalal, 77, Indian food writer and chef, cardiac arrest.
- Jorge Dória, 92, Brazilian actor and humorist, cardiorespiratory failure.
- Elton Engstrom Jr., 78, American politician, member of the Alaska House of Representatives (1965–1967) and Senate (1967–1971).
- Peter Fatialofa, 54, Samoan rugby union player and coach, heart attack.
- Yosef Harish, 90, Israeli jurist, Attorney General (1986–1993).
- Arvid Johanson, 84, Norwegian politician and newspaper editor, Minister of Petroleum and Energy (1980–1981).
- Christian López, 29, Guatemalan Olympic weightlifter (2008, 2012), ARDS.
- Dan Lurie, 90, American bodybuilder and fitness pioneer.
- Ian Roy MacLennan, 94, Canadian fighter pilot and flying ace.
- Vikram Marwah, 88, Indian orthopedic surgeon.
- Ace Parker, 101, American football (Brooklyn Dodgers) and baseball player Philadelphia Athletics, member of the Pro Football Hall of Fame.
- Cheb i Sabbah, 66, Algerian musician and composer, stomach cancer.
- Clyde Stacy, 77, American musician, co-creator of the Tulsa Sound, traffic collision.
- Sammy Taylor, 80, Scottish footballer.
- Roberto Zárate, 80, Argentine footballer

=== 7 ===
- John Cole, 85, British broadcaster and journalist, BBC political editor (1981–1992).
- Adolfo Constenla Umaña, 65, Costa Rican philologist and linguist, cancer.
- Ian Davies, 57, Australian Olympic basketball player (1980, 1984), Australian Basketball Hall of Fame inductee (2001).
- Ron Dellow, 99, English football player and manager.
- C. R. De Silva, 65, Sri Lankan lawyer, Attorney General (2007–2008), Solicitor General (2000–2007).
- Mary Eyre, 89, British hockey and tennis player.
- Nikolai Karpov, 83, Russian Olympic ice hockey player (1960).
- Joey Manley, 48, American website publisher (Modern Tales), pneumonia.
- Paul Mantee, 82, American actor (Apollo 13, Cagney & Lacey, Robinson Crusoe on Mars).
- Jack Mitchell, 88, American photographer and author.
- Nam Tae-hi, 84, South Korean martial artist, pioneering master of taekwondo.
- Joseph Rhodes Jr., 66, American politician and activist, member of the Pennsylvania House of Representatives (1973–1980).
- Amparo Rivelles, 88, Spanish actress.
- Manfred Rommel, 84, German politician, Lord Mayor of Stuttgart (1974–1996).
- Charlotte Streifer Rubinstein, 91, American teacher of art and art history.
- Lenny Rzeszewski, 90, American college basketball player.
- Sanford Yung, 86, Hong Kong accountant, politician and racehorse owner.

=== 8 ===
- AVS, 56, Indian actor, liver failure.
- Chitti Babu, 49, Indian comedian and actor, brain tumour.
- John Bell Jr., 76, American artist, stomach cancer.
- Michael Glyn Brown, 56, American hand surgeon, cardiac arrest.
- William C. Davidon, 86, American scientist and peace activist.
- Marianne Edwards, 82, American child actress.
- Kris Ife, 67, English pop singer, heart attack.
- Penn Kimball, 98, American journalist and college professor (Columbia University).
- Carl Lovsted, 83, American Olympic rower (1952).
- Maxie McFarland, American soldier.
- Rod Miller, 73, American baseball player (Brooklyn Dodgers).
- Esko Niemi, 79, Finnish ice hockey player.
- Lică Nunweiller, 74, Romanian footballer (Dinamo).
- Arnold Rosner, 68, American classical music composer.
- Harry Sawyerr, 87, Ghanaian politician and quantity surveyor.
- Chiyoko Shimakura, 75, Japanese singer and actress, liver cancer.
- Sir John Whitehead, 81, British diplomat, Ambassador to Japan (1986–1992).

=== 9 ===
- Savaş Ay, 59, Turkish journalist, throat cancer.
- John Dendahl, 75, American politician and Olympic skier (1960).
- Helen Eadie, 66, Scottish politician, MSP for Dunfermline East (1999–2011); Cowdenbeath (since 2011), cancer.
- Grethe Rytter Hasle, 93, Norwegian biologist.
- Peter Krummeck, 66, South African actor and playwright, cancer.
- Kalaparusha Maurice McIntyre, 77, American jazz saxophonist.
- Steve Prescott, 39, English rugby league player, stomach cancer.
- Vasile Suciu, 71, Romanian footballer, lung cancer.
- Emile Zuckerkandl, 91, Austrian-born American biologist.

=== 10 ===
- Kirpal Singh Bhardwaj, 78, Kenyan Olympic hockey player.
- Dragomir Čumić, 76, Serbian actor.
- Vijaydan Detha, 87, Indian folk writer, cardiac arrest.
- John Grant, 91, Australian neurosurgeon and disability sport administrator.
- Richard Grathoff, 79, German phenomenologist.
- Carl Hilliard, 76, American journalist, reporter and columnist (The Associated Press), heart attack.
- Richie Jean Jackson, 81, American author, teacher, and civil rights activist.
- Jiang Zejia, 92–93, Chinese electrical engineer and educator.
- John Matchefts, 82, American Olympic ice hockey player.
- Sir Humphrey Maud, 79, British diplomat.
- Michael A. Miles, 74, American business executive (Kraft Foods, Philip Morris).
- Giorgio Orelli, 92, Swiss poet.
- Tommy Quick, 58, Swedish Olympic archer.
- Safdar Rahmat Abadi, Iranian government official, deputy industry minister, shot.
- James Harlan Steele, 100, American veterinarian.
- Pushpa Thangadurai, 82, Indian Tamil language author.

=== 11 ===
- Dayananda Bajracharya, 69, Nepalese academic.
- John Barnhill, 75, American basketball player and coach.
- Domenico Bartolucci, 96, Italian Roman Catholic cardinal, Deacon of the Gesù e Maria church in Rome.
- Anne Barton, 80, British Shakespearean scholar.
- Bob Beckham, 86, American music publisher and country singer.
- John S. Dunne, 83, American priest and theologian, complications from a head injury.
- William Fyfe, 86, New Zealand geologist.
- Stein Grieg Halvorsen, 104, Norwegian theater actor.
- Atilla Karaosmanoğlu, 81, Turkish economist and politician, Deputy Prime Minister (1971), respiratory failure.
- Henry Curtis Lind, 92, American lawyer.
- Diego Llopis, 84, Spanish footballer.
- Eddie McGrady, 78, Northern Irish politician, MP for South Down (1987–2010).
- Shirley Mitchell, 94, American actress (The Red Skelton Show, Perry Mason, I Love Lucy), heart failure.
- Jerome Murphy-O'Connor, 78, Irish biblical scholar.
- George Reinholt, 73, American actor (Another World, One Life to Live).
- István Telegdy, 85, Hungarian Olympic sailor (1960).
- Morton Yolkut, 70, American rabbi.

=== 12 ===
- Mavis Batey, 92, British World War II codebreaker.
- Allan Blank, 87, American composer, brain tumor.
- Hetty Bower, 108, British political activist.
- Raymond S. Burton, 74, American politician, Executive Councillor for New Hampshire District 1 (1977–1979, since 1981), kidney cancer.
- Giuseppe Casari, 91, Italian Olympic footballer (Atalanta Bergamo, Napoli).
- Geo Costiniu, 63, Romanian actor, adenocarcinoma.
- Zoltan Czaka, 80, Romanian Olympic ice hockey player.
- Erik Dyreborg, 73, Danish footballer.
- Katherine Hagedorn, 52, American musicologist.
- Luis Ibarra, 76, Chilean footballer and manager.
- Festus Iyayi, 66, Nigerian writer and academic, traffic collision.
- Mavis Kelsey, 101, American physician.
- John McCormick, 76, American football player (Minnesota Vikings, Denver Broncos).
- Sehadete Mekuli, 85, Kosovar gynecologist and academic.
- Steve Rexe, 66, Canadian Olympic bronze medallist ice hockey player (1968).
- Manuel Ray Rivero, 88–89, Cuban engineer and political activist.
- Konrad Rudnicki, 87, Polish astronomer.
- Al Ruscio, 89, American actor (The Godfather Part III, Showgirls).
- Aleksandr Serebrov, 69, Soviet cosmonaut.
- Dumitru Sigmirean, 54, Romanian footballer, lung cancer.
- Péter Szőr, 43, Hungarian information security specialist.
- Sir John Tavener, 69, British composer (Children of Men), complications from Marfan syndrome.
- Kurt Trampedach, 70, Danish painter and sculptor, cardiac arrest.
- Antigoni Valakou, 83, Greek theatre actress.
- William Weaver, 90, American translator of modern Italian literature.

=== 13 ===
- Chieko Aioi, 78, Japanese actress and voice actress, heart failure.
- Onesimo Cadiz Gordoncillo, 78, Filipino Roman Catholic prelate, Bishop of Tagbilaran (1976–1986) and Archbishop of Capiz (1986–2011).
- José Cantón, 76, Spanish footballer.
- Todd Christensen, 57, American football player (Los Angeles Raiders), complications during liver transplant surgery.
- Thierry Gerbier, 48, French Olympic biathlete.
- Kevin Gilroy, 77, American Air Force colonel and mayor of Gilroy (1997-1999).
- Eugène Hanck, 85, Luxembourgish Olympic sprint canoer (1952).
- Hans-Jürgen Heise, 83, German author and poet.
- Barbara Lawrence, 83, American actress (Oklahoma!) and businesswoman.
- Claudette Masdammer, 74, Guyanese Olympic sprinter.
- Nikolaos Martis, 98, Greek politician and minister.
- Mauro Nesti, 78, Italian racecar driver, eight-time European Hill Climb champion.
- Roland Paoletti, 82, British architect.
- Pierre Scribante, 82, French cyclist.
- Daniel J. Shanefield, 83, American ceramic engineer.
- Robert Vito, American television correspondent and bureau chief (CNN), pancreatic cancer.

=== 14 ===
- Georgina Anderson, 15, English singer, liver cancer.
- Augustine, 58, Indian actor, renal failure.
- Sudhir Bhat, 61–62, Indian theatre producer, heart attack.
- Mike Cappelletti, 71, American bridge and poker player, and author.
- Piet de Wolf, 91, Dutch football manager.
- Hari Krishna Devsare, 75, Indian author of children's literature and magazine editor (Parag).
- Dena Epstein, 96, American music librarian and author.
- Barbara Handman, 85, American political consultant and Broadway theatre preservationist, complications from Alzheimer's disease.
- Ramziya al-Iryani, 58–59, Yemeni novelist, writer, diplomat and feminist.
- Bennett Masinga, 48, South African footballer.
- Jim McCluskey, 63, Scottish football referee.
- Olivia Robertson, 96, British religious leader, high priestess of the Fellowship of Isis.
- Reg Sinclair, 88, Canadian ice hockey player (New York Rangers, Detroit Red Wings).

=== 15 ===
- Sheila Matthews Allen, 84, American actress (The Towering Inferno, The Poseidon Adventure), pulmonary fibrosis.
- Karla Álvarez, 41, Mexican actress (Qué Bonito Amor), respiratory failure.
- Kurt Caselli, 30, American motocross rider, race collision.
- Glafcos Clerides, 94, Cypriot politician, President (1974, 1993–2003).
- Keith Cumberpatch, 86, New Zealand field hockey player.
- Raimondo D'Inzeo, 88, Italian Olympic show jumping rider.
- Félix Geybels, 77, Belgian international footballer (Beringen, national team).
- T. J. Jemison, 95, American Christian leader, president of the National Baptist Convention, USA, Inc. (1982–1994).
- Mickey Knox, 91, American actor and screenwriter (The Good, the Bad and the Ugly, G.I. Blues).
- Heinz Lorenz, 97, Czechoslovak Olympic athlete.
- Kripalu Maharaj, 91, Indian Hindu spiritual leader.
- Mike McCormack, 83, American Hall of Fame football player (Cleveland Browns) and coach.
- Barbara Park, 66, American author of children's books (Junie B. Jones), ovarian cancer.
- Andrew Semple, 101, British medical officer.
- Walt Witcover, 89, American actor and acting teacher.

=== 16 ===
- Chris Argyris, 90, American business theorist.
- Robert Conley, 85, American journalist and radio host (All Things Considered), parotid cancer.
- Billy Hardwick, 72, American ten-pin bowler, heart attack.
- Zbyněk Hejda, 83, Czech poet and historian, recipient of the Jaroslav Seifert Prize (1996).
- William McDonough Kelly, 88, Canadian politician, Senator (1982–2000).
- Tanvir Ahmad Khan, 81, Pakistani public servant and diplomat, Foreign Secretary (1989–1990).
- Hilary Laing, 86, British Olympic skier.
- Oscar Lanford, 73, American mathematician.
- Erik Loe, 93, Norwegian journalist and editor.
- Ian MacPherson, 73–74, Canadian historian.
- Johnny Martin, 66, English footballer (Colchester United, Workington, Southport).
- Arne Pedersen, 82, Norwegian footballer (Fredrikstad, national team).
- Robin Plunket, 8th Baron Plunket, 87, British peer.
- Louis D. Rubin Jr., 89, American writer and publisher.
- William Ward, 4th Earl of Dudley, 93, British peer.
- Charles Waterhouse, 89, American artist.
- Jock Young, 71, British criminologist, anaplastic thyroid cancer.

=== 17 ===
- Zeke Bella, 83, American baseball player (New York Yankees, Kansas City Athletics), complications from stroke and fall.
- Sir Alfred Blake, 98, British Royal Marines officer and solicitor, Director of the Duke of Edinburgh's Award Scheme (1967–1978).
- Frank Chamberlin, 35, American football player (Tennessee Titans), brain cancer.
- Joe Dean, 83, American Collegiate Hall of Fame basketball player (2012), LSU athletic director (1987–2000).
- Syd Field, 77, American screenwriting guru, hemolytic anemia.
- Herbert Gordon, 61, Jamaican footballer, complications from diabetes.
- Doris Lessing, 94, British novelist (The Grass Is Singing, The Golden Notebook, The Good Terrorist), poet, playwright and librettist, laureate of Nobel Prize in Literature (2007).
- Antonio J. Marino, 92, American politician, Mayor of Lynn, Massachusetts (1972–1973, 1976–1985).
- Nicholas Mevoli, 32, American deep water diver, pulmonary edema.
- Gerald Spring Rice, 6th Baron Monteagle of Brandon, 87, British peer and businessman.
- George Thuo, 46, Kenyan politician, member of the National Assembly for Juja Constituency (2007–2010).
- Om Prakash Valmiki, 63, Indian writer, liver cancer.
- Mary Nesbitt Wisham, 88, American baseball player.

=== 18 ===
- Bob Bentley, 84, Canadian politician, consequences of a vehicle accident.
- Peter Cartwright, 78, South African-born British actor.
- Forrest Claunch, 73, American politician, pancreatic cancer.
- Thomas Howard, 30, American football player (Oakland Raiders), traffic collision.
- Sir Jock Kennedy, 85, British air marshal.
- Helen Norris, 97, American novelist and short story author.
- Bennett Reimer, 81, American music professor.
- Nejat Uygur, 86, Turkish comedian.
- S. R. D. Vaidyanathan, 84, Indian musician.
- Ljubomir Vračarević, 66, Serbian martial artist, founder of Real Aikido.
- Peter Wintonick, 60, Canadian documentary filmmaker, cholangiocarcinoma.

=== 19 ===
- Babe Birrer, 85, American baseball player (Detroit Tigers, Baltimore Orioles, Los Angeles Dodgers).
- Marc Breaux, 89, American choreographer (The Sound of Music, Mary Poppins).
- Nan Campbell, 87, American politician, first female Mayor of Bellevue, Washington (1988–1989), pneumonia.
- Taisia Chenchik, 77, Ukrainian Soviet Olympic bronze medalist (1964) and European champion athlete (1966).
- Gunter Christmann, 77, German-born Australian painter.
- Dora Dougherty Strother, 91, American test pilot and engineer.
- André Filippini, 89, Swiss businessman and Olympic bronze medalist bobsledder (1952).
- Ray Gosling, 74, British broadcaster and gay rights activist.
- John Ingamells, 79, British art historian.
- Bob Kiley, 80, American ice-hockey player.
- Joseph Frans Lescrauwaet, 90, Dutch Roman Catholic prelate, Auxiliary Bishop of Haarlem (1983–1995).
- Diane Disney Miller, 79, American philanthropist, complications from a fall.
- Matthias N'Gartéri Mayadi, 71, Chadian Roman Catholic prelate, Archbishop of N'Djaména (since 2003).
- Jacquelyn K. O'Brien, 82, American politician.
- Frederick Sanger, 95, British biochemist, laureate of Nobel Prize in Chemistry (1958, 1980).
- Antoni Tomiczek, 98, Polish World War II pilot.
- Charlotte Zolotow, 98, American author and poet.

=== 20 ===
- Bruce Bilby, 91, British mechanical engineer.
- Pavel Bobek, 76, Czech singer.
- Sylvia Browne, 77, American author and self-proclaimed psychic.
- Yevgeny Cherkasov, 83, Russian Olympic sport shooter.
- Joseph Paul Franklin, 63, American serial killer, executed by lethal injection.
- Dan Gerrity, 59, American news director (KSFR) and actor (The Spirit, Swing Vote), heart attack.
- Peter Griffiths, 85, British politician, MP for Smethwick (1964–1966) and Portsmouth North (1979–1997).
- Gardner Hathaway, 88, American CIA officer.
- José Hernández, 69, Spanish painter and engraver.
- Dieter Hildebrandt, 86, German kabarettist, cancer.
- Austin Ikin, 83, South African Olympic rower.
- Rafiqul Islam, 63, Bangladeshi-born Canadian language activist, leukaemia.
- Frank Lauterbur, 88, American football head coach (University of Toledo, University of Iowa), dementia and Parkinson's disease.
- Beth MacKenzie, 53, Canadian nurse and politician.
- Oleg Minko, 75, Ukrainian painter.
- Sokol Olldashi, 40, Albanian politician, MP (since 2001), Minister of Public Works, Transportation and Telecommunications, traffic collision.
- Klaus Praefcke, 80, German chemist.
- Franco Selleri, 77, Italian theoretical physicist.
- Justus Smith, 91, American rower, Olympic champion (1948).
- Raymond P. Spillenger, 89, American painter.
- Sir Cyril Townsend, 75, British politician, MP for Bexleyheath (1974–1997).
- Émile Véron, 88, French entrepreneur (Majorette), co-creator of Norev model cars.
- Juan José Wedel, 69, Costa Rican Olympic archer.
- Hellmuth Wolff, 76, Swiss-born Canadian organ builder.

=== 21 ===
- Jindřich Balcar, 63, Czech Olympic ski jumper (1976).
- Ronny Coaches, Ghanaian musician (Buk Bak), heart attack.
- James Cumes, 91, Australian author and economist.
- John Egerton, 78, American journalist and author, heart attack.
- Peter Frank, 79, British political scientist.
- Theo Gerdener, 97, South African politician, Interior Minister (1970–1972), leader of the Democratic Party (1973–1977).
- Ahmad Jan, Afghan politician.
- Fred Kavli, 86, Norwegian businessman, founded Kavlico Corporation.
- Dimitri Mihalas, 74, American astrophysicist.
- Vern Mikkelsen, 85, American Hall of Fame basketball player (Minneapolis Lakers).
- Herbert Mitgang, 93, American author, editor, journalist, playwright and producer.
- Mike Palagyi, 96, American baseball player (Washington Senators).
- Bernard Parmegiani, 86, French composer.
- Cyril Perkins, 102, English cricketer.
- Vadde Ramesh, 66, Indian film producer, cancer.
- Elfriede Spiegelhauer-Uhlig, 79, German Olympic cross-country skier.
- Tony Summers, 89, British Olympic swimmer (1948).
- Conrad Susa, 78, American opera composer (Transformations).
- Tôn Thất Đính, 87, Vietnamese army lieutenant general.
- Maurice Vachon, 84, Canadian professional wrestler.
- Michael Weiner, 51, American labor leader and lawyer, executive director of the MLBPA, brain tumor.
- George Werley, 75, American baseball player (Baltimore Orioles).

=== 22 ===
- Wanda Coleman, 67, American poet and screenwriter.
- Mircea Crișan, 89, Romanian comedian and comedic actor.
- Don Dailey, 57, American computer programmer, leukemia.
- Brian Dawson, 74, British folk singer and song collector.
- Abelardo Estorino, 88, Cuban dramatist, director, and theater critic.
- Tom Gilmartin, 78, Irish businessman, Mahon Tribunal witness.
- Jancarlos, 30, Brazilian footballer, traffic collision.
- Pierre Jacques Joatton, 83, French Roman Catholic prelate, Bishop of Saint-Étienne (1988−2006).
- Aleksandr Komarov, 90, Russian world champion ice hockey player (1954).
- Georges Lautner, 87, French film director and screenwriter.
- Paul Mayer, 82, German–born American Catholic priest and peace activist.
- Alec Reid, 82, Irish priest and peacemaker.
- Robert B. Rutherford, 81–82, American vascular surgeon, scientific journal editor, and medical textbook author.
- Reggie September, 90, South African politician and trade unionist, MP (1994–2004).
- Reg Simpson, 93, English Test cricketer.
- Willis Ware, 93, American computer scientist.

=== 23 ===
- Connie Broden, 81, Canadian ice hockey player (Montreal Canadiens).
- Corrado Castellari, 68, Italian singer-songwriter and composer.
- Al Forman, 85, American baseball umpire.
- Walter Frosch, 62, German footballer.
- Helena Gąsienica Daniel, 79, Polish Olympic cross-country skier.
- Nikolai Kondratenko, 73, Russian politician, Governor of Krasnodar Krai (1997–2001).
- Jay Leggett, 50, American actor, writer and comedian (Employee of the Month, Without a Paddle, In Living Color), heart attack.
- Peter B. Lewis, 80, American businessman (Progressive Corporation) and philanthropist.
- William Jerome McCormack, 89, American Roman Catholic prelate, Auxiliary Bishop of New York (1986–2001).
- Wayne Mills, 44, American country music singer, shot.
- Raphael Nomiye, 50, Nigerian politician and legislator.
- Costanzo Preve, 70, Italian Marxist philosopher.
- Solveig Muren Sanden, 95, Norwegian illustrator.
- Delbert Tibbs, 74, American anti-death penalty activist.

=== 24 ===
- Amedeo Amadei, 92, Italian international footballer.
- József Becsei, 63, Hungarian footballer.
- Charlie Bicknell, 85, American baseball player (Philadelphia Phillies).
- Nancy Borwick, 78, Australian Olympic athlete.
- Matthew Bucksbaum, 87, American businessman (General Growth Properties).
- Jim Cason, 86, American football player (San Francisco 49ers, Los Angeles Rams).
- Lorenzo Coleman, 38, American basketball player (Harlem Globetrotters), aortic aneurysm.
- Arnaud Coyot, 33, French cyclist, traffic collision.
- Patrick DeFilippo, 74, Italian–born Canadian mobster, cancer.
- Danièle Dupré, 75, French singer.
- Qusai Emad Al-Khawaldeh, 19, Jordanian footballer, asphyxiation.
- Hermine de Graaf, 62, Dutch novelist.
- Lou Hyndman, 78, Canadian politician, Alberta provincial minister.
- Jun-Ichi Igusa, 89, Japanese mathematician.
- June Keithley, 66, Filipino television journalist and actress, cancer.
- Jean King, 87, American politician, Lieutenant Governor of Hawaii (1978–1982), pancreatic cancer.
- Gerrit Krol, 79, Dutch author, essayist and writer.
- Lloyd Lange, 76, Australian politician, member of the New South Wales Legislative Council (1974–1986).
- Robin Leigh-Pemberton, Baron Kingsdown, 87, British peer and banker, Governor of the Bank of England (1983–1993).
- Marian Măuță, 37, Romanian footballer.
- Matti Ranin, 87, Finnish actor.
- Wenceslao Sarmiento, 91, Peruvian-born American modernist architect.
- Jerry Seeman, 77, American football official (National Football League), cancer.
- David B. Thompson, 90, American Roman Catholic prelate, Bishop of Charleston (1990−1999).
- Charlie Ware, 80, Irish hurler (Waterford).

=== 25 ===
- William Adam, 96, American trumpeter and bandleader.
- Lou Brissie, 89, American baseball player (Philadelphia Athletics), cardiopulmonary failure.
- Chae Myung-shin, 86, South Korean Army general during the Vietnam War.
- Wayne K. Clymer, 96, American bishop.
- Oralia Domínguez, 88, Mexican opera singer.
- Ricardo Fort, 45, Argentinian entrepreneur, television personality, dancer and artist, heart failure.
- Bill Foulkes, 81, English footballer (Manchester United, England).
- Paul Gnaier, 87, German Olympic fencer (1960, 1964, 1968).
- Robert Guillin, 87, French Olympic basketball player.
- Shyamali Gupta, 68, Indian politician, heart attack.
- Musue Noha Haddad, 44, Liberian journalist.
- Chico Hamilton, 92, American jazz drummer.
- Ryōko Kinomiya, 82, Japanese voice actress (Galaxy Express 999, Speed Racer, Hell Teacher Nube), MODS.
- Greg Kovacs, 44, Canadian professional bodybuilder, heart failure.
- Joel Lane, 50, British author.
- Egon Lánský, 79, Czech journalist and politician, Deputy Prime Minister (1998–1999).
- Elke Neidhardt, 72, German-born Australian opera director (Ring cycles) and actress (Skippy the Bush Kangaroo).
- Ken Peters, 98, American baseball player and actor.
- Al Plastino, 91, American comic book artist (Superman), prostate cancer.
- John Shaw, 56, English radio broadcaster, leptospirosis.
- Zéphyrin Toé, 84, Burkinabé Roman Catholic prelate, Bishop of Nouna (1973−2000) and Dédougou (2000−2005).
- Toshiaki Tsushima, 77, Japanese film score composer (The Fall of Ako Castle, Battles Without Honor and Humanity), pneumonia.
- Seiji Tsutsumi, 86, Japanese writer and businessman, chairman of Seibu Department Stores, liver failure.

=== 26 ===
- Toon Becx, 93, Dutch footballer (Willem II).
- William Coperthwaite, 83, American yurt builder, traffic collision.
- Arik Einstein, 74, Israeli singer, songwriter and actor, aortic aneurysm.
- Marcello Gatti, 89, Italian cinematographer, winner of five Nastro d'Argento awards.
- John Galbraith Graham, 92, British crossword compiler ("Araucaria" of The Guardian) and Church of England priest.
- Slobodan Karalić, 57, Yugoslav footballer.
- Jane Kean, 90, American actress (The Honeymooners), complications from a fall.
- Saul Leiter, 89, American photographer and painter.
- Tony Musante, 77, American actor (As the World Turns, Oz, We Own the Night), complications following surgery.
- Temistocle Popa, 92, Romanian composer (Veronica, Ma-ma), instrumentalist and actor.
- Bracha Qafih, 90, Israeli rabbanit, recipient of the Israel Prize (1999).
- Cayetano Ré, 75, Paraguayan footballer (Barcelona, Espanyol) and manager.
- Raimondo Ricci, 92, Italian politician and partisan.
- Himachal Som, Indian diplomat.
- Jörg Spengler, 74, German Olympic bronze-medalist sailor (1976).
- Stan Stennett, 88, Welsh comic entertainer, actor and jazz musician, complications following stroke.
- William Stevenson, 89, British-born Canadian writer.

=== 27 ===
- Attilio Bravi, 77, Italian Olympic long jumper (1960).
- Lewis Collins, 67, British actor (The Professionals), cancer.
- Herbert F. DeSimone, 84, American politician and lawyer, Attorney General of Rhode Island (1967−1971).
- Rashit Khamidulin, 76, Russian Soviet diplomat.
- Rudolf Lorenzen, 91, German author.
- John Massengale, 73–74, American football player.
- Mieno Eiko, 87, Japanese politician, chronic heart failure.
- David Peleg, 71, Israeli diplomat, Ambassador to Poland (2004–2009).
- Volker Roemheld, 72, German agricultural scientist.
- Nílton Santos, 88, Brazilian footballer (Botafogo), World Cup champion (1958, 1962), lung infection.
- Manuel F. Segura, 94, Filipino army officer and author.
- Wolf Jobst Siedler, 87, German publisher.
- Waldemar Świerzy, 82, Polish artist.
- Avraham Verdiger, 92, Israeli politician.

=== 28 ===
- R. I. T. Alles, 81, Sri Lankan educationalist.
- Larry Banner, 77, American Olympic gymnast.
- Eduard Liviu Bartales, 59, Romanian footballer.
- Howard Clark, 63, English pacifist.
- Elwood, 8, American Chinese crested/chihuahua dog, World's Ugliest Dog (2007).
- Mike Jenkins, 31, American professional strongman, enlarged heart.
- Jack Matthews, 88, American book collector and author of philosophical fiction.
- Mitja Ribičič, 94, Slovenian politician, Prime Minister of Yugoslavia (1969–1971).
- Ronald Clair Roat, 67, American author and journalist.
- Jean-Louis Roux, 90, Canadian actor and politician, Lieutenant Governor of Quebec (1996).
- Beyle Schaechter-Gottesman, 93, Austrian-born American Yiddish language poet and folk singer.
- Mohamed Sibari, 68, Moroccan author.
- Max Georg von Twickel, 87, German Roman Catholic prelate, Auxiliary Bishop of Münster (1973−2001).
- Danny Wells, 72, Canadian-born American actor (The Jeffersons, Magnolia, Private Benjamin), cancer.

=== 29 ===
- Salomon Bengondo, 26, Cameroonian footballer.
- Robert L. Bergman, 65, American politician and businessman, esophageal cancer.
- Gordie Bonin, 65, Canadian race car driver, member of the Canadian Motorsport Hall of Fame (2000).
- Ian Butterworth, 82, British particle physicist.
- Clara Cannucciari, 98, American chef and author.
- Oliver Cheatham, 65, American singer ("Get Down Saturday Night"), heart attack.
- Charles Cooper, 87, American actor (Star Trek, Perry Mason).
- Leo Cooper, 79, British writer.
- Dick Dodd, 68, American musician (The Bel-Airs, Eddie and the Showmen, The Standells), and Mouseketeer, cancer.
- Colin Eglin, 88, South African politician.
- Natalya Gorbanevskaya, 77, Russian poet, translator and civil rights activist.
- Chris Howland, 85, British-born German radio and television presenter.
- Douglas Jones, 91, British mathematician.
- Michael Kammen, 77, American historian.
- Peter W. Kaplan, 59, American newspaper editor (The New York Observer), cancer.
- Bram van der Lek, 82, Dutch politician, MP (1967–1971, 1972–1978), Senator (1983–1984), member of the European Parliament (1984–1989).
- Baku Mahadeva, 91, Sri Lankan civil servant.
- Vincent Marchiselli, 85, American politician, member of the New York State Assembly, heart attack.
- Alfred Monnin, 93, Canadian judge.
- Valdis Muižnieks, 78, Latvian Soviet Olympic silver medalist basketball player (1956, 1960, 1964), European champion (1957, 1959, 1961).
- Brian Torrey Scott, 37, American writer, colon cancer.

=== 30 ===
- Waldyr Calheiros Novaes, 90, Brazilian Roman Catholic prelate, Bishop of Barra do Piraí-Volta Redonda (1966−1999).
- Clifford Chadderton, 94, Canadian charity executive (The War Amps).
- Paul Crouch, 79, American broadcaster, founder of Trinity Broadcasting Network, heart failure.
- Vera Houghton, 99, British health campaigner.
- Masino Intaray, 70, Filipino poet, bard artist, and musician.
- Bob Jake, 90, American basketball player and doctor.
- Jean Kent, 92, English actress (The Browning Version), complications from a fall.
- Moussa Konaté, 62, Malian author and playwright.
- Baldassare Porto, 90, Italian Olympic sprinter (1952).
- Raghuram, 64, Indian film choreographer, heart attack.
- Tabu Ley Rochereau, 76, Congolese rumba singer, complications from a stroke.
- Doriano Romboni, 44, Italian motorcycle racer, race collision.
- Georgina Somerset, 90, British dentist and Royal Navy officer.
- Paul Walker, 40, American actor (The Fast and the Furious, Pleasantville, Flags of Our Fathers), traffic collision.
- Yury Yakovlev, 85, Russian actor (The Irony of Fate, Anna Karenina, Ivan Vasilievich: Back to the Future).
