= Raymond H. A. Carter =

French soldier and security consultant

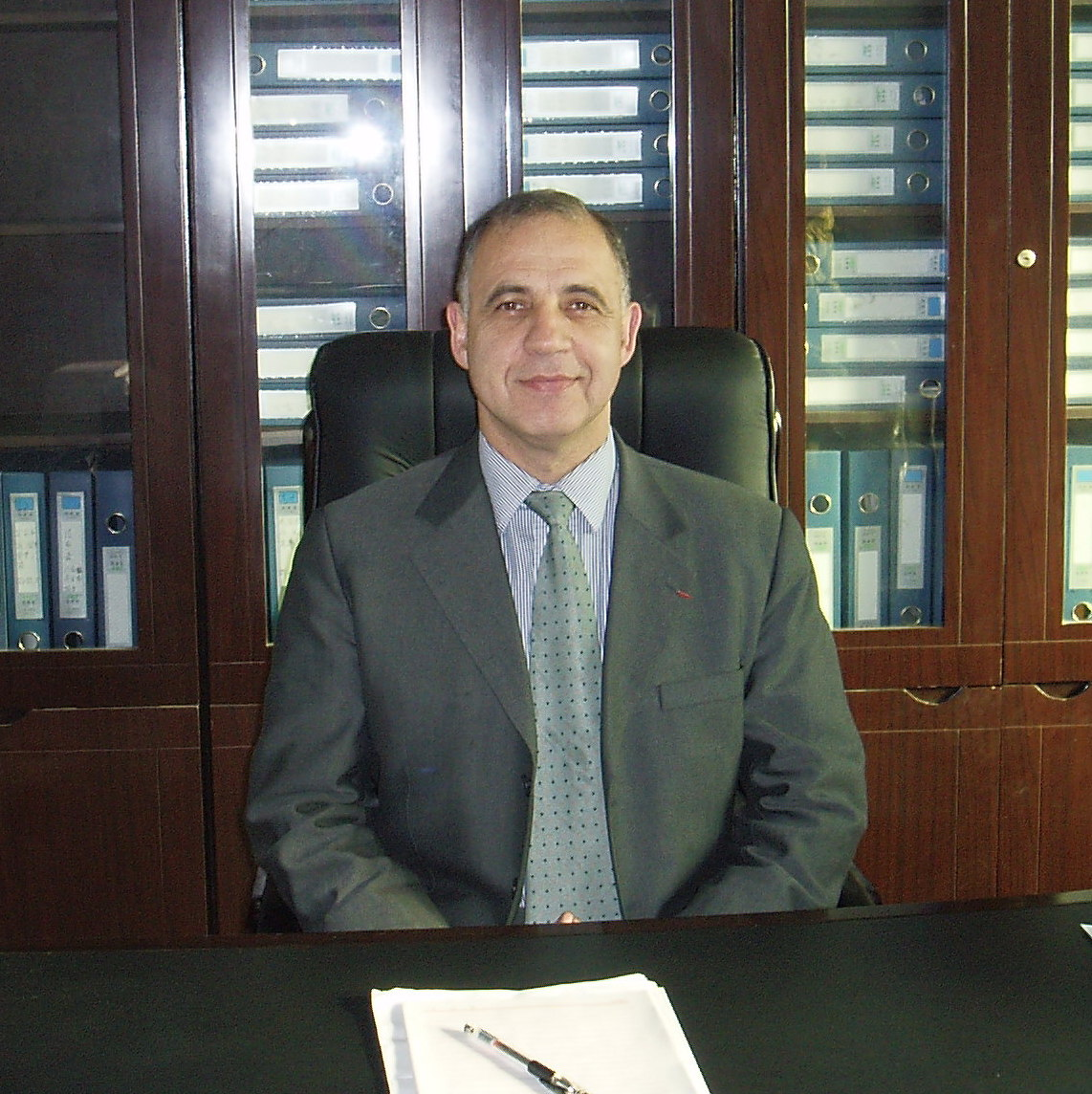
- Born: 17 April 1955 (age 71); Rochefort-sur-Mer
- Military career
- Branch: French Army
- Service years: 35 years
- Rank: Retired Colonel
- Awards: Chevalier de la Légion d’Honneur, Chevalier de l’Ordre National du Mérite, titulaire de la Croix de la Valeur Militaire, and Officier de l’Ordre des Palmes académiques.

Raymond H. A. Carter (born 17 April 1955, Rochefort-sur-Mer, France) was a Gendarmerie Nationale senior officer who served for thirty-five years. He is an expert consultant in the field of international security. Carter is also an accomplished exponent of the martial arts.

== Early life and education ==
Carter was born in Rochefort-sur-Mer on April 17, 1955. His father was Raymond A. D. Carter, an artist. His mother was Lucinda Carter née Da Silva Peixoto from Portugal, changing her name on receiving French citizenship. She was responsible for the education of Carter, his brother, Gilles and their two sisters while their father was serving in the military.

In 1989, Carter received a degree in aeronautical science. In 1990, he received a diploma of criminology from the Bordeaux Institute of Criminal Sciences. In 1998, Carter completed a doctorate of philosophy in public law at the University of Nice Sophia Antipolis. In 2004, he completed a doctorate of philosophy in international penal law at the University of Poitiers.

== Military career ==
In 1973, Carter enlisted in the Gendarmerie in La Rochelle, France. He was first posted in the Auxiliary police. In 1974, he transferred to the Non-Commissioned Officer training school in Châtellerault - Leblanc. His martial arts skills were recognised and he became an assistant instructor. In 1980, Carter graduated Major de Promotion (top of his class). He was appointed Maréchal-des-logis-Chef, and then joined the Ecole des Officiers de la Gendarmerie Nationale (EOGN) (the national military police officer training school) in Melun.

In 1981, Carter began his military career proper in the rank of lieutenant. Between 1983 and 1987, Carter worked in an anti-riot unit and commanded the Égletons, a mobile platoon securing the private residence of the President of the Republic, Jacques Chirac. In 1987, Carter transferred to the air branch as a helicopter and aeroplane pilot. Carter then became an aeronautical instructor in Africa where he led search and rescue missions and criminal investigations. In 1997, Carter was appointed second-in-command, Gendarmerie Départementale, Vendée.

In 1999, Carter was assigned to a foreign operations unit. He made a tour of duty in Yugoslavia under NATO. In 2000, he joined the United Nations Mission in Bosnia and Herzegovina as commander of the international police task force's high commissioner’s cabinet. In Sarajevo, he led an anti-terrorism unit and worked on Transnational Organized Crime, war crimes, and crimes against humanity.

In 2002, at the request of Carla Del Ponte, prosecutor for the minister of defence, Michèle Alliot-Marie, Carter transferred to the International Criminal Tribunal for the former Yugoslavia (ICTY) and went to The Hague as a security adviser to the prosecutor. Also, at the request of the ICTY prosecutor, he formed and managed the Tracking, Intelligence and Fugitive Unit (TIFU).

In 2004, Carter was made lieutenant-colonel, second in command at the Gendarmerie des transports aériens (GTA) in charge of security at French airports. From 2005 to 2006, Carter was assigned to the National Defence Secretary General's department, reporting directly to the Prime Minister of France. He also managed contacts within the G8. Carter remains within the operational reserve.

== International consultancy ==
Carter lives in Ivory Coast and is a consultant in France and Africa in the area of transport structure and superstructure security.

Carter also works for the European Commission, the United Nations, and the Centre Régional de Formation à la lutte contre la drogue in Grand-Bassam, Ivory Coast.

== Educational roles ==
In 1995, Carter founded the Académie du Couteau et Défense en Situation (A.C.D.S.) (Academy of situational defence and knife fighting). In 2006, he founded the Association Nature et Sport Endurance (association of nature and sports endurance). In 2004, Carter became a professor of international criminal law at the Centre d'Etudes Diplomatiques et Stratégiques (C.E.D.S) in Paris; an associate professor teaching international criminal law and international security and defense at Paris Descartes University. In 2008, Carter became an associate professor at the Centre d’Étude et de Recherche pour les activités de la paix (C.E.R.A.P.). In 2007, Carter was an expert educational adviser to the European Colleague of Policing.

== Martial arts ==
At the age of 14, Raymond Carter began karate and aikido at the "Club Rochelais d’Aïkido-Karaté" (CRAK) and attained 1st Dan) in aikido. In 1971, he met the senior master of aikido, Nobuyoshi Tamura, and in 1979, he founded the Aïkido-Club Haut-Alpin, the first aikido club in the Hautes-Alpes. Carter's mentors in the 1980s were André Nocquet, Guy Sauvin (master of karate), and Claude Pellerin, Aikido master, Kim Oriel, Frédéric Fred Perrin (knife fighter), Ljubomir Vračarević (founder of the Yugoslav Real Aikido martial art), and Charles Joussot. Carter has founded a number of martial arts clubs in France and abroad, such as the Aïkido Klub Morihei Sarajevo in Bosnia-Herzegovina, and others in Mali, and the Ivory Coast.

In 1982, in association with Kim Oriol of the Groupe d’Intervention de la Gendarmerie Nationale (G.I.G.N.) Carter published a self-defence manual for officers and cadets.

In 2004, in association with Roger Cadiou, Carter designed and developed a program of underwater combat techniques. Carter is an honorary member of the French Federation Close Combat club.

Carter has received a number of sports awards including the French National Professor’s Diploma (aikido); the Mali National Professor Diploma in martial arts and combat sports (judo, jiu-jitsu, aikido and karate, self-defence and boxing; the French National Swimming Teacher’s Diploma; Brevet d’Etat d’Educateur Sportif des Activités de la Natation (the French National Sports Teacher’s Diploma in aquatic and swimming technique); various martial arts teacher and trainer certificates; and the World Center of Ninbudo Aikijutsu 5th Dan certificate.

== Selected works ==
- La sûreté des transports, les transports face aux risques et menaces terroristes. (2008) Presses Universitaires De France.
- Combat et Défense Aquatiques (2007) Chiron.
- Stress et défense personnelle, bien s'en sortir en cas d'aggression. (2006) with Yves Le Mée, Chiron.
- Le tribunal international pour l'ex-Yougoslavie (2005) with a preface by Jean Pradel, L'Harmattan.
- Le piège de la drogue (1998) Chiron.
- La boxe thaïlandaise et le kick-boxing (1997) with Pascal Boyard, Chiron.
- Technique de combat au corps-à-corps (1992 and 2003) with Kim Oriol, Chiron, (in three volumes)
- Pharmacodépendance et pharmacodélinquance (1990) with a preface by R. Bourdon and L. Hovnanian, Chiron.
