= Jens Scheer =

German physicist (1935–1994)

Jens Scheer (30 May 1935 – 18 July 1994), was a physicist, professor of nuclear physics at the University of Bremen and one of Germany's best-known anti-nuclear activists.

Scheer was a member of the Communist Party of Germany (KPD). For reason of his KPD-membership and his political activities, Scheer was threatened in 1975 with the loss of his academic position at the University of Bremen and an interdiction of enacting his profession, as membership in the KPD and his position as university professor were considered incompatible. The legal proceedings lasted for about five years, after which the final verdict was the payment of a fine.

One of Scheer's main research interests was low-level radiation and its effects on human beings. He claimed that radiation exposure at critical moments in life weakens the immune system, thus leading to a higher susceptibility to infectious diseases. After the Chernobyl disaster of 1986, he invested considerable efforts in attempting to determine the extent of damage caused in the longer term by this disaster.

In an article, Scheer claimed that low-level radiation had caused the death of millions, when all direct and indirect effects of radiation are taken together. His view was criticized as unfounded.

Scheer also published on several stochastic models proposed in the context of quantum theory, in particular those advanced by Jean-Pierre Vigier and by J.C. Aron, and he criticized a prevalence of positivism in quantum physics.

In 1994, Scheer died of heart failure.

== Publications ==
Articles relating to low-level radiation and Chernobyl

- Jens Scheer: Neonatal mortality in Germany since the Chernobyl explosion, British Medical Journal 1992;304:843.3, Letter, March 1992, doi:10.1136/bmj.304.6830.843-b
- Jens Scheer: How many Chernobyl fatalities?, Scientific Correspondence, Nature 326, 449, April 1987, doi:10.1038/326449b0

Articles and book chapters on quantum physics

- Jens Scheer: A view of EPR non-locality problems based on Aron's stochastic foundation of relativity, Foundations of Physics Letters, vol. 3, no. 6, pp. 577–580, 1990, doi:10.1007/BF00666026
- Jens Scheer, Klaus Götsch, Thomas Koch, Günter Lüning, Michael Schmidt, Heiko Ziggel: A possible evidence for a violation of Heisenberg's position-momentum uncertainty relation, Foundations of Physics Letters, vol. 2, no. 1, pp. 71–79, 1989, doi:10.1007/BF00690080
- Jens Scheer, Michael Schmidt: Remarks on EPR-related concepts from a realistic point of view, In Alwyn Van der Merwe, Franco Selleri, G. Tarozzi (eds.): Microphysical Reality and Quantum Formalism: Proceedings of the Conference, 1988, Kluwer Academic Publishers, ISBN 90-277-2684-1 (vol. 2), p. 253–266

Other

- Jens Scheer: Gegen die Kopenhagener Deutung der Quantentheorie ("Against the Copenhague interpretation of quantum mechanics"), interview with Jens Scheer by Klaus v. Bloh, held in June/July 1994, Streitbarer Materialismus, no. 20 (in German language)
- Jens Scheer: Lebendige Debatte über tote Katze ("Live debate about dead cat"), Streitbarer Materialismus, no. 20 (in German language)
- Jens Scheer: Radioaktive Niedrigstrahlung ("Low-leel radiation"), Streitbarer Materialismus, no. 16 (in German language)
- Jens Scheer: Kommunismus – Naturalismus – Humanismus ("Communism – Naturalism – Humanism"), Streitbarer Materialismus, no. 14 (in German language)
- Jens Scheer: Niels Bohr vom Kopf auf die Füße stellen ("Putting Niels Bohr from his head back on his feet"), Streitbarer Materialismus, no. 12 (in German language)
- Jens Scheer: Eine tote Katze in Schrödingers Kasten ("A dead cat in Schrödinger's box"), Streitbarer Materialismus, no. 12 (in German language)

== See also ==
- Anti-nuclear movement in Germany
- John Gofman
