= Twickel (disambiguation) =

Twickel is a protected historic country estate in the municipality of Hof van Twente, the Netherlands.

Twickel may also refer to:

- Twickel family, old Westphalian noble family
- Max Georg von Twickel (1926–2013), German clergyman, Auxiliary Bishop in Münster
