= Emilio Santos Corchero =

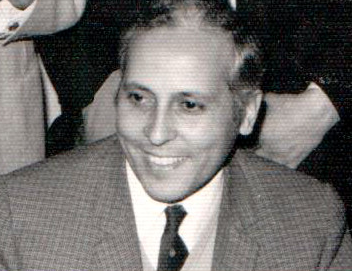
E. Santos, 1972

Emilio Santos Corchero, born 7 October 1935 (San Vicente de Alcantara, Extremadura, Spain), is a theoretical physicist, professor at the Universities of Costa Rica (1964–68), Valladolid (1968-76) and Cantabria (Spain) (1976-). In the year 1998 he received the Medal of the Spanish Society of Physics.

His scientific work (about 100 articles in scientific journals) has been mainly devoted to develop a stochastic interpretation of quantum mechanics that maintains strict causality (i. e. supporting Albert Einstein’s opinion that "God does not play dice"). In that interpretation the dispersion of results in the measurements is due to lack of control of all relevant factors rather than to a lack of causality (as many quantum physicists believe). For a summary see Foundations of Science, 20, 357-386 (2015). An application has been the study of "parametric down conversion" experiments using the Wigner representation of quantum optics; see European Physical Journal D 13, 109-119 (2001) (in collaboration with A. Casado, T. W. Marshall and R. Risco-Delgado) and references therein. A related subject of interest has been the meaning of the Bell inequalities and the requirements for their empirical tests to be reliable. See Physics Letters 98A, 5-9 (1983) (in collaboration with F. Selleri and T. W. Marshall), Physics Letters 115A, 363-365 (1986), Physical Review A 46, 3646-3656 (1992), International Journal of Theoretical Physics 42, 2545-2555 (2003). The stochastic interpretation rests upon the assumption that the quantum vacuum consists of real fields. Their fluctuations might explain the "dark energy" recently discovered in cosmology; see Astrophysics and Space Science, 332, 423-435 (2011). Another subject of interest has been the study of relativistic stars in order to see whether some modifications of general relativity (possibly of quantum origin) might prevent the collapse to singularities ("black holes"); see Astrophysics and Space Science 341, 411-416 (2012).

En 2022 Santos published the book Realistic Interpretation of Quantum Mechanics, summing up his scientific career and proposing that some of the apparent violations of local realism in quantum phenomena admit a realistic explanation by treating the vacuum fields as real entities.
