= Lounis =

Lounis is both a surname and a given name. People with the name include:

- Lounis Ait Menguellet
- Walid Lounis
- Lounis Matem
