= Costiniu =

Costiniu is a Romanian surname. Notable people with the surname include:

- Florin Costiniu (born 1954), Romanian lawyer and judge
- Geo Costiniu (1950−2013), Romanian actor
