= Komatsubara =

Komatsubara (Japanese: 小松原, small pine field) is a Japanese surname.

Notable people with this surname include:

- Kazuo Komatsubara (一男 or 一夫, 1943–2000), Japanese animator
- Manabu Komatsubara (学, born 1981), Japanese footballer
- Michitarō Komatsubara (道太郎, 1885–1940), Japanese general
- Misato Komatsubara (美里, born 1992), Japanese ice dancer
- Mitsugu Komatsubara (貢 or 女貢, born 1953), Japanese reporter and amateur astronomer
  - 9103 Komatsubara, main-belt asteroid named after Mitsugu Komatsubara
- Mitsuo Komatsubara (三夫, 1920–2013), Japanese golfer
- Shigeru Komatsubara (茂, born 1949), Japanese cinematographer
