= Peter Frank =

Peter Frank may refer to:

- Peter Frank (academic) (1934–2013), British academic and Russia specialist
- Peter Frank (art critic) (born 1950), American art critic
- Peter Frank (footballer) (born 1970), former Danish footballer
- Peter Frank (jurist) (born 1968), German Public Prosecutor General
- Peter Frank (actor) (1920–1984), actor in The Terrible People (1960 film) and other films

== See also ==
- Pete Frank (1930–2005), NASA flight director
