= Antoni Tomiczek =

Polish pilot of World War II

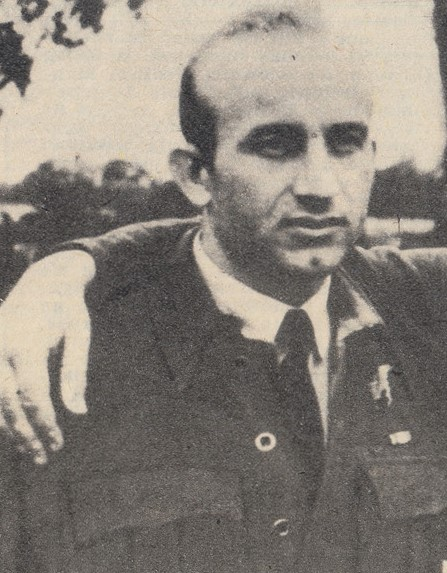
- Born: 15 November 1915
- Died: 19 November 2013 (aged 98)
- Allegiance: Poland
- Branch: Polish Air Force

Antoni Tomiczek (13 November 1915 – 19 November 2013) was a Polish pilot of World War II.

== Biography ==
Tomiczek was born in Pstrążna in Silesia. His parents were Francis Tomiczek (an employee of the Coal Mine in Rydułtowy) and Marianna (née Szymiczek).

From 1922 to 1930, he attended school in Pstrążna. After graduating, he joined the School of Infantry NCOs to minors in Konin. He took part in addressing Trans-Olza in October 1938. Immediately after, he was directed to the course instructors in Warsaw (theoretical) and Radom (practical training).

On 20 November 1946, Antoni Tomiczek ended his service in the Polish Air Force to become an ensign warrant officer. He decided to return to the country, and on 12 May 1947, for the first time in many years, he stood on Polish soil in Gdańsk. He returned to Upper Silesia, his homeland. Tomiczek later belonged to the Association of South Polish Airmen in Jaworzno and the Senior Aviation Club in Katowice. For his actions in combat during World War II, he was awarded the Cross of Valor twice. He also received the Medal of the Yugoslav Medalja "Smrt fasizmu – Sloboda of the Nation," the Knight's Cross of Merit (Officer's Cross of the Polish Revival), and the Order of Merit for the Katowice Province.

== Sources (Polish language) ==
- GimnazjumLyski.pl
- Katowice.Gazeta.pl
- Lokalna24.pl
- Polishairforce.pl
