= Dimitri Mihalas =

Greek-American astronomer and astrophysicist at Los Alamos National Laboratory

- Born: March 20, 1939; Los Angeles, California, U.S.
- Died: November 21, 2013 (aged 74)
- Known for: Astronomy

Dimitri Manuel Mihalas (March 20, 1939 – November 21, 2013) was a laboratory fellow at the Los Alamos National Laboratory in the field of astronomy, astrophysics, and stellar atmospheres. He was born in Los Angeles, California and was of Greek origin.

Mihalas obtained his bachelor's degree in physics, mathematics, and astronomy from the University of California, Los Angeles, in 1959. In one year, he received his master's degree from California Institute of Technology in 1960. He completed his PhD degree in three years in 1963 in physics and astronomy, also from California Institute of Technology.

At a very early age of 42, he became a member of the National Academy of Sciences.

Besides a large number of scientific papers, mostly related to radiative transfer, Mihalas authored reference books such as "Stellar Atmospheres".

Mihalas had bipolar disorder. He wrote a number of essays and books on the problem.

Scientific books

- D. Mihalas (in collaboration with P.M. Routly) - Galactic Astronomy. (San Francisco: W. H. Freeman & Company), 1968
- D. Mihalas - Stellar Atmospheres. (San Francisco: W. H. Freeman & Company), 1970
- D. Mihalas, B. Pagel, and P. Souffrin Theorie des Atmospheres Stellaires. First Advanced Course of the Swiss Society for Astronomy and Astrophysics. (Geneva: Observatoire de Geneve), 1971
- D. Mihalas - Stellar Atmospheres. 2nd ed. (San Francisco: W. H. Freeman & Company), 1978
- D. Mihalas and J. Binney - Galactic Astronomy: Structure and Kinematics of Galaxies. (San Francisco: W.H. Freeman & Company), 1981 [948]
- D. Mihalas and B. W. Mihalas - Foundations of Radiation Hydrodynamics. (New York: Oxford University Press), 1984. Paperback Edition, (New York: Dover Publications, Inc.), 1999
- R. J. LeVeque, D. Mihalas, E. A. Dorfi, and E. Muller - Computational Methods for Astrophysical Fluid Flow. Saas-Fee Advanced Course 27. Swiss Society for Astronomy and Astrophysics. (Berlin: Springer Verlag), 1998
- Stellar Atmosphere Modeling: Proceedings of an International Workshop Held in Tubingen, Germany, 8–12 April 2002 Stellar Atmosphere Modeling: Proceedings of an International Workshop Held in Tubingen, Germany, 8–12 April 2002 (Astronomical Society of the pacific), 2003 (Editors: D. Mihalas, I. Hubeny, K. Werner)
- I. Hubený and D. Mihalas - Theory of Stellar Atmospheres: An Introduction to Astrophysical Non-equilibrium Quantitative Spectroscopic Analysis. (Princeton: Princeton University Press) 2015

Non-science books

- D. Mihalas - Coming Back From The Dead, 1990
- D. Mihalas, A. Sawyer, L. Wainwright - Trilogy in a Minor Key. (Trilogy Productions), 1991
- D. Mihalas - Cantata for Six Lives And Continuo, 1992
- D. Mihalas, C. Pursifull - If I Should Die before I Wake If I Should Die before I Wake. (Hawk Productions), 1993
- D. Mihalas - Dream Shadows, 1994
- D. Mihalas - Depression and Spiritual Growth. (Pendle Hill Publications), 1996
- D. Mihalas - Life Matters: Poems by Dimitri Mihalas, 1995
- D. Mihalas - The World Is My Witness, 1997
- D. Mihalas - A Distant Summons, 1998
