= Daniel J. Shanefield =

American engineer

Daniel Jay Shanefield (April 29, 1930 – November 13, 2013) was a United States ceramic engineer.

Shanefield was born in Orange, New Jersey, and earned a bachelor's degree in chemistry from Rutgers University in 1956; he went on to graduate studies at the same university, receiving his Ph.D. in physical chemistry from Rutgers in 1962. He worked from 1962 to 1967 at ITT Research Laboratories, and from 1967 to 1986 at Bell Laboratories. In 1986 he returned to Rutgers as a Professor II (a professorial rank at Rutgers that is one step above a normal full professor).

At Bell Laboratories, Shanefield was the co-inventor with Richard E. Mistler of the tape casting technique for forming thin ceramic films. He pioneered the development of a phase-change memory system based on an earlier patent of Stanford R. Ovshinsky; Shanefield's work in this area "represented the first proof of the phase change memory concept". Beginning in the mid-1970s, Shanefield was an early proponent of double-blind ABX testing of high-end audio electronics; in 1980 he reported in High Fidelity magazine that there were no audible differences between several different power amplifiers, setting off what became known in audiophile circles as "the great debate".

Shanefield is the author of two books, Organic Additives and Ceramic Processing (Kluwer, 1995; 2nd ed., Kluwer, 1996) and Industrial Electronics for Engineers, Chemists, and Technicians (William Andrew Publishing, 2001).

He was a four-time winner of the AT&T Outstanding Achievement Award and was elected as a Fellow of the American Ceramic Society in 1993.

Shanefield died in Honolulu, Hawaii, aged 83.
