= Ronald Clair Roat =

American novelist

- Born: April 4, 1946; Pontiac, Michigan, United States
- Died: November 28, 2013 (aged 67); Ludington, Michigan
- Occupation: Novelist

Ronald Clair Roat (April 4, 1946 – November 28, 2013) was the author of the Stuart Mallory Mystery Series. He graduated from Michigan State University in 1968 with a bachelor's in journalism. Later that year he was drafted into the U.S. Army and served about two years with a Nike Hercules missile battalion near Pittsburgh, Pa. Before becoming a journalism professor, he worked for several newspapers as a professional reporter, editor, or columnist. The newspapers included the Lansing State Journal, Dominion News (Morgantown, W.Va.), Dayton Daily News, and The Times in Frankfort, Ind. He served as a journalism professor at the University of Southern Indiana in Evansville, Indiana, between 1986 and 2008 when he retired.

== Stuart Mallory Mystery Series ==
The series consists of three books:

- Close Softly the Doors
- A Still and Icy Silence
- High Walk
