= Katherine Hagedorn =

American ethnomusicologist

- Born: Katherine Johanna Hagedorn; October 16, 1961; Summit, New Jersey, U.S.
- Died: November 12, 2013 (aged 52)
- Education: B.A. Tufts University, Spanish, Russian and English studies, minor in classical piano; Johns Hopkins University, master's degree, international relations; Brown University, master's and PhD in ethnomusicology
- Occupations: Ethnomusicologist, Santería priestess
- Employer: Pomona College
- Known for: Research on Afro-Cuban religious and folkloric performance
- Board member of: National Society for Ethnomusicology
- Spouse: Terry Ryan
- Parent(s): Fred and Grace Hagedorn
- Awards: White House fellow; California Professor of the Year award, 2000; Mellon New Directions Fellowship; Alan Merriam Prize, 2002

Katherine Johanna Hagedorn (October 16, 1961 – November 12, 2013) was an American ethnomusicologist. Born in Summit, New Jersey to a white family, she became a traditional Cuban drummer and Santería priestess.

She spent her career as a Professor of Music at Pomona College in Claremont, California, where she directed the Ethnomusicology Program, served as co-coordinator of the Gender & Women’s Studies Program, and became an associate dean. She also served as a "scholar-in-residence at Harvard University’s Center for the Study of World Religions and as a visiting professor at the University of California, Santa Barbara."

Trained in languages and classical piano at Tufts University, Hagedorn earned an M.A. in Soviet Studies at Johns Hopkins University. She became a White House fellow, and worked on the Afghanistan desk at the State Department.

Starting in 1989, Hagedorn traveled to Cuba to study the batá drum in Matanzas Province. There, she was initiated as a Santería priestess. At Pomona, she taught the batá drum, Tuvan throat singing, and directed a Balinese Gamelan ensemble. Her classes were described as "emphatically participatory, not to mention loud."

Her best known work is Divine Utterances: The Performance of Afro-Cuban Santería.

== Works ==
- Hagedorn, Katherine J. (2001). Divine utterances: the performance of Afro-Cuban Santería. Washington, D.C.: Smithsonian Institution Press. ISBN 156098922X.
- Hagedorn, Katherine J. (2006). "Toward a Theology of Sound". Harvard Divinity Bulletin. 34 (2). Archived from the original on October 9, 2013.
- "Katherine J. Hagedorn". Microsoft Academic Search. Archived from the original on September 25, 2015.
