= John Bell Jr. (artist) =

American painter and sculptor

- Born: John Bell Jr. October 4, 1937; Fort Smith, Arkansas, United States
- Died: November 8, 2013 (aged 76); Fort Smith, Arkansas, United States
- Occupations: Painter, sculptor
- Years active: 1965–2013
- Website: John Bell Jr

John Bell Jr. (October 4, 1937 – November 8, 2013) was an American painter and sculptor whose career spanned nearly fifty years.

Bell was born in Fort Smith, Arkansas on October 4, 1937, the son of Oklahoma-born parents John Sr. and Lillian L. Bell (née Sweeten). He graduated from Northside High School and University of Arkansas in 1965.

In August 2013, Bell was diagnosed with stomach cancer. He subsequently died of the illness on November 8, 2013, aged 76, at his Fort Smith home. Bell was survived by his wife, Maxine, of fifty years, a daughter (born 1965), a granddaughter, and his brother.

== Legacy ==
In 2022, the city of Fort Smith, Arkansas approved the naming of a new park along Riverfront Drive after the late artist. John Bell Jr. Park will be 51 acres and include soccer fields, an inclusive playground, and options for future expansion.
