= Robert B. Rutherford =

American vascular surgeon (1931–2013)

Robert B. Rutherford, MD, (July 29, 1931 – November 22, 2013) was an American vascular surgeon, scientific journal editor, and medical textbook author. He established the definitive textbook in vascular surgery and was a Senior Editor of the Journal of Vascular Surgery.

== Early life and education ==
Rutherford was born in Edmonton, Alberta, Canada. He received his undergraduate degree (Phi Beta Kappa) in 1952 and his medical school education (Alpha Omega Alpha) in 1956, both from Johns Hopkins University. He received his surgical internship training at Johns Hopkins University School of Medicine, then a general surgery residency at the University of Colorado School of Medicine in 1963. During his surgical residency, he spent one year in Malmo, Sweden for a clinical fellowship year as a Fulbright Scholar at Lund University.

== Career ==
Following the completion of his surgical residency in 1963, Rutherford served two years as an officer in the United States Army Medical Corps at the Walter Reed Army Institute of Research. He then joined the surgical faculty at Johns Hopkins in 1965 before returning to the University of Colorado in 1970, where he spent the remainder of his professional career as Professor of Surgery. In 1977, he was appointed the first Chief of Vascular Surgery at the University of Colorado School of Medicine, a position he held until 1996, when he became Professor Emeritus.

During much of the latter half of his career, Rutherford worked to bring uniform standards to the reporting of vascular practices in the professional literature, publishing a series of papers as chairman of the Committee on Reporting Standards of the Society of Vascular Surgery and the American Association for Vascular Surgery. Although he retired as Professor Emeritus in 1996, he continued editorial and committee work.

== Vascular surgery textbook and legacy ==
In 1975, Rutherford recognized the need for a comprehensive textbook devoted exclusively to the new specialty of vascular surgery. He recruited a group of peers to be associate editors, and in 1977, the first edition of Vascular Surgery was published. Over the next 30 years, Rutherford shepherded his textbook through six editions, updating authors, content, and associate editors before assigning editorship to the Society for Vascular Surgery, who agreed to insure its publication in perpetuity. It has become the most widely used vascular surgery textbook worldwide.

In his Presidential Address to the Society of Vascular Surgery annual meeting in 1995, Rutherford emphasized the importance of uniform disease-specific reporting standards for describing vascular interventions, their results, and their complications. Rutherford organized the Society of Vascular Surgery committees that developed the current reporting standards, an initiative that expanded globally when he co-chaired the first TransAtlantic Consensus on Peripheral Arterial Occlusive Disease, in 2000. He also co-chaired the Transatlantic Consensus on Peripheral Arterial Occlusive Disease (TASC) in 2005. That same year, he was the recipient of the first Lifetime Achievement Award given by the Society of Vascular Surgery. At the annual meeting of the SVS in 2006, he was awarded the second annual Julius H. Jacobson II, MD. Award for Physician Excellence given by the Vascular Disease Foundation.

Rutherford served as Senior Editor of the Journal of Vascular Surgery from 1996 to 2003. He also recognized the need for regular updates of topics for practicing vascular surgeons, which led to his developing and editing Seminars in Vascular Surgery from 1988 to 2012.

Rutherford published over 400 scientific articles and book chapters on a wide range of topics during his career.

== Honors and awards ==
Rutherford was a member of many professional societies and was the President of four, including the International Society for Cardiovascular Surgery, North American Chapter, and American Association for Vascular Surgery. In 2005, the Society of Vascular Surgery awarded him its Lifetime Achievement Award.

== Personal life ==
Rutherford was married to his wife Kay for 58 years. They had five children. One of their granddaughters died at the age of eight due to complications related to diabetic ketoacidosis. In the granddaughter’s memory, the Rutherfords established the Brandi Rutherford Memorial Fund to support an annual lectureship and research initiatives in vascular surgery at Johns Hopkins School of Medicine in hopes of furthering knowledge of the relationship between diabetes and peripheral vascular disease.
