= Paul Mayer (activist) =

Paul Mayer (1931–2013) was a German-born American peace activist. Mayer is best remembered as a leading radical pacifist of the 1960s and early 1970s, taking part in acts of civil disobedience in an effort to speed an end to the Vietnam War.

== Biography ==
=== Early years ===
Paul Michael Mayer was born February 24, 1931, in Frankfurt, Germany to Ernst and Bertha Mayer, ethnic Jews of German nationality. His father was a concert violinist who made ends meet working as his salesman, while his mother worked as a nurse.

Following the rise to power of Adolf Hitler and his Nazi party, repression rapidly engulfed Germany's Jewish population. As Jews Mayer and his younger brother were expelled from school by government edict, contributing to his parents' decision to emigrate to the United States in 1938. He spent a year living in an orphanage before his parents were financially able to obtain an apartment for the family in New York City.

Mayer converted from Judaism to Catholicism in 1947, at the age of 16, drawn to the church, he later recalled, by an "adolescent drive to belong." Aspiring to become a priest, Mayer joined a Benedictine monastery, where he lived for 18 years.

=== Political activism ===
Mayer was deeply affected by liberation theology in the Catholic church, with its emphasis upon aiding the poor by battling unjust economic, political, and social conditions.

On February 8, 1971, Mayer was indicted as a co-conspirator along with radical priests Philip Berrigan, Daniel Berrigan, and 10 others in an alleged plot to bomb the U.S. Capitol and kidnap Henry Kissinger, a top policy advisor to President Richard M. Nixon. Mayer acted as the head of the defense committee to support the defendants, who were known in the popular press of the day as the Harrisburg Seven. The defendants charged that the alleged plot was a fabrication constructed by the Federal Bureau of Investigation.

Shortly after the time of the indictment, Mayer sought to connect the Harrisburg Seven case with Nixon administration efforts to intimidate domestic opponents of the war. In a February 1971 interview with the Los Angeles Free Press Mayer said:

"People always ask what the meaning of the indictment is. I see it as a further attempt to stifle dissent. It also shows that the government is now ready to move from mere 'extreme' groups such as the Panthers and Weatherpeople to more moderate and nonviolent peace people. Dissent is no longer to be tolerated in any form, especially by people who by their involvement are determined to keep this war on the front, rather than the back pages of the newspaper.

"That's what the Administration is trying to do, to deceive the people into thinking the war is being wound down, whereas in reality it is being increasingly wound up....

"I think the indictments are an attempt to scare people off, or to frighten us off, and from there to scare off people in general. People are a lot more nervous these days. There's no question about that."

The trial of the 13 ended in a hung jury in 1972 and charges against Mayer were dismissed.

=== Later years ===
During his last years Mayer became involved with the Occupy Wall Street movement, expressing an affinity for its radical political ideology and anti-poverty efforts.

=== Death and legacy ===
Mayer died November 22, 2013, at his home in East Orange, New Jersey. He was 82 years old at the time of his death.
