= Leon Miękina =

Polish teacher, writer and translator

Leon Miękina (5 July 1930 – 4 November 2013) was a Polish teacher, writer and translator.

Born in Cieszyn, he graduated from Catholic University of Lublin in 1955. After that he became a teacher in secondary schools in Cieszyn. He is a member of Macierz Ziemi Cieszyńskiej. From 1981 to 1996 he was a chairman of this organization.

== Works ==
=== Poetry ===
- Szukając do-pełnienia (1980)
- Przez pryzmat trioletu (1983)

=== Non-fictional ===
- Karola Miarki związki z Cieszynem (1985)
- Prekursorzy (1988)
- Znów minie wiek... Antologia literatury nadolziańskiej (2001)
