= Diego Llopis =

Spanish footballer

Personal information
- Full name: Diego Llopis Caules
- Date of birth: 2 May 1929
- Place of birth: Ciutadella de Menorca, Spain
- Date of death: 11 November 2013 (aged 84)
- Place of death: Ciutadella de Menorca, Spain
- Position: Defender

Senior career*
Years	Team	Apps	(Gls)
- Mallorca
- * Club domestic league appearances and goals

Diego Llopis Caules (2 May 1929 – 11 November 2013) was a Spanish professional footballer who played as a defender.

== Career ==
Born in Ciutadella de Menorca, Llopis played for Mallorca.

== Later life and death ==
Llopis died in his native town on 11 November 2013 at the age of 84.
