= Bob Bentley (politician) =

Mayor of Barrie, Ontario
- In office 1967–1969
- Preceded by: Lester Cooke
- Succeeded by: Lester Cooke

Personal details
- Born: Robert Sidney Bentley; 1928 Toronto, Ontario, Canada
- Died: November 18, 2013 (aged 84–85)

Robert Sidney Bentley (1928 – November 18, 2013) was a Canadian politician, who served as mayor of Barrie, Ontario in 1968 and 1969.

Born in Toronto in 1928, Bentley worked in insurance before moving to Barrie to take an executive job with the local Formosa Springs brewery. He also hosted a weekly radio show, Briefly Bentley, on CKBB in the 1960s.

He ran for mayor, against incumbent Lester Cooke, in the 1967 election, and won. As mayor, he was most noted for creating a "student mayor" program to educate and involve youth in the political process. The city still runs the program to this day. Defeated by Cooke in 1969, he later rejoined Formosa Springs and was reelected to Barrie City Council as a councillor. He later moved to North Bay after accepting a provincial appointment to review provincial rent control legislation.

In retirement, Bentley moved to Mexico. In 2013, he was seriously injured in a vehicle accident there, and was taken back to Barrie's Royal Victoria Regional Health Centre, where he died on November 18 at age 84.
