= Carl Hilliard =

American journalist, reporter and columnist

- Born: Carl Hilliard; October 25, 1937; Gebo, Wyoming, United States
- Died: November 10, 2013 (aged 76); Commerce City, Colorado, United States
- Occupations: Journalist, reporter, columnist
- Years active: 1959–1999

Carl Hilliard (October 25, 1937 – November 10, 2013) was an American journalist, reporter and columnist.

Born in Gebo, Wyoming, he began working for the Missoulian in Montana and worked on the base newspaper while stationed in the army at the Fitzsimons Army Medical Center from 1960 to 1962. He worked for the Albuquerque Journal covering sports and general assignment news in 1963–64, and joined the Associated Press in November 1964 and worked in its bureau in Cheyenne, Wyoming.

He was assigned to cover politics and state government for the Associated Press in Denver in 1967 and retired in 1999.

Carl Hilliard died of heart attack on November 10, 2013, aged 76, in Commerce City, Colorado.
