= Hari Krishna Devsare =

Hindi-language writer (1938-2013)

- हरिकृष्ण देवसरे
- Born: 9 March 1938; Nagod, Madhya Pradesh
- Died: 14 November 2013 (aged 75); Indirapuram, Ghaziabad
- Spouse: Vibha Devsare
- Children: Shashank Devsare, Kshipra (Devsare) Bharti, Shashin Devsare

Hari Krishna Devsare (Hindi pronunciation: [ɦəri ˈkr̩ʂɳə d̪eʋsre]; 9 March 1938 – 14 November 2013) was a Hindi writer, known for his work in the field of children's literature. He received the first Vatsalya Award, instituted by Padma Binani Foundation, for his contribution to children's literature.

In the year 2011, he was honoured with Life Time Contribution Award in the field of Children's Literature by Sahitya Akademi, the Indian Academy of Letters.

Devsare was born on 9 March 1938 in Nagod, Madhya Pradesh.

== Work ==
Known for experimentation in his writings, Dr Devsare had launched a serious debate by questioning the relevance of the tales of kings and queens and fairies in the modern context. Instead, he has encouraged creativity in children's literature in Indian languages and tried to fill the vacuum in science fiction and one-act plays for children. With over 300 books for children to his credit, he has contributed a number of authentic and standard works in this category in Hindi. In addition, he has written scripts for serials, telefilms and programmes based on science and technology. Dr Devsare was a recipient of several awards and honours, including Bal Sahityakar Samman, Bal Sahitya Samman of Uttar Pradesh Hindi Sansthan, Kriti Samman (2001) and Sahityakar Samman (2004) of Hindi Akademi, Delhi.

Devsare worked for 22 years in All India Radio and after with voluntary retirement he started working with Parag magazine. He was the editor of Hindi magazine Parag. He wrote several books in Hindi in different genres, including mystery, adventure and science fiction.

== Death ==
Devsare died on 14 November 2013 in Indirapuram, Ghaziabad, Uttar Pradesh. Devsare is survived by his wife Vibha Devsare, two sons, a daughter and five grandchildren.

== Biographical Film ==
https://www.youtube.com/watch?v=vRfpsiAUT78
