= Joop Eversteijn =

Dutch footballer (1921–2013)

Personal information
- Full name: Jozef Petrus Eversteijn
- Date of birth: 29 January 1921
- Place of birth: The Hague, Netherlands
- Date of death: 2 November 2013 (aged 92)
- Place of death: The Hague, Netherlands
- Position: Centre forward

Senior career*
Years	Team	Apps	(Gls)
1938–1955	ADO		
- * Club domestic league appearances and goals

Joop Eversteijn (29 January 1921 – 2 November 2013) was a Dutch footballer who played as a centre forward, spending his entire career with ADO.

He won the 1942 and 1943 league title with the club. Eversteijn played for ADO during World War II when the club was regarded as collaborating with the German occupiers and won those only two league titles. Despite only player Gerrie Vreken was a member of the NSB, everyone who played for the club at the time had to defend himself for not being a collaborator.

Eversteijn was a member of the club's board from 1965 to 1977. As a coach, he was in charge of amateur side OLIVEO in the late 1950s and of Zwart Blauw from Kijkduin in the early 1960s.

== Personal life and death ==
Eversteijn played several years alongside his older brother Piet, who died in March 2017, aged 97.

He died on 2 November 2013, aged 92, in his hometown of The Hague, South Holland.
