= Qusai Emad Al-Khawaldeh =

Jordanian footballer

Personal information
- Full name: Qusai Emad Al-Khawaldeh
- Date of birth: 1994
- Place of birth: Amman, Jordan
- Date of death: 24 November 2013 (aged 19)
- Place of death: Amman, Jordan
- Position: Midfielder

Youth career
- Years: Team
- Al-Faisaly

Qusai Emad Al-Khawaldeh (1994 – 24 November 2013) was a Jordanian footballer, who primarily played as a midfielder.

Qusai Emad Al-Khawaldeh died of asphyxiation on 24 November 2013, aged 19, in his hometown of Amman.
