= Montgomery Kaluhiokalani =

American surfer (1958–2013)

Personal information
- Nickname: Buttons
- Born: Montgomery Ernest Thomas Kaluhiokalani; March 30, 1958 Honolulu, Hawaii, United States
- Died: November 2, 2013 (aged 55)
- Website: Official website

Surfing career
- Sport: Surfing

Montgomery Ernest Thomas Kaluhiokalani (March 30, 1958 – November 2, 2013) was a surfer from Hawaii, known as Buttons. He was an innovator of modern surfing maneuvers and was known for his switch foot surfing and for performing the first backside 360 in a major surf film. Surfer Magazine called him one of the most influential surfers of all time, and he has been described by Surfer Today as a "surf legend."

== Early life ==
Born Montgomery Ernest Thomas Kaluhiokalani in Honolulu, his father was an army serviceman and his mother was a bartender. When he was five, his mother moved with him and his two brothers to Waikiki, where his grandmother gave him his nickname, saying that the tight curls of his hair looked like "buttons" attached to his head.

== Career ==
Kaluhiokalani was active from the 1970s onwards. In 1973 he came second in the Boys' Division of the United States Surfing Championship. At the age of 21 he competed in the Pipeline Masters and Sunset World Cup. In 1979 he won the Malibu Pro; he also came third in the 1975 Pro Class Trials, third in the 1981 Pro Class Trials, third in the 1981 Pipeline Masters, and first in the 1981 Peru International.

== Drug problems ==
In 2009, Buttons described himself as a "recovering drug addict" who had been sober for three years. His drug problems began in 1985 with cocaine; he returned to surfing in 1996 but was arrested in 1998, although charges were later dropped. In 2007 he featured on the TV show Dog the Bounty Hunter after being arrested for drug offenses. He recovered from his drug problems and started his own surf school on Oahu's North Shore. Buttons also gave lessons to the disabled and made multiple PSA videos encouraging adults and youth alike to stay off of drugs.

== Personal life ==
Buttons was named after actor Montgomery Clift.

He had 8 children and 9 grandchildren.

Kaluhiokalani died on November 2, 2013, due to complications from lung cancer. He was 55 years old.

A memorial service was held at Kapiolani Park in Waikiki on November 29, 2013. This was followed by a 'paddle out' of more than 100 surfers and their boards, from the adjacent beach to the waters where Buttons had practiced his craft.
