= Rudolf Lorenzen =

German novelist

Rudolf Lorenzen (5 February 1922 – 27 November 2013) was a German novelist.

Lorenzen was born in Lübeck. His best-known work, Anything But A Hero (Alles andere als ein Held), is about an ordinary German boy who grows up in pre-war Germany, serves in the German army during WWII and finds his way in the shipping business afterwards. He also wrote the short story "The Expedition", which takes place in the future, when a voyage begins to the furthest known planet in the Solar System, Cerberus.

Lorenzen died in Berlin, aged 91.
