= Ian Roy MacLennan =

Canadian architect and pilot

Ian MacLennan KG, OM, CH, TD, DL, FRS, RA
- Born: 4 April 1919; Regina, Saskatchewan, Canada
- Died: 6 November 2013 (aged 94); White Rock, British Columbia, Canada
- Spouse: Nina (née Barry)
- Military career
- Allegiance: British Empire
- Branch: Royal Air Force; Royal Canadian Air Force
- Service years: 1940–1945
- Rank: Flight Lieutenant
- Conflicts: World War II
- Awards: Distinguished Flying Medal
- Other work: Architect

Ian Roy MacLennan DFM, FRAIC, MTPIC, RCAF (4 April 1919 – 6 November 2013), was a Canadian fighter pilot and flying ace during the Second World War who later became a successful architect.

== Early life ==
Born in Regina, Saskatchewan, Canada, with six siblings, Ian MacLennan was schooled in Gull Lake, Saskatchewan. He studied engineering at Saskatchewan University.

== Second World War ==
MacLennan was enlisted into the RCAF in October 1940. Following training, he graduated from training school in June 1941, arriving in England during that Summer.

=== Malta ===
After service in Britain, flying sorties over France, in 1942 the RAF asked for desperately-needed volunteers (and their even more needed aircraft) to fight against Axis forces during the Siege of Malta. After damaging two Spitfires in an accident, MacLennan had fallen out of favor with his commanding officer and was asked to volunteer to go. On 9 June 1942, 32 pilots, MacLennan among them, headed towards Malta on board the aircraft carrier HMS Eagle. Roughly 1000 km (621 miles) from the island, the Spitfires were launched, attempting to fly through a hotbed of Axis aircraft and warships. After a four-hour flight, they landed, with little fuel left. Immediately, Malta-based pilots took over the aircraft, defending against a Luftwaffe attack.

MacLennan flew with No. 1435 Squadron, based at RAF Luqa and formed a good relationship with Canadian aces Squadron Leader Tony Lovell and Flight Lieutenant Henry Wallace McLeod; Lovell witnessed his first victory. MacLennan impressed his superiors with his gunnery skills and was promoted directly from flight sergeant to flight lieutenant and given command of "A" flight. During his time on Malta, MacLennan shot down seven enemy aircraft, becoming an ace.

On Malta, he also met George Beurling, the highest-scoring Canadian pilot of the Second World War, whom he highly regarded. However, the two never flew together.

=== Capture and escape ===
After the siege ended, MacLennan returned home for a period of rest. During D-Day, on 7 June 1944, his Spitfire crash-landed in enemy territory whilst supporting the allied landings. Captured, he was sent to Stalag Luft III, where he subsequently escaped in 1945, as the war was drawing to a close.

== Postwar career ==
In 1945 MacLennan returned to Canada, studying at University of Toronto, where he was mentored by renowned Canadian architect Eric Arthur. A primary focus of his career in architecture was on producing affordable housing. His role took him to Venezuela, the United States and eventually back to his homeland of Canada. In 1961, he was made a Fellow of the Royal Architectural Institute of Canada, one of the youngest to be elected.
Moshe Safdie, famed designer of Habitat 67 said of him:

Ian Maclennan is one of those men who make Canada tick. Without him there would never have been a Habitat. He charges into meetings with the fervor of a college debating champion….he is aggressive, frank, and unlike many civil servants, very outspoken.

MacLennan appeared in two television documentaries, chronicling the Siege of Malta and the role played by Canadian Air Aces during the War.

=== Death ===
Ian MacLennan's wife of 67 years, London-born Nina Olive MacLennan (née Barry) who was "familiar with the Bible as with Shakespeare" died on 17 May 2013, aged 97. He himself died on 6 November 2013, survived by his two children.
