= Dino Gifford =

Italian footballer (1917–2013)

Personal information
- Date of birth: 6 January 1917
- Place of birth: Livorno, Italy
- Date of death: 5 November 2013 (aged 96)
- Height: 1.77 m (5 ft 9 1/2 in)
- Position: Midfielder

Senior career*
Years	Team	Apps	(Gls)
1936–1937	Viareggio	23	(1)
1937–1938	Livorno	4	(0)
1938–1939	Modena	13	(0)
1939–1940	Molinella	10	(0)
1940–1941	Le Signe	11	(0)
1941–1942	L'Aquila Calcio	0	(0)
Total		61	(5)
- * Club domestic league appearances and goals

Dino Gifford (6 January 1917 – 5 November 2013) was an Italian professional footballer who played as a midfielder for Viareggio, Livorno, Modena, Molinella, Le Signe and L'Aquila Calcio.
