= Morton Yolkut =

American rabbi

Morton F. Yolkut
- Born: 1943; St. Louis, Missouri
- Died: 11 November 2013 (aged 70); Philadelphia, Pennsylvania
- Resting place: Beit Shemesh, Jerusalem, Israel
- Occupation: Rabbi
- Spouse: Aline Schlesinger

Morton F. Yolkut (1943–2013) was a nationally renowned rabbi who served Jewish congregations in three American cities, Chicago, Illinois; Southfield, Michigan; and Philadelphia, Pennsylvania. He represented the American Jewish community at a meeting in 2003 with President George W. Bush and was the Jewish rabbi at the traditional Presidential Inaugural Prayer Service at Washington National Cathedral the day after President Bush's second inauguration, 21 January 2005.

He was a published author with a regular column in Detroit Jewish News and a leader in many national organizations of rabbis and of Orthodox Judaism.

== Birthplace and education ==
Yolkut was born in St. Louis, Missouri. He received his rabbinical degree from Hebrew Theological College of Skokie, Illinois. He also earned degrees of Bachelor of Arts cum laude from Roosevelt University in Chicago and Master of Arts in American history from Northwestern University in Evanston, Illinois.

== First pulpit ==
Yolkut's first pulpit was Congregation Anshe Kanasses Israel in Chicago. The congregation eventually merged with another congregation, and the original historic building was demolished.

== Second pulpit ==
From Chicago, Yolkut moved to Michigan to serve as rabbi at Congregation B'nai David in Southfield for 18 years. He became a widely known Jewish leader in Michigan, serving as vice president of the Michigan Board of Rabbis and Orthodox columnist for Detroit Jewish News, a statewide newspaper. His ministry extended beyond preaching, as he served on the Chaplaincy Commission at Sinai Hospital in Detroit and presented papers on Jewish medical ethics to doctors and staff at local hospitals and conferences. One aspect of Jewish medical ethics is that Judaism supports the nearly absolute sanctity of life.

== Third pulpit ==
In Yolkut's final pulpit, from 1995 to his retirement in 2008, he was rabbi of Shaare Shamayim-Beth Judah in Northeast Philadelphia.

In addition to his rabbinical responsibilities, he presided over his congregation's attempt to break the world record for dreidels spinning in unison for 10 seconds. According to an article in Jewish Exponent on 21 December 2006, "This was the third time Shaare Shamayim made headlines for attempting to break records in recent years. In 2002, the synagogue successfully baked the world's largest hamantashen, which measured 20 feet on each side ... In October 2005, Shaare Shamayim teamed up with Gratz College in Elkins Park to make up the largest number of people -- exactly 400 -- blowing a shofar at same time ... Yolkut said that he's proud ... that so many people came together at a time when many synagogues in the area are closing ... 'We've had some mergers with other congregations. They have brought their members and their vitality with them, so all in all, the state of our synagogue is in good shape at this point,' he said."

== National Jewish leader ==
Yolkut served many national organizations, including Rabbinical Council of America, Federation of Traditional Rabbis, and national Rabbinic Cabinets of State of Israel Bonds, United Jewish Appeal, ORT America (formerly Organization for Educational Resources and Technological Training), and Jewish National Fund.

== Honored on the floor of Congress ==
When Yolkut became rabbi of Shaare Shamayim, U.S. Rep. Robert Borski (D., Pa.) honored him with a speech to the U.S. House of Representatives, covered by C-SPAN.

== Meetings with President George W. Bush ==
Yolkut was one of the rabbis who met with President George W. Bush at the White House in 2003 and was the Jewish rabbi at the traditional Presidential Inaugural Prayer Service at Washington National Cathedral the day after President Bush's second inauguration, 21 January 2005.

== Post-retirement ==
After retirement, Yolkut taught at Temple University in Philadelphia for two years.

== Family ==
While serving in Chicago, he married Aline Schlesinger, now a researcher at Educational Testing Services.

Schlesinger is the daughter of two Holocaust survivors who were both rescued by Oskar Schindler. Her mother, Margot (Wind) Schlesinger is incorrectly listed as "Hania Schlesinger" (List 2, Line 233), and her father Charles "Chaskel" Schlesinger is listed by his Hebrew name, "Abraham Schlesinger." (List 1, Line 37) on Schindler's List. Aline's uncle was noted German-Israeli-American artist Willie Wind.

Yolkut is survived by his wife Aline; his two sons Daniel Yolkut, the rabbi of Congregation Poale Zedeck in Pittsburgh, Pennsylvania and David, an attorney in Teaneck, New Jersey; and ten grandchildren.
