= Kevin A. Gilroy =

American air force officer (1936–2013)

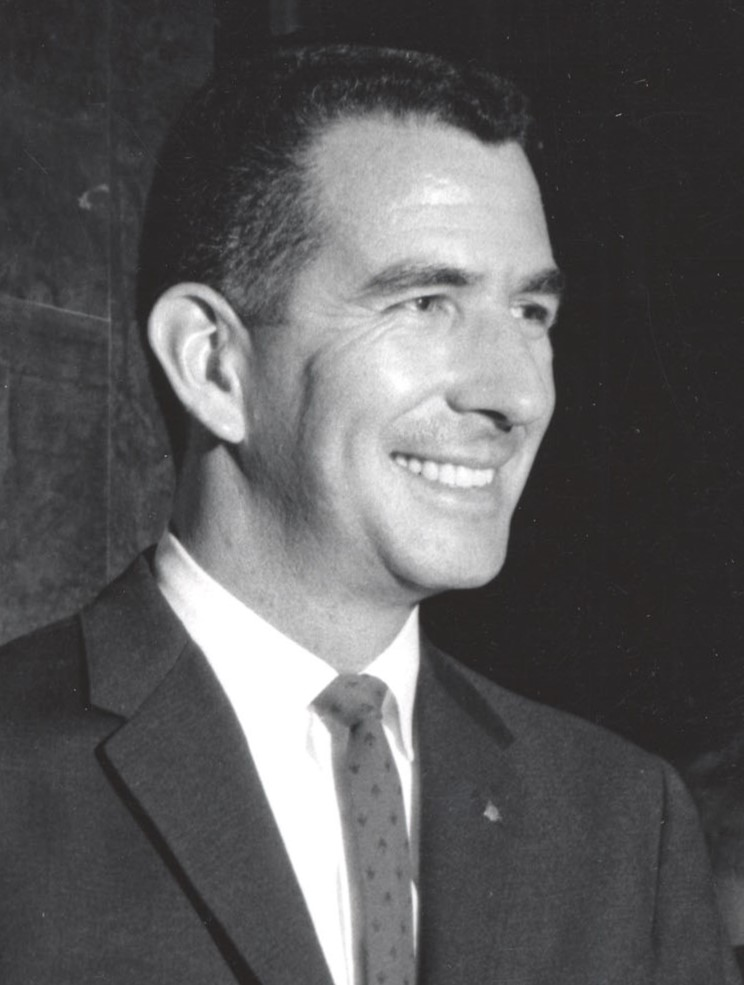
- Gilroy in 1967
- Born: Kevin Alfred Gilroy; June 4, 1936; Menlo Park, California, U.S.
- Died: November 13, 2013 (aged 77); Spring Branch, Texas, U.S.
- Burial place: St. Mary Cemetery, Gilroy, California
- Military career
- Allegiance: United States
- Branch: United States Air Force
- Service years: 1953–1987
- Rank: Colonel
- Nickname: Mike
- Units: 9th Bomb Squadron, 7th Bombardment Wing; 354th Tactical Fighter Squadron, 355th Tactical Fighter Wing
- Commands: Detachment 100, United States Logistics Group; Air Force Electronic Warfare Center
- Conflicts: Vietnam War
- Awards: Air Force Cross; Silver Star; Legion of Merit; Distinguished Flying Cross (3); Purple Heart; Defense Meritorious Service Medal; Meritorious Service Medal (3); Air Medal (11)

Kevin Alfred Gilroy (June 4, 1936 – November 13, 2013) was a United States Air Force (USAF) colonel and was one of the most highly decorated Electronic Warfare Officers in the USAF. After his retirement from the Air Force, he served as the mayor of the city of Gilroy.

== Early life ==
Gilroy was born on June 4, 1936, to Henry and Margaret Gilroy, in Menlo Park, California. He attended a seminary with the intention of becoming a priest before deciding to enlist in the U.S. Air Force.

== Military career ==
On December 11, 1953, he enlisted in the U.S. Air Force and was trained as a jet engine mechanic. He served as a jet engine mechanic for Convair B-36 Peacemaker and Boeing B-47 Stratojet aircraft. From December 1957 to March 1958, he left active duty briefly and served in the Air Force Reserve.

In June 1960, Gilroy entered the Air Force Officer Training School at Lackland Air Force Base in Texas and in September 1960, he was commissioned as second lieutenant. Following his commission he underwent Undergraduate Navigator Training at Harlingen Air Force Base in Texas, and was awarded his Navigator Wings in August 1961. He then attended Electronic Warfare Officer (EWO) Training and Boeing B-52 Stratofortress Combat Crew Training. In August 1962, he was assigned to the 9th Bomb Squadron at Carswell Air Force Base in Texas.

=== Vietnam war ===
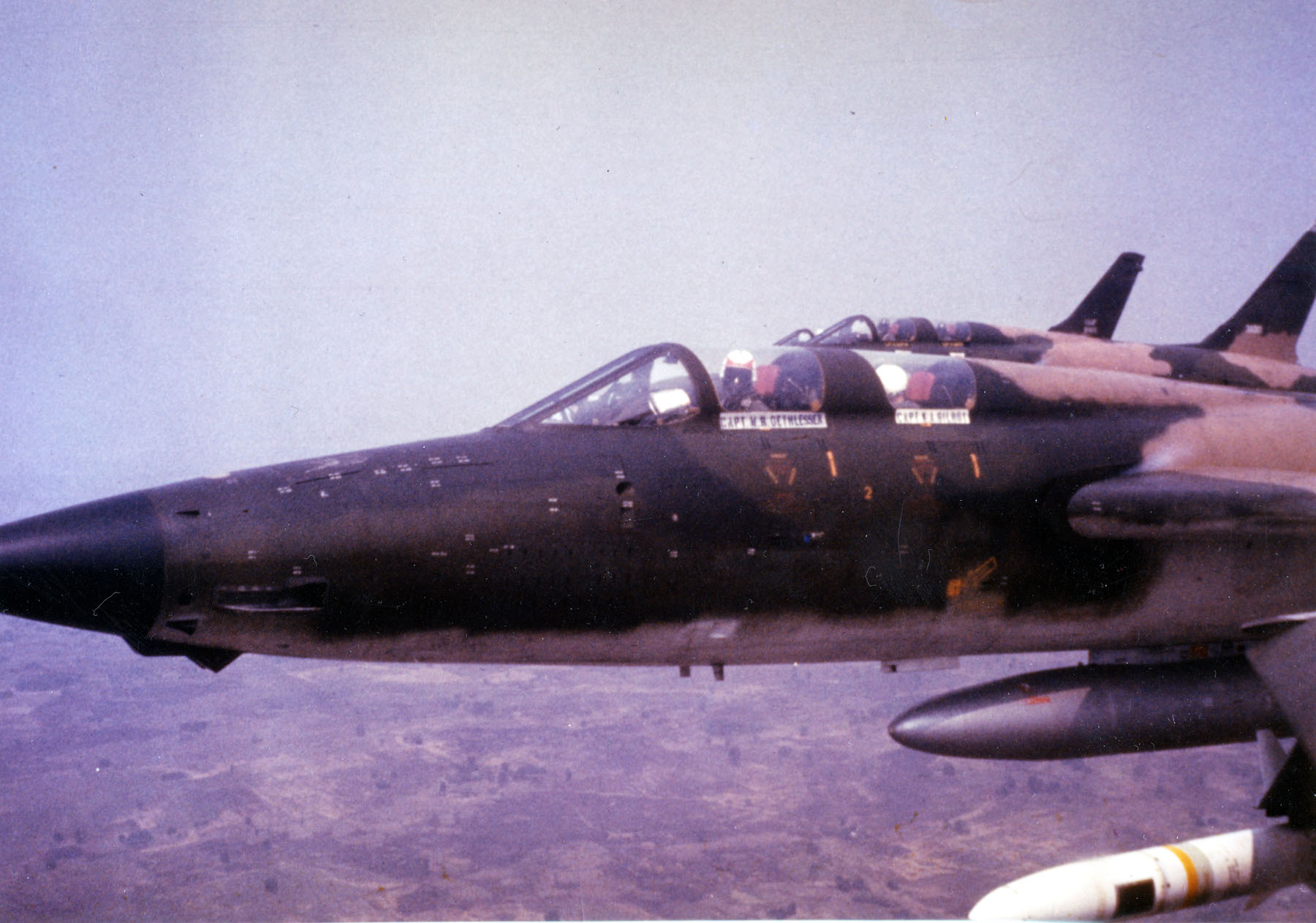
Capts. Dethlefsen and Gilroy in their F-105F in April 1967

From May to November 1965, during the Vietnam War, the 9th BS was deployed to Andersen Air Force Base in Guam in support of Operation Arc Light missions. During this time, Gilroy flew 19 combat missions as an EWO in B-52s between June and November 1965.

Following his return to the United States, he underwent F-105 Thunderchief Combat Crew and Wild Weasel training, and was assigned as an F-105F Thunderchief EWO with the 354th Tactical Fighter Squadron at Takhli Royal Thai Air Force Base in Thailand, in July 1966. On August 7, 1966, he participated in a mission to destroy surface-to-air missile (SAM) installations near military targets in Hanoi, North Vietnam. Despite extremely hazardous conditions, Gilroy directed his F-105F in attacking the SAM installations. For actions in the mission, he received the Silver Star.

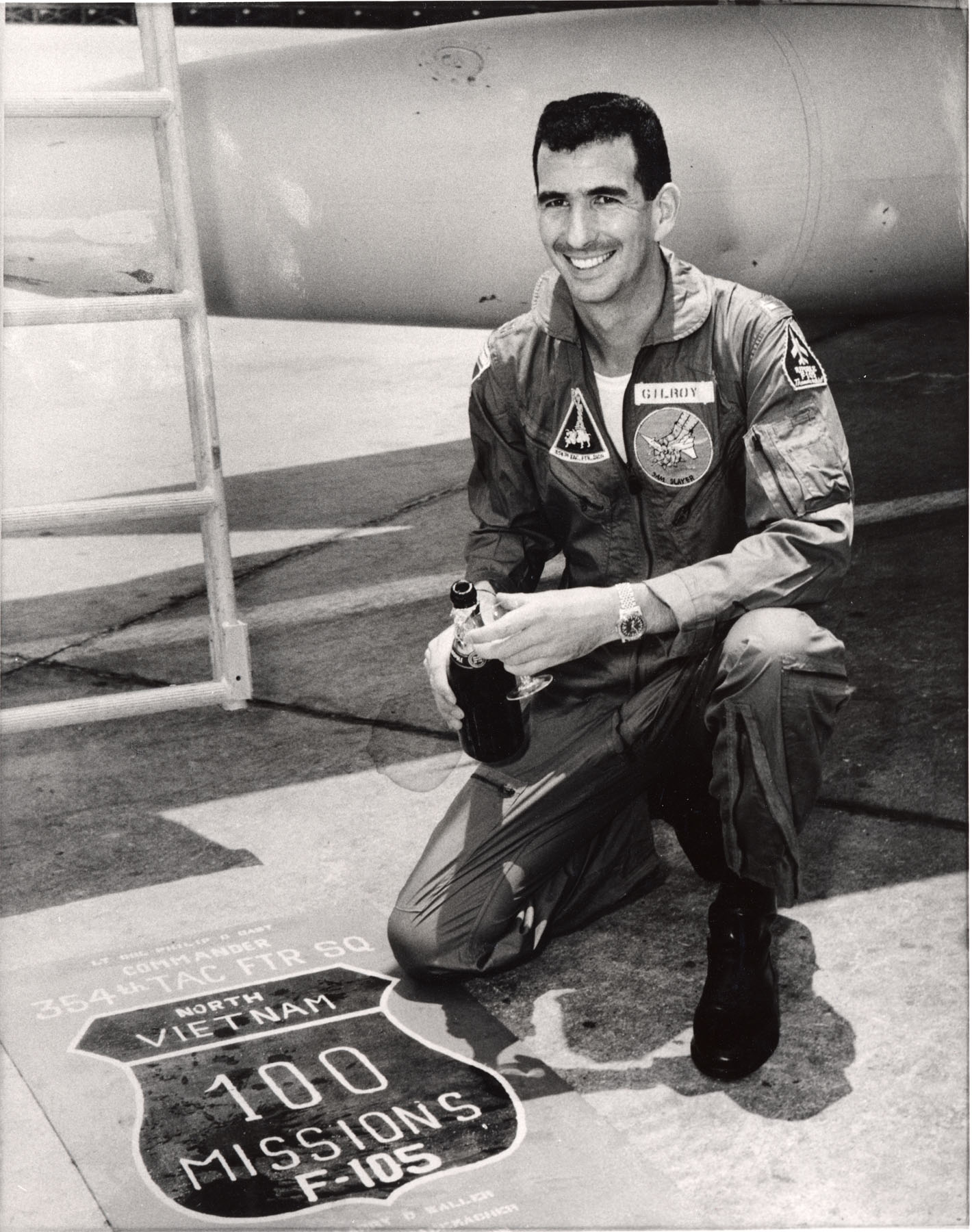
Gilroy after completing 100 missions over North Vietnam

While flying his 11th combat mission, his F-105F was severely damaged by anti-aircraft fire causing both his pilot and him to bail out over the Gulf of Tonkin. After being rescued, he continued fly missions from March 10, 1967. On that day, Gilroy and his pilot Merlyn Dethlefsen flew a pre-strike missile suppression mission of the SAM site protecting the iron and steel works in Thái Nguyên, North Vietnam. Gilroy provided guidance to Dethlefsen in attacking the SAM site. Despite the loss of their flight leader and another aircraft in their flight, Gilroy and Dethlefsen managed to destroy the SAM site. Although their aircraft had suffered extensive battle damage and was under constant attack by North Vietnamese MiG interceptors and anti-aircraft fire, the strike force were successfully able to destroy the target. For their heroism in this mission, Gilroy received the Air Force Cross and Dethlefsen was awarded the Medal of Honor.

Gilroy flew a total of 100 Wild Weasel missions in the F-105F during the war.

=== Post war ===
After his return to the United States in June 1967, he was assigned as a Wild Weasel EWO Instructor at Nellis Air Force Base in Nevada. He continued to serve as an EWO on the McDonnell Douglas F-4 Phantom II and General Dynamics F-111 Aardvark. From January to February 1968, he was deployed to South Korea in response to the Pueblo incident. Gilroy attended the Air Command and Staff College at Maxwell Air Force Base in Alabama, from August 1969 to July 1970. Following this, Gilroy served in a variety of positions, including commander of a military logistics division in Eskisehir, Turkey, from June 1973 to May 1974, commander of the Air Force Electronic Warfare Center from July 1980 to July 1983 and chairman of the NATO Electronic Warfare Advisory Committee in Brussels, Belgium, from July 1984 until his retirement from the Air Force on February 1, 1987. Upon his retirement, the Air Force Electronic Warfare Officers School named its top class graduate award after Gilroy.

== Later life ==
In 1991, Gilroy was elected into the city council of Gilroy, California, a city founded by his great-great-grandfather John Gilroy. In 1997, he was elected as the mayor of the city. During his tenure as the mayor of Gilroy, he oversaw the creation of the city's downtown development corporation and led numerous efforts against gang violence. He served as mayor until 1999.

Following his retirement from political life, Gilroy and his family moved to Gulf Breeze, Florida before finally settling in Spring Branch, Texas. He died on November 13, 2013, and was buried with full military honors at St. Mary Cemetery in Gilroy.

== Personal life ==
Gilroy was married twice and had a son and daughter, and several grand and great-grandchildren.

== Military decorations ==
During his lengthy career, Gilroy earned many decorations, including:

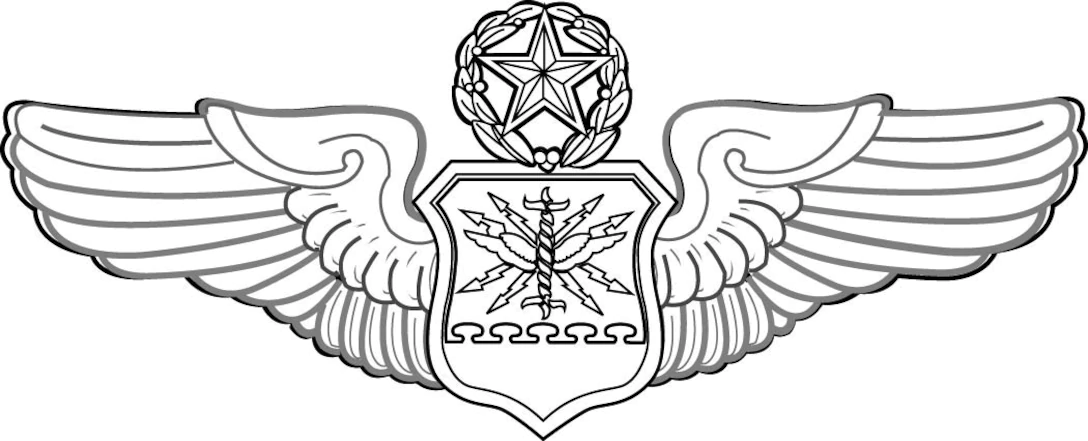

United States Air Force Master Navigator badge
Air Force Cross
Silver Star	Legion of Merit	Distinguished Flying Cross with two bronze oak leaf clusters
Purple Heart	Defense Meritorious Service Medal	Meritorious Service Medal with two bronze oak leaf clusters
Air Medal with two silver oak leaf clusters	Air Force Commendation Medal with two bronze oak leaf clusters	Air Force Presidential Unit Citation
Air Force Outstanding Unit Award with Valor device and three bronze oak leaf clusters	Air Force Organizational Excellence Award	Combat Readiness Medal
Army Good Conduct Medal	National Defense Service Medal with service star	Armed Forces Expeditionary Medal
Vietnam Service Medal with three bronze campaign stars	Korea Defense Service Medal	Air Force Overseas Short Tour Service Ribbon with bronze oak leaf cluster
Air Force Overseas Long Tour Service Ribbon	Air Force Longevity Service Award with one silver and two bronze oak leaf clusters	Small Arms Expert Marksmanship Ribbon
Air Force Training Ribbon	Vietnam Gallantry Cross Unit Citation	Vietnam Campaign Medal

=== Air Force Cross citation ===

==== Citation ====
The President of the United States of America, authorized by Title 10, Section 8742, United States Code, presents the Air Force Cross to Captain Kevin Alfred Gilroy, United States Air Force, "for extraordinary heroism while serving as Electronics Warfare Officer of an F-105 aircraft of the with the 354th Tactical Fighter Squadron, 355th Tactical Fighter Wing, Takhli Royal Thai Air Base, engaged in a pre-strike, missile suppression mission against the Thai Nguyen Steel Works in North Vietnam on March 10, 1967." On that date, Captain Gilroy guided his pilot in attacking and destroying a surface-to-air missile installation protecting one of the most important industrial complexes in North Vietnam. He accomplished this feat even after formidable hostile defenses had destroyed the lead aircraft and had crippled a second. Though his own aircraft suffered extensive battle damage and was under constant attack by MiG interceptors, anti-aircraft artillery, automatic weapons, and small arms fire, Captain Gilroy aligned several ingenious close range attacks on the hostile defenses at great risk to his own life. Due to his technical skill, the attacks were successful and the strike force was able to bomb the target without loss. Through his extraordinary heroism, superb airmanship and aggressiveness, Captain Gilroy has reflected the highest credit upon himself and the United States Air Force.
