= Mohan Rai =

Indian cricketer (1933–2013)

Personal information
- Born: 1933
- Died: 4 November 2013 (aged 79–80); Mangalore, India
- Source: ESPNcricinfo, 27 May 2016

Mohan Rai (1933 – 4 November 2013) was an Indian cricketer. He played 24 first-class matches for Madras between 1955 and 1963.
