= Lounis Matem =

Algerian footballer (1941–2013)

Personal information
- Date of birth: c. 1941
- Place of birth: Sétif, Sétif Province, Algeria
- Date of death: 5 November 2013 (aged 71–72)
- Place of death: Sétif, Sétif Province, Algeria
- Positions: Midfielder; forward

International career
Years	Team	Apps	(Gls)
1964–1965	Algeria	2	(0)

Lounis Matem (c. 1941 – 5 November 2013), also known as Lounis Mattem, was an Algerian footballer, who primarily played as a midfielder or a forward.

== Death ==
Matem died on 5 November 2013, aged 71 or 72, in his hometown of Sétif, Sétif Province.
