= Max Georg von Twickel =

German Catholic bishop (1926–2013)

Coat of arms of Max Georg von Twickel

Max Georg von Twickel (22 August 1926 – 28 November 2013) was a German Catholic bishop.

Born at Havixbeck, von Twickel was ordained in 1952 for the Roman Catholic Diocese of Munster. He was also named titular bishop of Lugura and auxiliary bishop of the Munster Diocese in 1973; he retired in 2001.
