= Ljubomir Vračarević =

Serbian aikidoka (1947–2013)

- Born: 6 May 1947; Varaždin, PR Croatia, FPR Yugoslavia
- Died: 18 November 2013 (aged 66); Belgrade, Serbia
- Style: Real Aikido
- Rank: 10th dan, Sōke

Other information
- Notable students: Bratislav Stajić, Radojica Spasović, Dragoljub Noveski, Nenad Veselinović, Vladimir Vokić, Dragan Stanković i Mihailo Lakić, Ljubiša Golubović.

Ljubomir Vračarević (Serbian Cyrillic: Љубомир Врачаревић; 6 May 1947 – 18 November 2013), was a Serbian martial artist and founder of Real Aikido.

== Biography ==
Ljubomir Vračarević studied aikido since 1971. During his first visit in Japan he was practicing in Hombu Dojo with Kisshomaru Ueshiba, the son of the founder of Aikido, Morihei Ueshiba.

During his second stay in Tokyo in 1993 at Yoshinkan, the school of Gozo Shioda, he met with Shioda, who rarely received visitors because of his age.

So far in his bodyguard instruction career, Vračarević held more than 150 seminars worldwide. Clubs of Real Aikido were host to more than 120,000 students.

His special area of teaching was the Real Aikido school for kids. He worked with kids aged 5 to 12 through a program called “With play to Master”, which is adjusted to children's physical and mental needs. Real Aikido is included in Serbian elementary school curriculum from 2005 as elective subject.

Vračarević was the author of 12 books and videos dealing with Real Aikido and self-defense. The books are written in Serbian, while some of them were translated to Russian or English. These include: “Defense From Knife”, “Aikido-Judo”, “Defense Without Fear” (self-defense for women), “I Was Training The Bodyguards”, ”Real Aikido”, “From Beginner to Master”, “Licence for Trainer”, and “Knife, Gun, Stick Techniques”.

Vračarević was an honour member of MAA, an international association of combat skills with headquarters in Germany, technical director of Real Aikido at Odbrana worldwide organization and the founder and president of World Centre of Real Aikido and European Martial Arts Hall of Fame.

Vračarević was an instructor in IBSSA, the International Bodyguard & Security Association. He was also a college professor for sport trainers in Belgrade.

In August 2002 the United States Martial Arts Association elected Vračarević to its Hall of Fame and awarded him the title Grandmaster, black belt 10th dan, Sōke. This award is not recognized by any of the mainstream aikido organizations such as Aikikai and Yoshinkan.

He appeared as actor with small roles in movies Kako je propao rokenrol where he played ninja instructor and Šejtanov ratnik (Devil's warrior) in which he appeared as himself.
