= Mitsuo Komatsubara =

Japanese professional golfer (1920–2013)

Mitsuo Komatsubara (小松原 三夫, Komatsubara Mitsuo; 1920 – 2 November 2013) was a Japanese professional golfer who was also known as a golf propagator in magazines and on TV.

He got his pro licence in 1955. In the 1970s and 1980s he had his own TV show called Komatsubara Mitsuo no gorufu dōjō ("Komatsubara Mitsuo's golf workshop") on TV Tokyo. He was involved in designing the Yatsugatake Plateau Country Club, Nagano Prefecture.

He was active as a pro coach as late as 2011, when he was 91 years old.

He died on 2 November 2013, from heart failure.
