= Geo Costiniu =

Romanian actor

- Born: Constantin Geo Costiniu; 23 April 1950; Bucharest, Romanian People's Republic
- Died: 12 November 2013 (aged 63); Bucharest, Romania
- Occupation: Film actor
- Years active: 1972–95

Geo Costiniu (23 April 1950, Bucharest – 12 November 2013) was a Romanian film actor.

Born in Bucharest, he died in the same city.

== Filmography ==
Year	Title	Role	Notes
1973	Parasutistii	Stefan Iuga	
1974	Nemuritorii	Young Officer	
1978	Septembrie	Vali Abrudan	
1979	Ciocolata cu alune	Ganaega	
1979	Ora zero		
1986	Un oaspete la cina	Traistaru	
1987	Sa-ti vorbesc despre mine		
1987	Niste baieti grozavi	Rexona	
1989	De ce are vulpea coada?	Tatal	
1989	Întâmplãri cu Alexandra	Radu Stoica	
1993	Patul conjugal		
1994	Neînvinsa-i dragostea	Aurica Capatâna	(final film role)
