= Peter Frank (academic) =

Peter John Frank (6 May 1934 - 14 November 2013) was a professor of Russian politics in the Department of Government at the University of Essex and a media commentator on Russian affairs.

He was born in Whitby, Yorkshire and after leaving school in 1950 did national service in the Army where he learned the Russian language. He then trained as a teacher and did post-graduate work at the University of Leeds, before becoming a lecturer at the University of Essex in 1968. He was known for his television appearances on Channel 4 News as an expert on the Soviet Union and Eastern Europe. He also contributed to BBC News 24, BBC World Service, BBC Radio 5 Live and independent radio stations.

After his retirement as a professor he was a Professorial Research Fellow at the University of Essex and wrote a biography of Joseph Richard Bagshawe, the founding secretary of the Staithes group of painters.

== Work ==
- The Soviet Communist Party Ronald J. Hill, Peter Frank. Boston : Allen & Unwin, 1986.
- Yorkshire Fisherfolk: A Social history of the Yorkshire inshore fishing community by Peter Frank, Phillimore & Co. Ltd., 2002, ISBN 1-86077-207-2
- Sea Painter: The Life and Work of J.R. Bagshawe, Marine Artist by Peter Frank, Phillimore & Co. Ltd., 2010, ISBN 978-1-86077-617-5
