= Real Aikido =

Hybrid Japanese Martial Art

- Focus: Hybrid
- Country of origin: Serbia
- Creator: Ljubomir Vračarević
- Parenthood: Aikido and also some kicks delivered from different countries from Asia.
- Olympic sport: No
- Official website: WCRA

Real Aikido (Serbian: Реални аикидо, Realni aikido) is a martial art developed by Ljubomir Vračarević, a self-defence instructor from Serbia. It is a mixture of aikido, judo and jujutsu techniques, with some modifications made by Vračarević.

== Techniques ==
The Real Aikido defense system includes unarmed techniques, as well as defense against weapons such as knife, pistol, etc. It includes of aikido, judo and jujutsu, techniques simplified so that they can be easily taught in security and self-defense courses. The curriculum itself is mainly based on a general aikido curriculum, with a Kyū/dan system of grading. Apart from grappling, self-defense against strikes also includes evasion and some blocking techniques.

== Bodyguard school ==
Vračarević's bodyguard school is officially certified by the International Bodyguard and Security Services Association (IBSSA).

== International recognition ==
- In 2001, Vladimir Đorđevic, chief instructor of United States Center of Real Aikido and founder of Odbrana was recognized by United States Martial Arts Association.
- In 2003, Real Aikido was recognized by United States Martial Arts Hall of Fame
- In 2005 CBS 2 Chicago TV Station aired the Chief Instructor Vladimir V. Đorđević at United States Center Of Real Aikido, on Rape Prevention issues.
- In October 2007 Real Aikido practitioners entered the first European Martial Arts Hall of Fame.
- The United States Center of Real Aikido is member of International Combat Martial Arts Unions Association.

== Ranks and grades ==
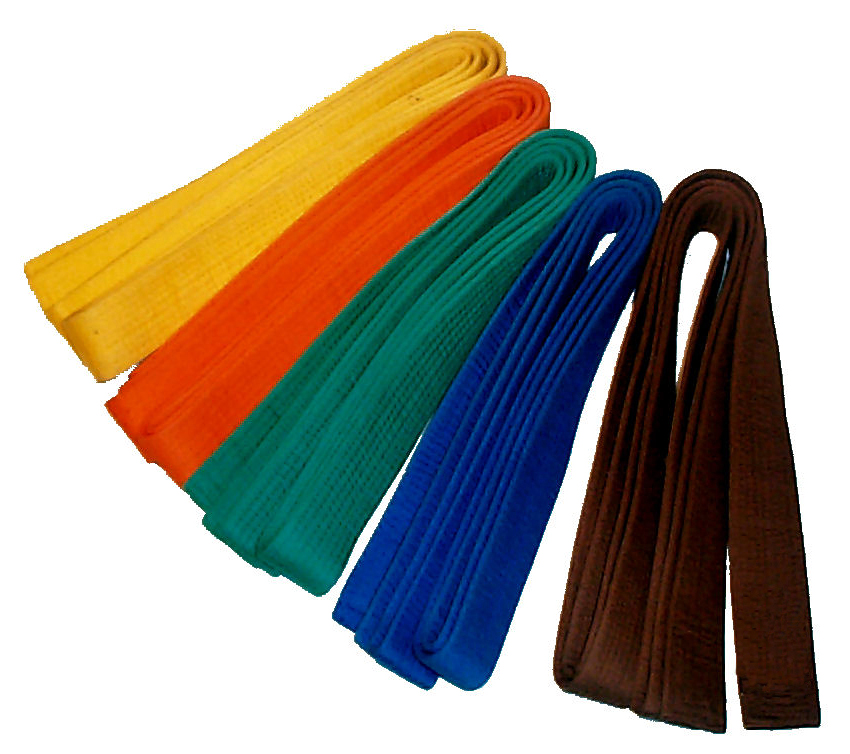
The style of belt commonly worn in Real Aikido

Yellow	5th kyū
Orange	4th kyū
Green	3rd kyū
Blue	2nd kyū
Brown	1st kyū
Black	dan
