= Franco Selleri =

Italian physicist (1936–2013)

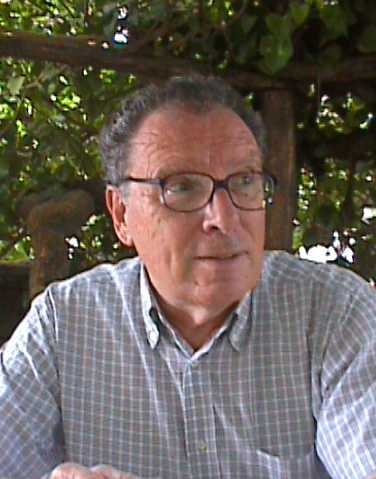
Franco Selleri

Franco Selleri (Bologna, Italy, 9 October 1936 – 20 November 2013) was an Italian theoretical physicist and professor at the Università degli Studi di Bari Aldo Moro. He received his Doctorate / Ph.D. cum laude at the Università di Bologna in 1958, and was a fellow of the Istituto Nazionale di Fisica Nucleare beginning 1959. He was a member of the New York Academy of Sciences and the Fondation Louis de Broglie, and served on the board of directors of the Italian Physical Society.

He is known for his analysis of the foundations of relativity theory and quantum mechanics. Several solutions have been proposed for the paradoxes pointed out by him. Philosophically, his position was that of a realist. He was in close contact with Karl Popper who, though very old, took part in a conference on the subject that Selleri organized in 1985 in Bari.

He had numerous visiting professorships and fellowships, including CERN, Saclay, the University of Nebraska–Lincoln, Cornell University, and Dubna. Also, he was the recipient of a medal from Gdanskie Towarzystwo Naukowe (Poland). During his scientific career, he published more than 200 papers in particle physics, quantum theory, relativity and history and philosophy of physics. He was the author of numerous books and editor of numerous conference proceedings on topics relating to the foundations of physics.

== Books ==
- 2009 – Weak Relativity: The Physics of Space and Time Without Paradoxes
- 2007 – Controlled Nucleosynthesis: Breakthroughs in Experiment and Theory, ISBN 1-4020-5873-X, ISBN 978-1-4020-5873-8
- 2003 – Lezioni di relatività: da Einstein all'etere di Lorentz, ISBN 88-88550-12-7
- 2002 – La Natura del Tempo: Propagazioni super-luminali, paradosso dei gemelli, teletrasporto (The Nature of Time), ISBN 978-88-220-6251-2
- 1998 – Einstein, Podolsky, and Rosen Paradox in Atomic, Nuclear, and Particle Physics, ISBN 978-0-306-42739-8
- 1998 – Open Questions in Relativistic Physics, ISBN 0-9683689-1-3, ISBN 978-0-9683689-1-6
- 1995 – Advances in Fundamental Physics, ISBN 0306441632, ISBN 978-0306441639
- 1993 – Fundamental Questions in Quantum Physics and Relativity: Collected Papers in Honor of Louis de Broglie, ISBN 0911767835, ISBN 978-0911767834
- 1992 – Wave-Particle Duality, ISBN 0306441632, ISBN 978-0306441639
- 1990 – Quantum Paradoxes and Physical Reality, with Alwy van der Merwe, ISBN 9780792302537
- 1989 – Fisica Senza Dogma (Physics without Dogma), ISBN 978-8822060891
- 1988 – Quantum Mechanics versus Local Realism: The Einstein-Podolsky-Rosen Paradox (Physics of Atoms and Molecules), ISBN 0306427397
- 1983/1990 – Die Debatte um die Quantentheorie (The Debate on Quantum Theory), ISBN 978-3528285180
