= Joop =

Joop is a Dutch masculine given name, often a short form (hypocorism) of Johannes, Joseph, Jacobus, or other names. It may refer to:

- Jogchum T. Joop Alberda (born 1952), Dutch volleyball coach, coach of the 1996 Olympic champion Dutch team
- Johannes J. Joop Atsma (born 1956), Dutch politician
- Johannes Joop Ave (1934–2014), Indonesian government minister
- Johannes A. Joop Bakker (1921–2003), Dutch politician
- Josephus Joop Beek (1917–1983), Dutch-born Indonesian Jesuit, priest, educator and politician
- Johannes J. Joop Beljon (1922–2002), Dutch artist
- Joop Böckling (born 1955), Dutch footballer
- Johannes W. Joop Boutmy (1894–1972), Dutch footballer
- Johannes F. Joop Braakhekke (1941–2016), Dutch chef, restaurateur, television presenter and author
- Joop Brand (born 1936), Dutch former football player and manager
- Johannes Joop Cabout (1927–2013), Dutch water polo player
- Johan R. Joop Carp (1897–1962), Dutch sailor, helmsman of the 1920 Olympic 6.4 Metre champion
- Johannes C. Joop van Daele (born 1947), Dutch former footballer
- Johannes J. Joop Demmenie (1918–1991), Dutch cyclist
- Johan H. Joop Doderer (1921–2005), Dutch actor
- Joop van Domselaar (1928–2006), Dutch sports shooter
- Joop Donkervoort (born 1949), Dutch businessman
- Jan L. Joop van Dort (1889–1967), Dutch footballer
- Johannes A. Joop van den Ende (born 1942), Dutch theatrical producer
- Jozef P. Joop Eversteijn (1921–2013), Dutch footballer
- Johannes J.M. Joop Falke (1933–2016), Dutch artist and goldsmith
- Joop Gall (born 1963), Dutch football manager and former player
- Johannes M. Joop Geurts (1923–2009), Dutch baseball player
- Johann G. Joop Glimmerveen (1928–2022), Dutch neo-Nazi
- Job Johannes Joop Gouweleeuw (1940–2017), Dutch judoka
- Joseph C.E. Joop Haex (1911–2002), Dutch politician, lieutenant general and twice State Secretary for Defence
- Johannes J.F. Joop Harmans (1921–2015), Dutch cyclist
- Johannes Joop van der Heide (1917–1980), Dutch footballer
- Johannes F. Joop Hiele (born 1958), Dutch former football goalkeeper
- Josephus J.C.M. Joop Hox (born 1949), Dutch psychologist and professor
- Joop Kasteel (born 1964), Dutch martial artist
- Johannes H.B. Joop Kemperman (1924–2011), Dutch mathematician
- Jacobus J. Joop Klant (1915–1994), Dutch economist and novelist
- Johannes H. Joop Knottenbelt (1910–1998), Dutch tennis player
- Joseph W. Joop Kolkman (1896–1944), Dutch journalist and diplomat
- Johan M. Joop Langhorst (1943–2013), Dutch footballer
- Jacob Joop Lankhaar (born 1966), Dutch footballer
- Johannes C. Joop van Nellen (1910–1992), Dutch footballer
- Joop van Oosterom (1937–2016), Dutch billionaire and twice correspondence chess world champion
- Jozef J.L. Joop Pelser (1892–1974), Dutch footballer
- Johannes Joop Post (born 1950), Dutch businessman
- Josephus Th. Joop Puntman (1934–2013), Dutch ceramist and sculptor
- Johannes P. Joop van der Reijden (1927–2006), Dutch politician
- Joannes B. Joop Roeland (1931–2010), Dutch priest and environmental activist
- Johannes J. Joop Rohner (1927–2005), Dutch water polo player
- Joop Sanders (1921–2023), Dutch-born American abstract expressionist painter
- Johannes H. Joop Stoffelen (1921–2005), Dutch footballer
- Joop Stokkel (born 1967), Dutch equestrian
- Johannes A. Joop Stokkermans (1937–2012), Dutch composer and pianist
- Johannes M. Joop den Uyl (1919–1987), Dutch politician
- Johannes A. Joop Vermeulen (1907–1984), Dutch long-distance runner
- Joop Voorn (born 1932), Dutch composer
- Jacob F. Joop Warouw (1917–1960), military officer involved in the Indonesian National Revolution
- Johan C.D. Joop van Werkhoven (born 1950), Dutch Olympic sailor
- Johan G. Joop Westerweel (1899–1944), Dutch World War II resistance leader
- Joop van Wijk (born 1950), Dutch documentary film director
- Joannes G. Joop Wijn (born 1969), former Minister of Economic Affairs of the Netherlands
- Joop Wilhelmus (1943–1994), Dutch pornographer
- Johan G. Joop Wille (1920–2009), Dutch footballer
- Johannes J. Joop van Woerkom (1912–1998), Dutch water polo player
- Josephus W. Joop Zalm (1897–1969), Dutch weightlifter
- H. G. Jozef Joop Zoetemelk (born 1946), Dutch racing cyclist, winner of the 1980 Tour de France and the 1979 Vuelta a España

Fictional character

- Joop ter Heul, female eponymous protagonist of a series of books and a movie

== See also ==
- Jaap (given name)
- Joep
