= Zalm =

Zalm is a surname. Notable people with the surname include:

- Bill Vander Zalm (born 1934), Canadian politician and businessman
- Gerrit Zalm (born 1952), Dutch politician and businessman
- Joop Zalm (1897–1969), Dutch weightlifter
