= Joop Falke =

Dutch artist and goldsmith (1933–2016)

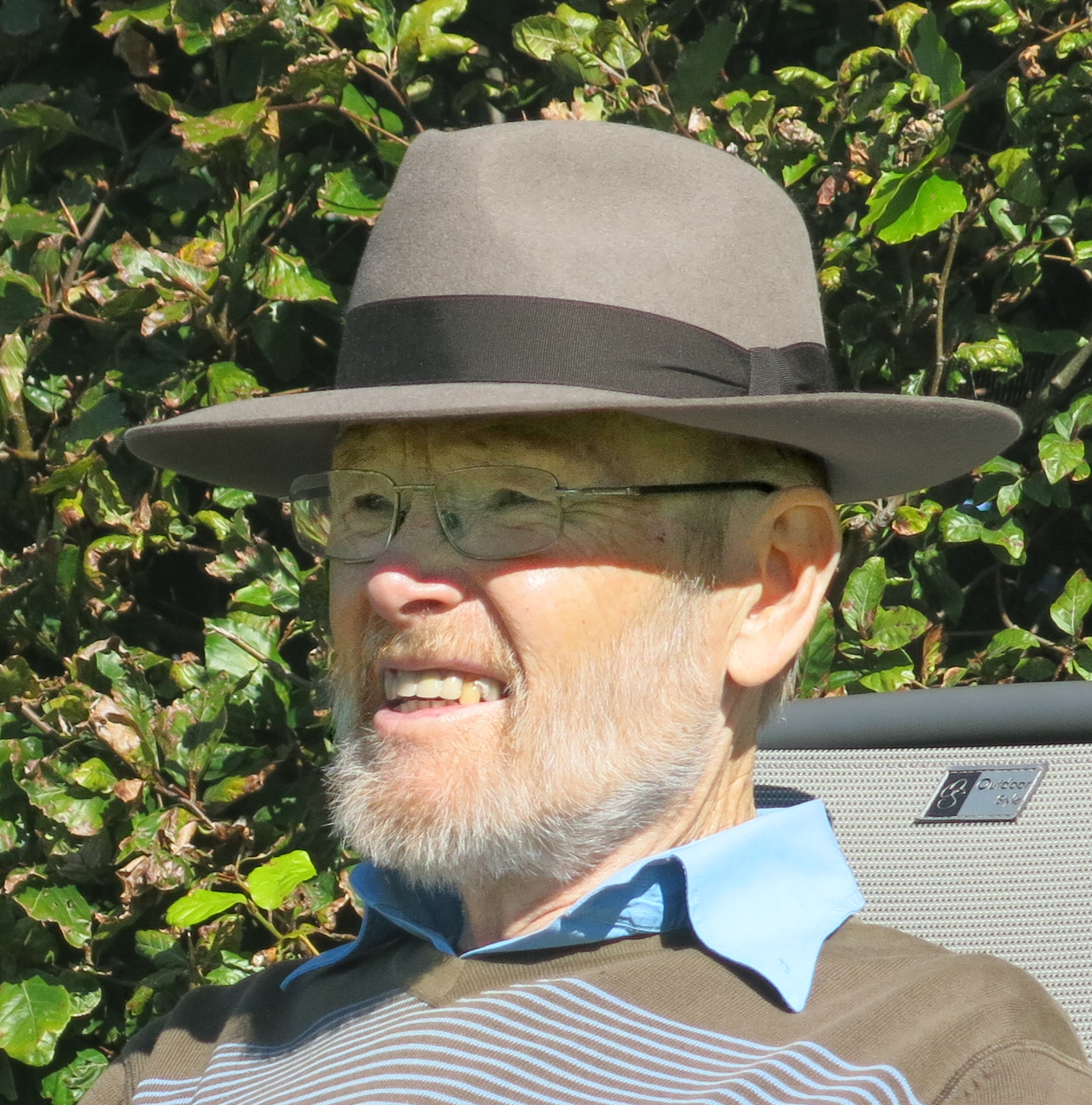
- Joop Falke
- Born: Johannes Josephus Maria Falke; 23 March 1933 (age 92); Dordrecht, The Netherlands
- Died: 3 October 2016; Oss, The Netherlands
- Education: French Zwollo jr
- Known for: Goldsmith, Jeweler, and sculptor
- Movement: Abstract
- Patrons: Oss and other Local Government Institutions

Joop Falke (1933–2016), born in Dordrecht on 23 March, died in Oss 3 October; was a Dutch artist and goldsmith.

== Life and work ==
Joop Falke was a brother of the artist / graphic designer Heinz Falke. He studied at the Academy of Fine Arts and Applied Arts in Arnhem (1955–1958), where he was taught by, among others, goldsmith and jewellery designer French Zwollo jr.

Falke developed his own signature: a no frills, simple, austere approach to ordinary beauty. After his education he settled in Oss. He made jewellery from precious metals, liturgical vessels, Eucharistic work for churches, sculptures, and statues of various materials. He was active 1958–2015. He created many works of art under the Dutch "1% rule" (for the new construction of government buildings 1% of the sale price has been set aside to 'dress' the building with art).

His studio / shop was located in the Houtstraat, in the centre of Oss. Falke was for 25 years a lecturer at the Free Academy in Oss. He taught silver and goldsmithing techniques, and jewellery. He was awarded in 2013 with the Osje of Merit, the official award of the municipality of Oss, as a token of appreciation and gratitude for his work as a goldsmith / artist. He was a member of the AKKV and the Brabant Foundation for the Visual Arts.

In January 2016, Joop Falke was exhibited at the Politics café "Salt" at the Groene Engel in Oss. He died later that year, at the age of 83.

== Photo gallery ==
Jewelry

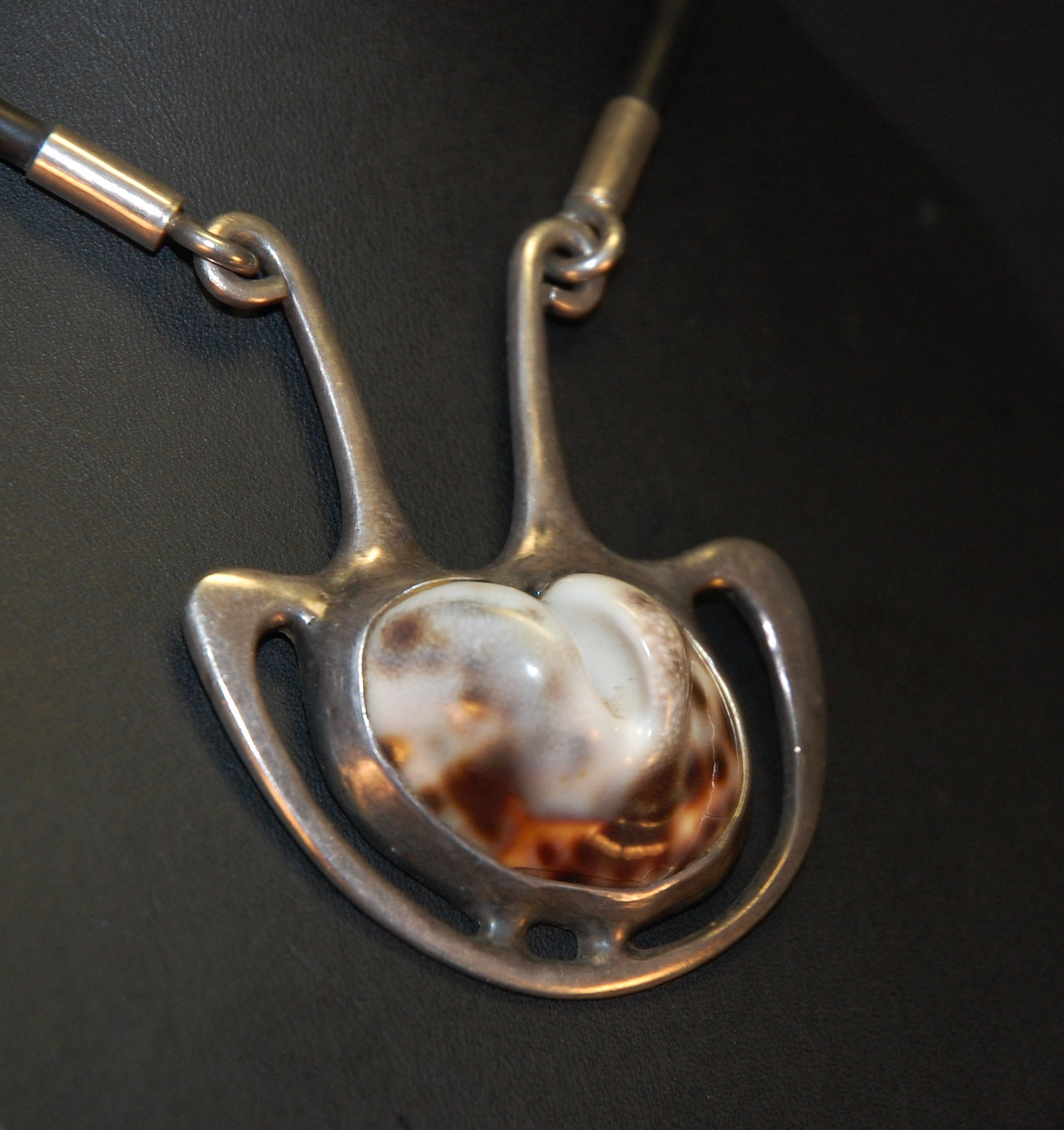
Pendant in silver, with shell

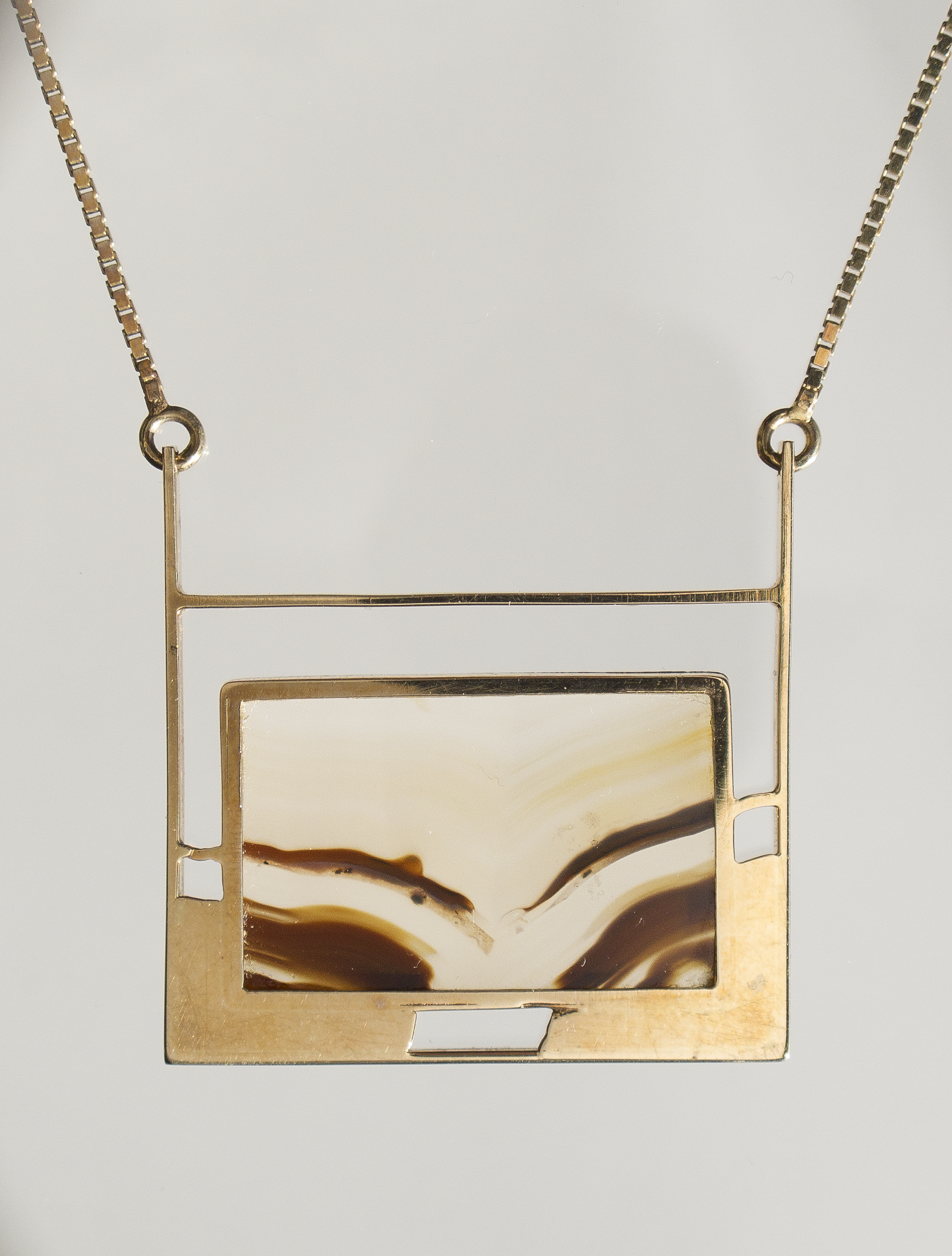
Pendant, in gold

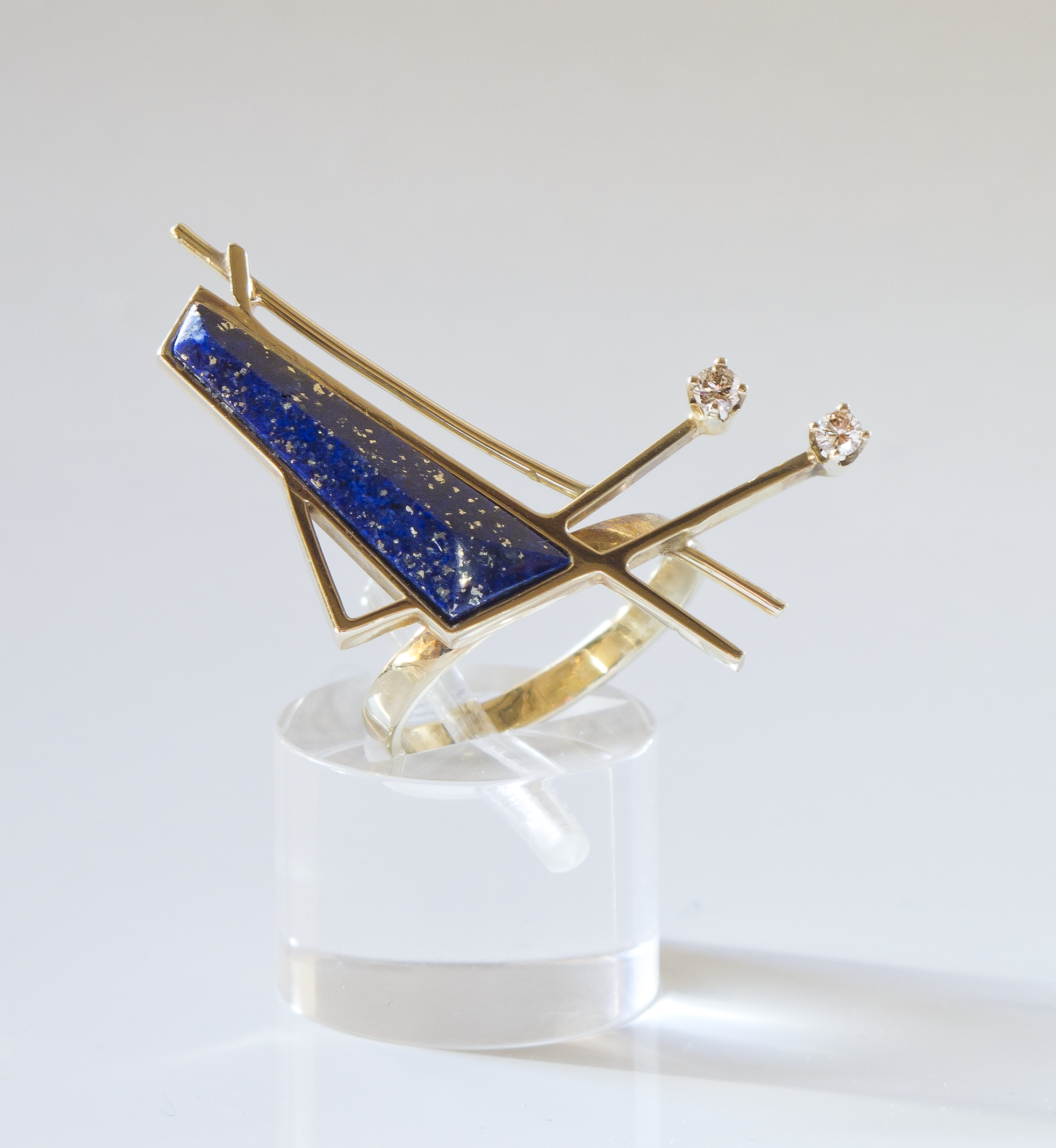
Ring in gold, with diamonds and lapis lazuli

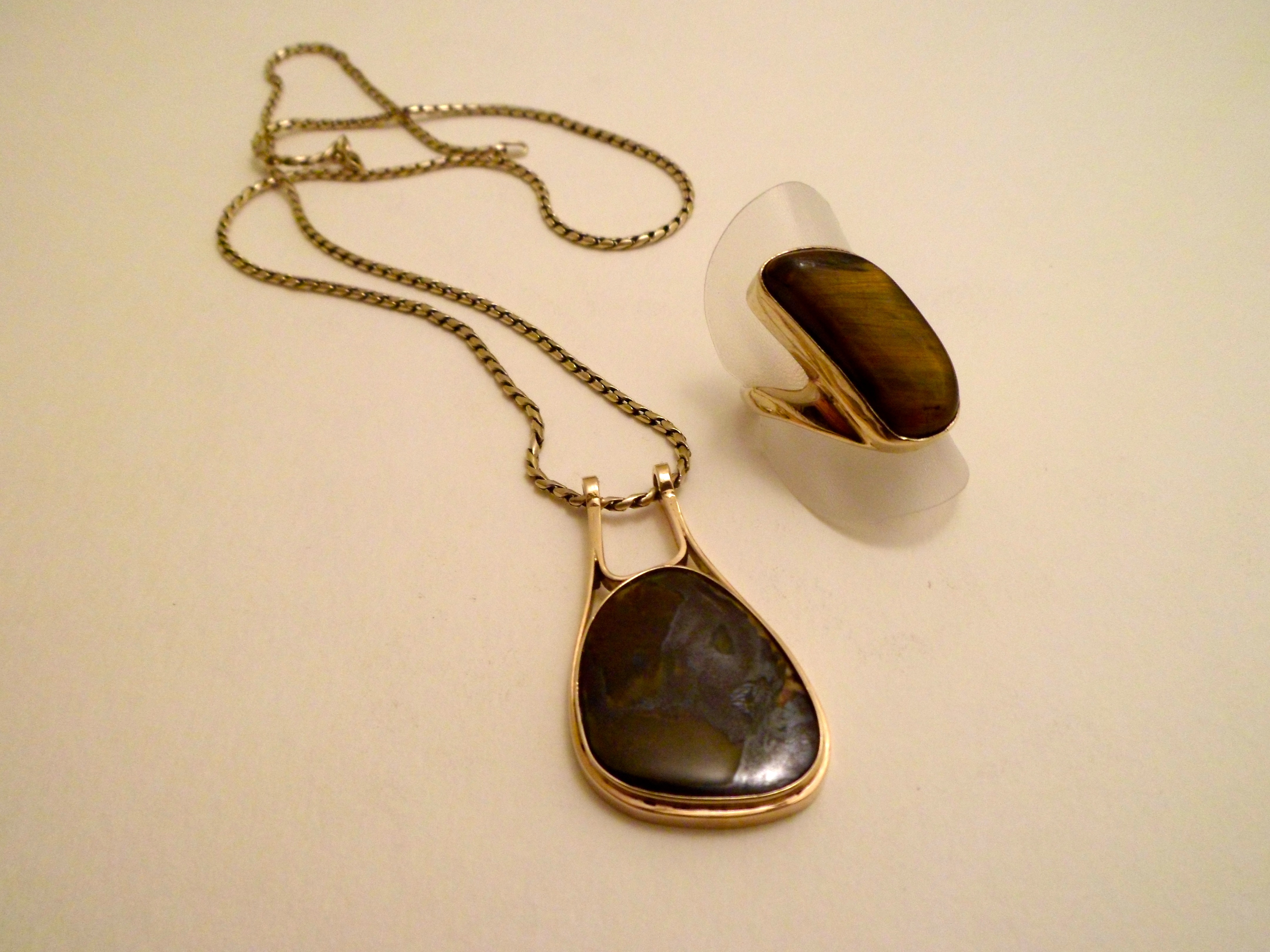
Pendant and ring, in gold en with tiger

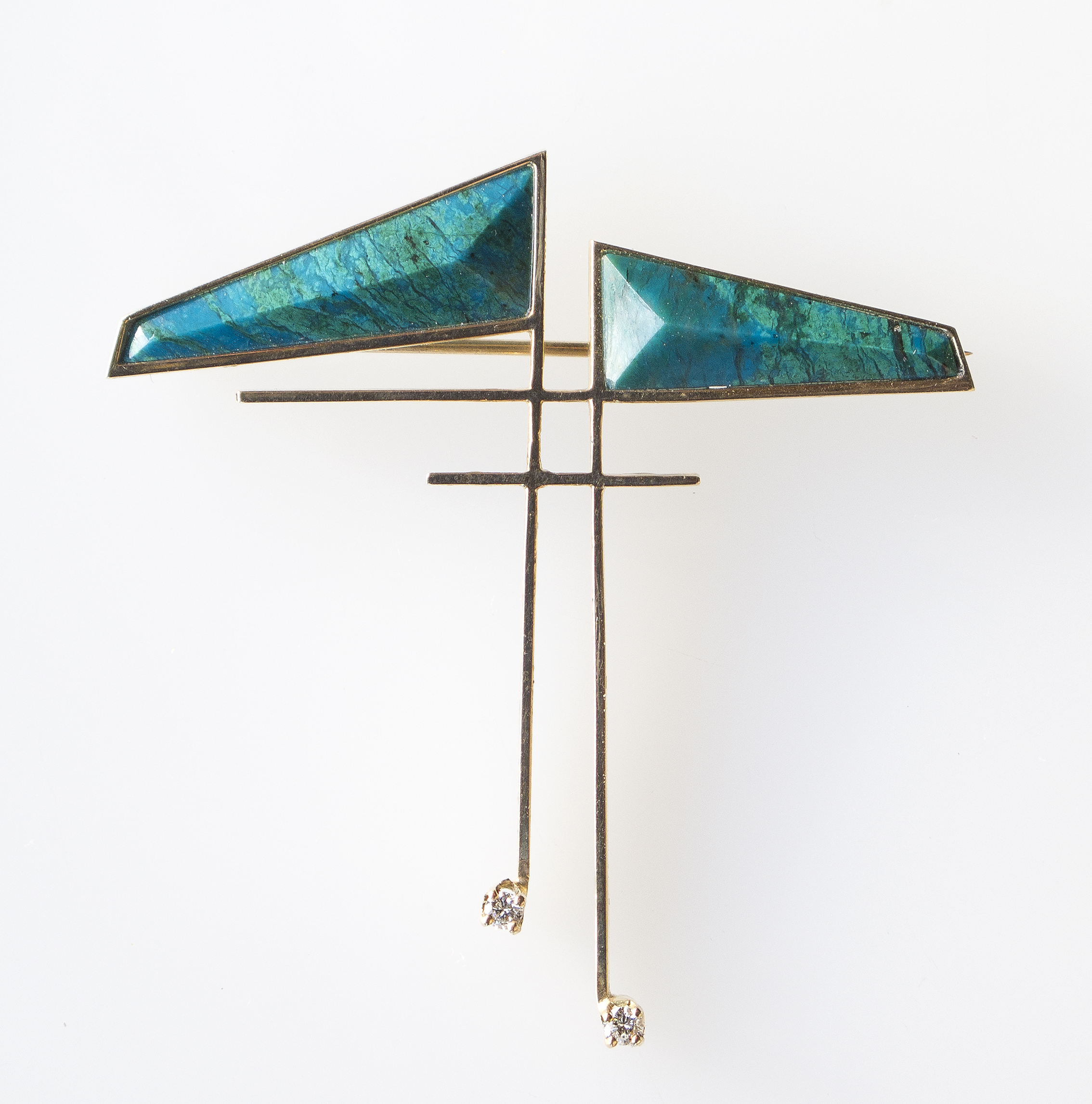
Brooch, in gold

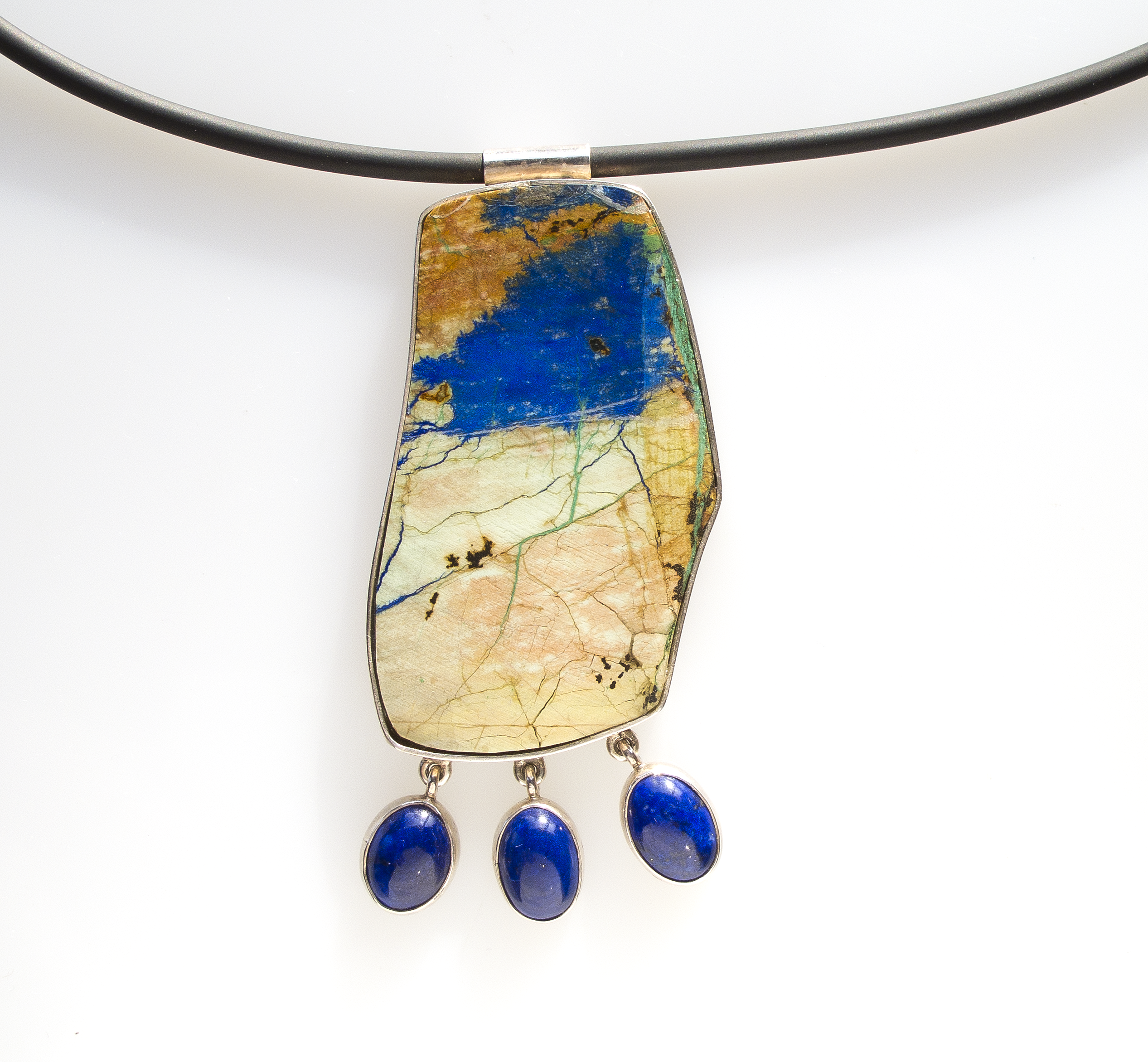
Hanger, in silver (with lapis lazuli)

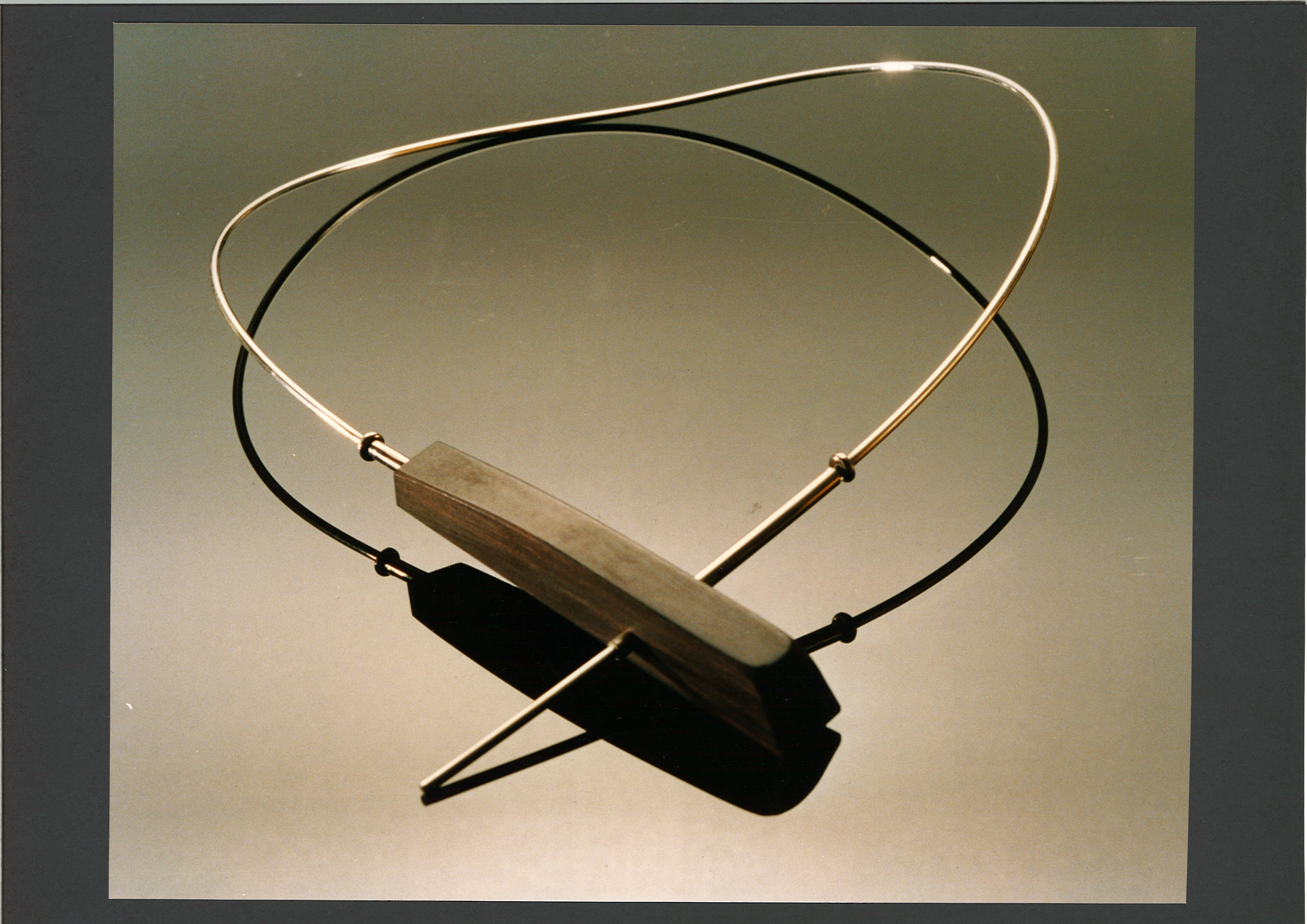
Necklace in silver, with piano key

Eucharistic objects

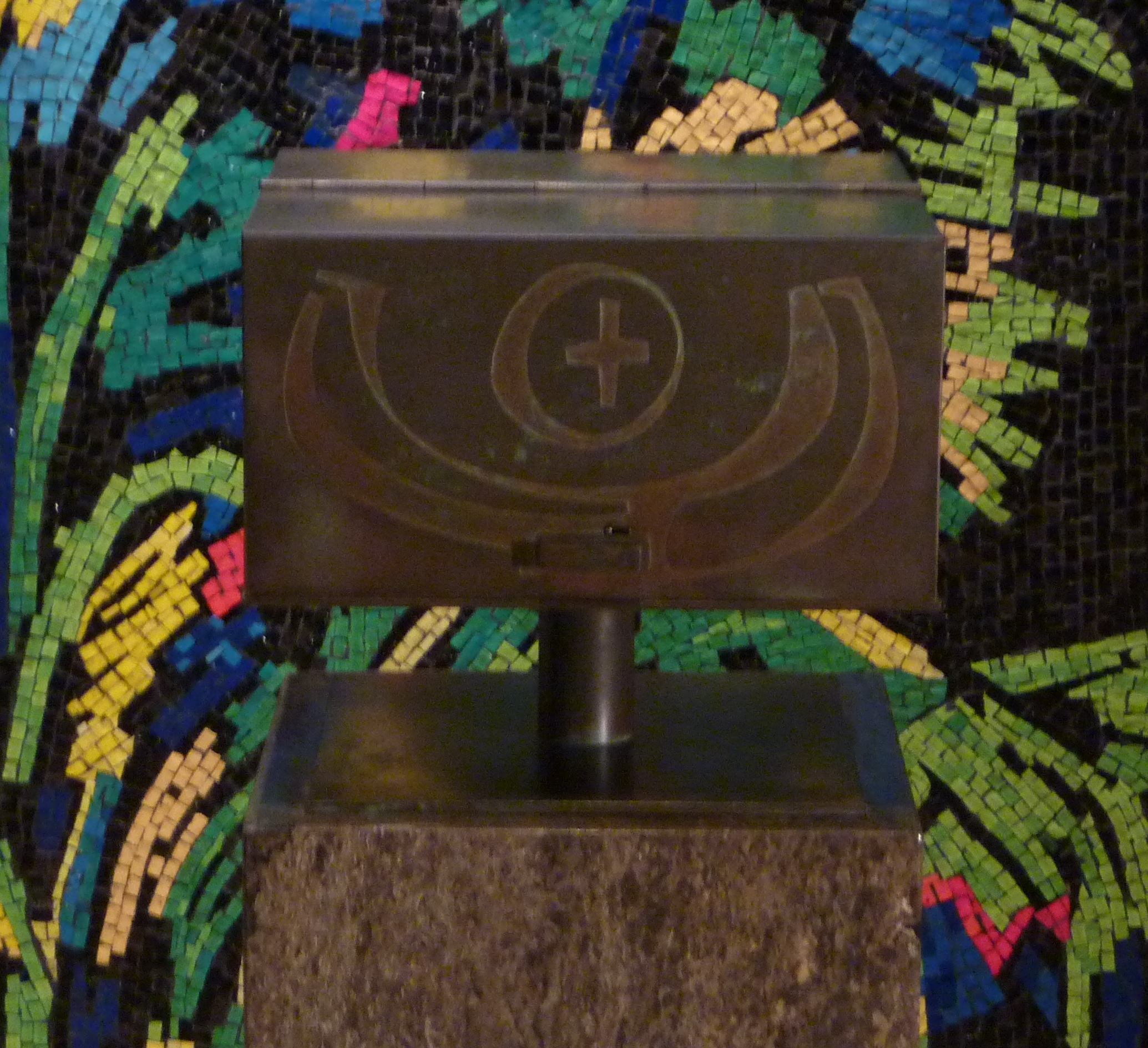
Tabernakel. Etched brass plate. 1968

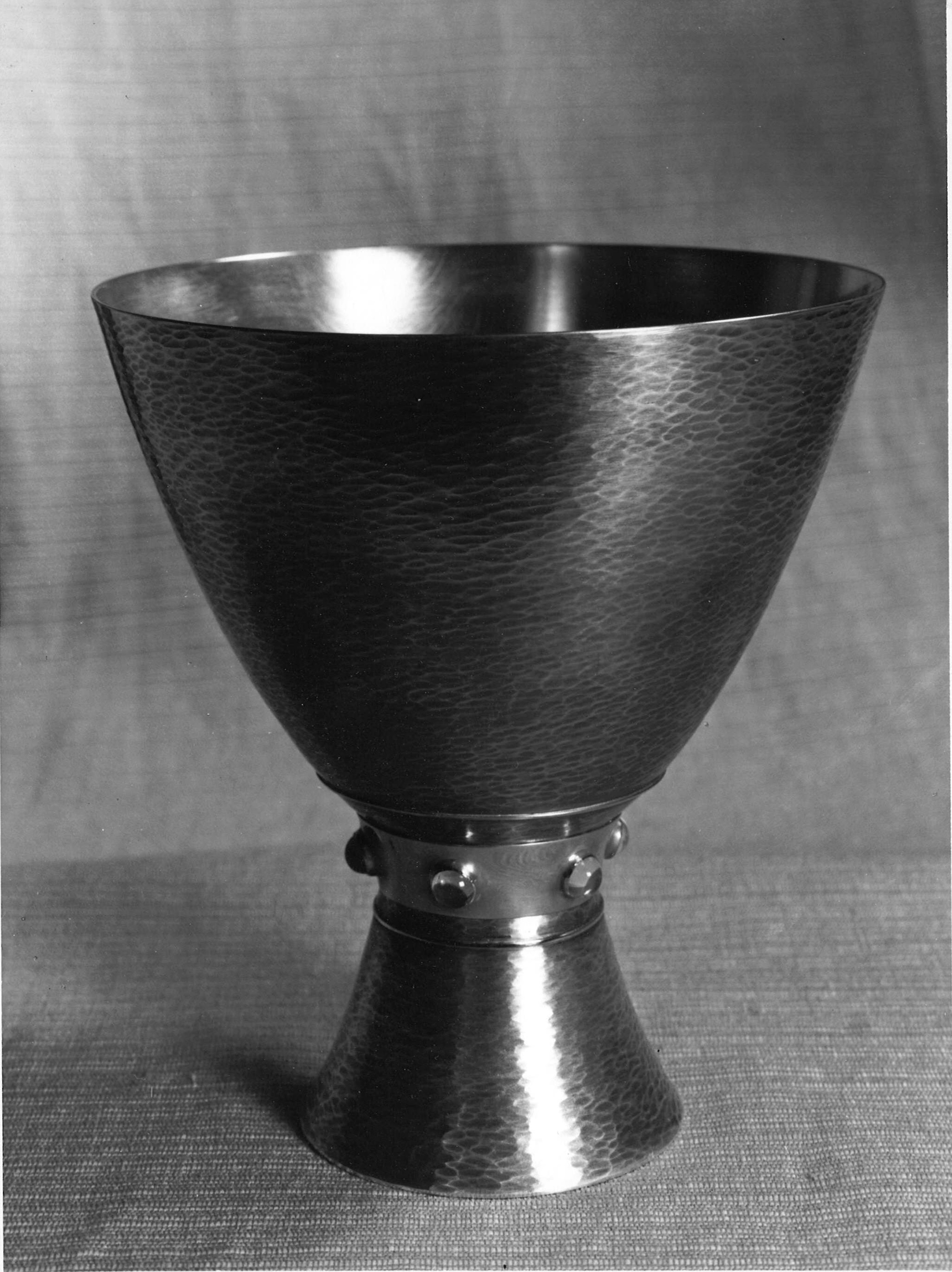
Chalice. 1960

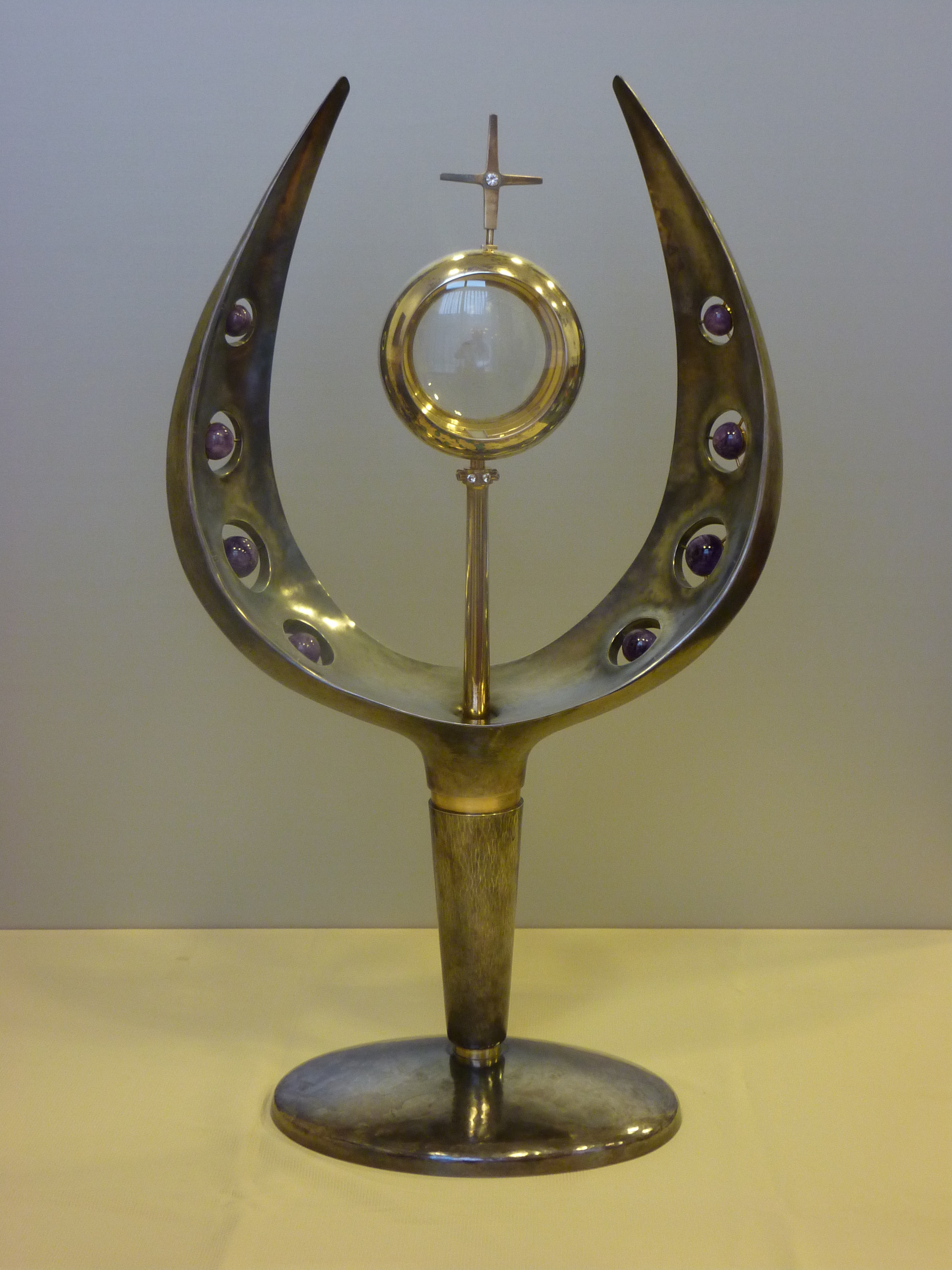
Monstrance, partly gilded silver with pearls and amethysts, 1963

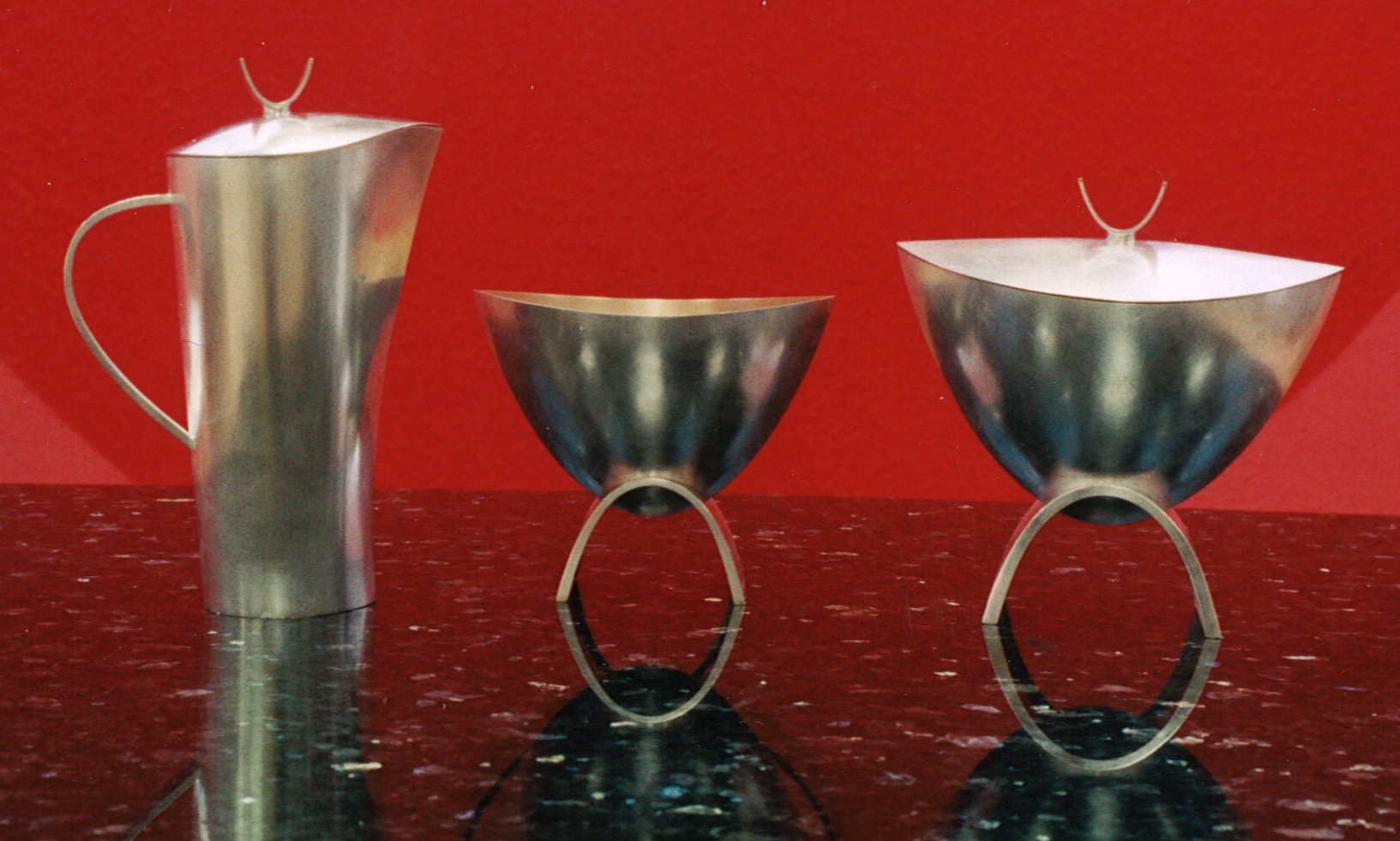
Silverware. 1997

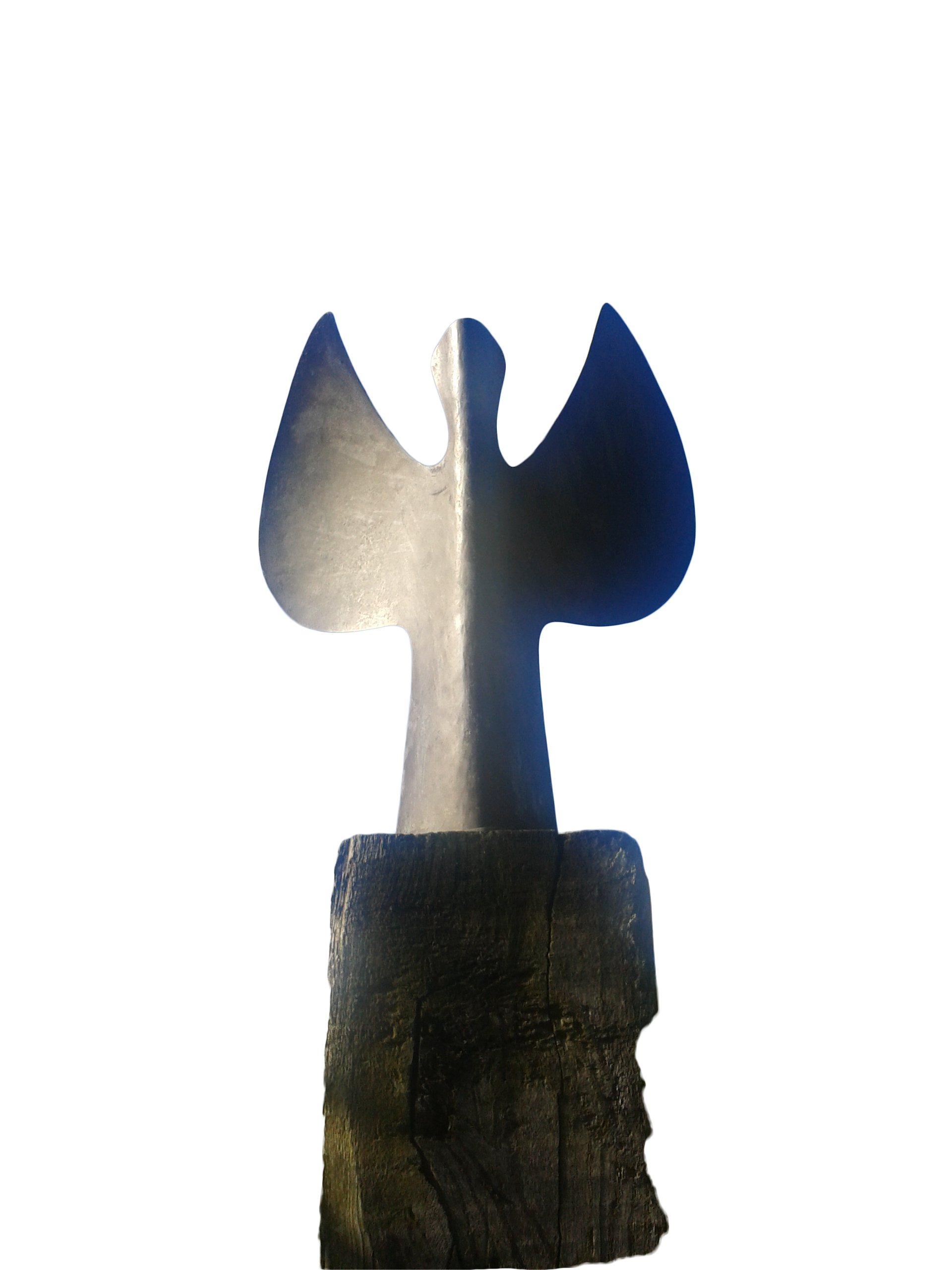
Angel JF

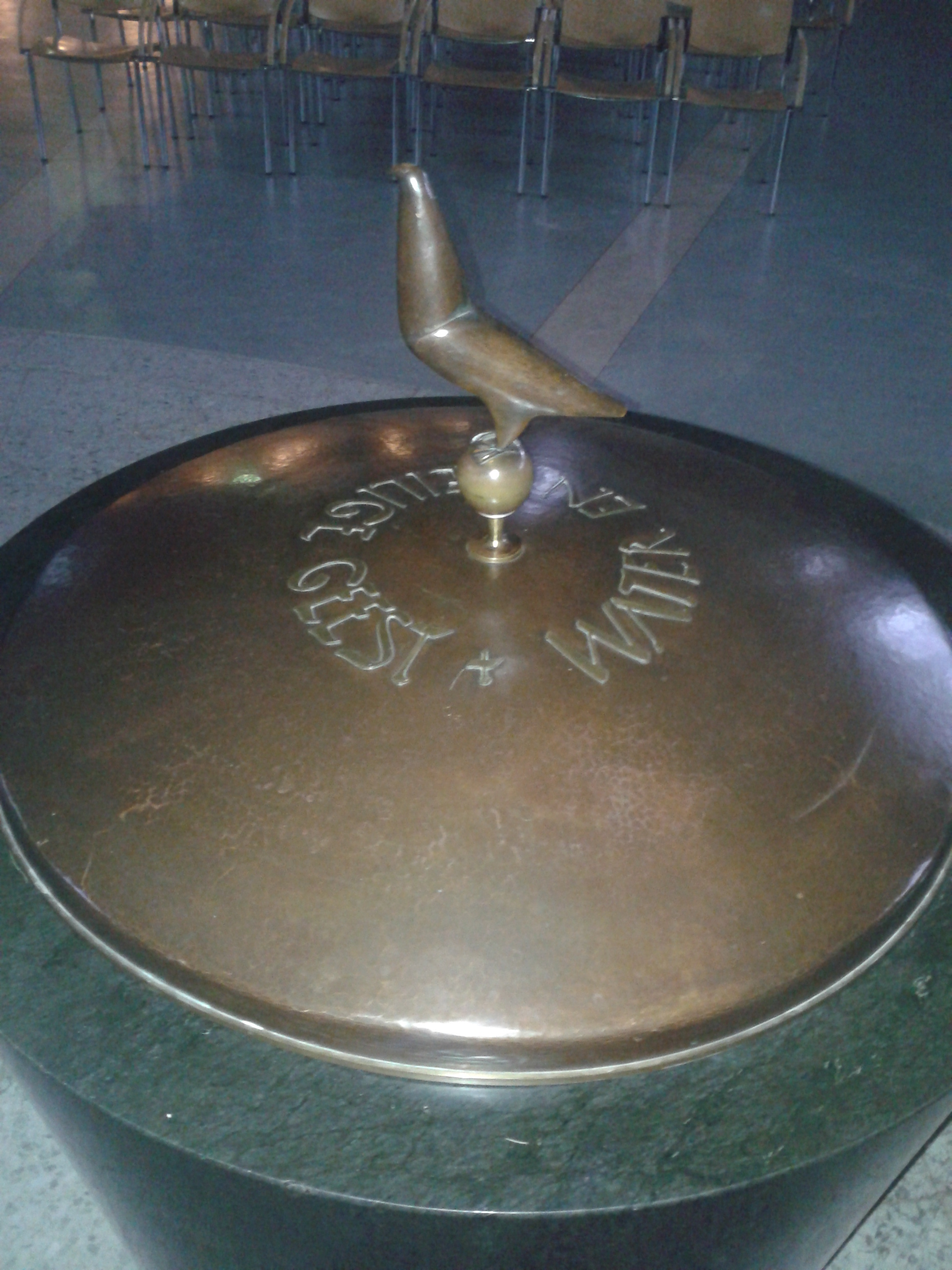
Font Cover. Red copper. 1961

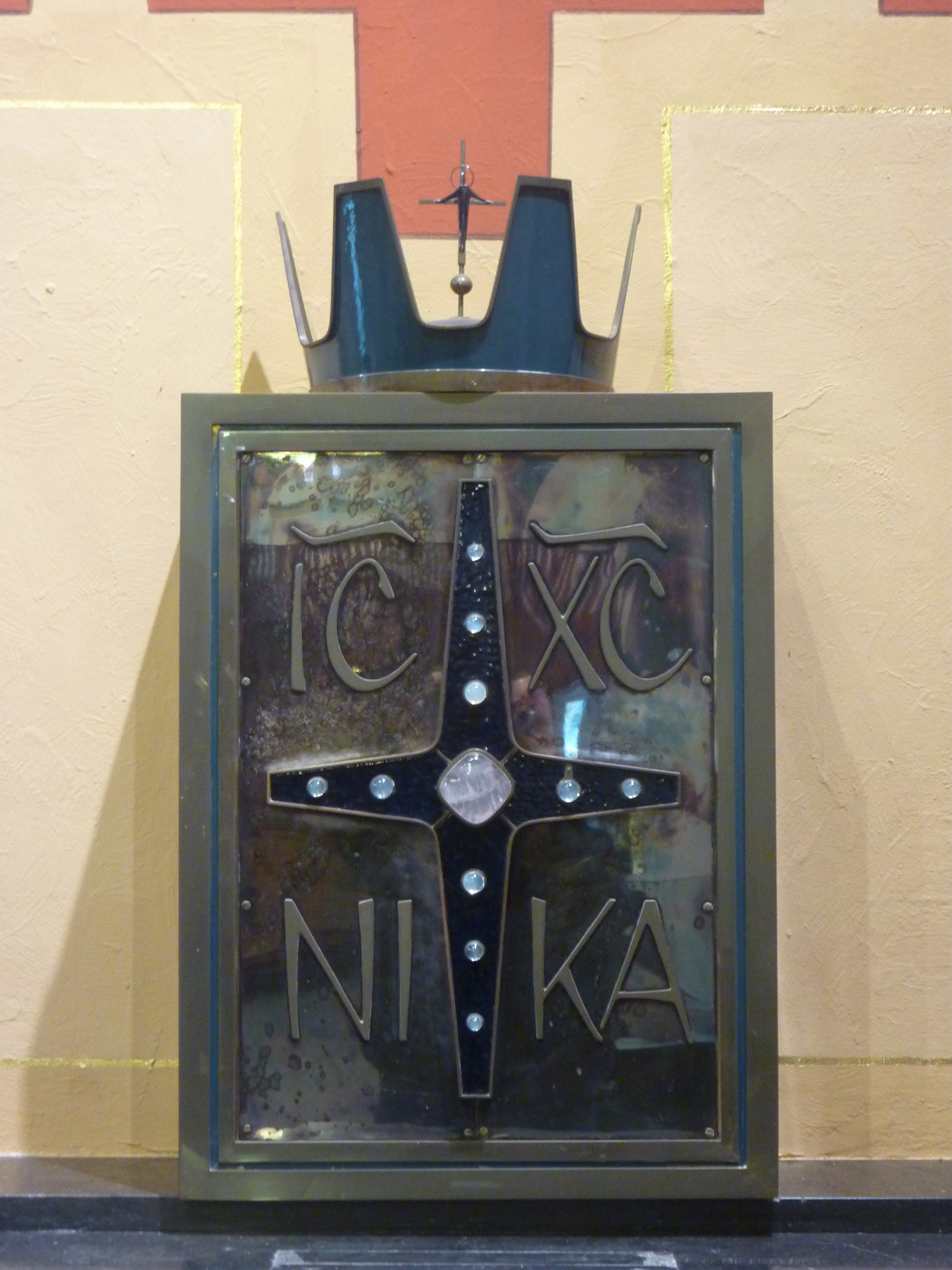
Tabernacle. Brass, enamel, rose quartz and burned amethysts, 1959

Sculptures

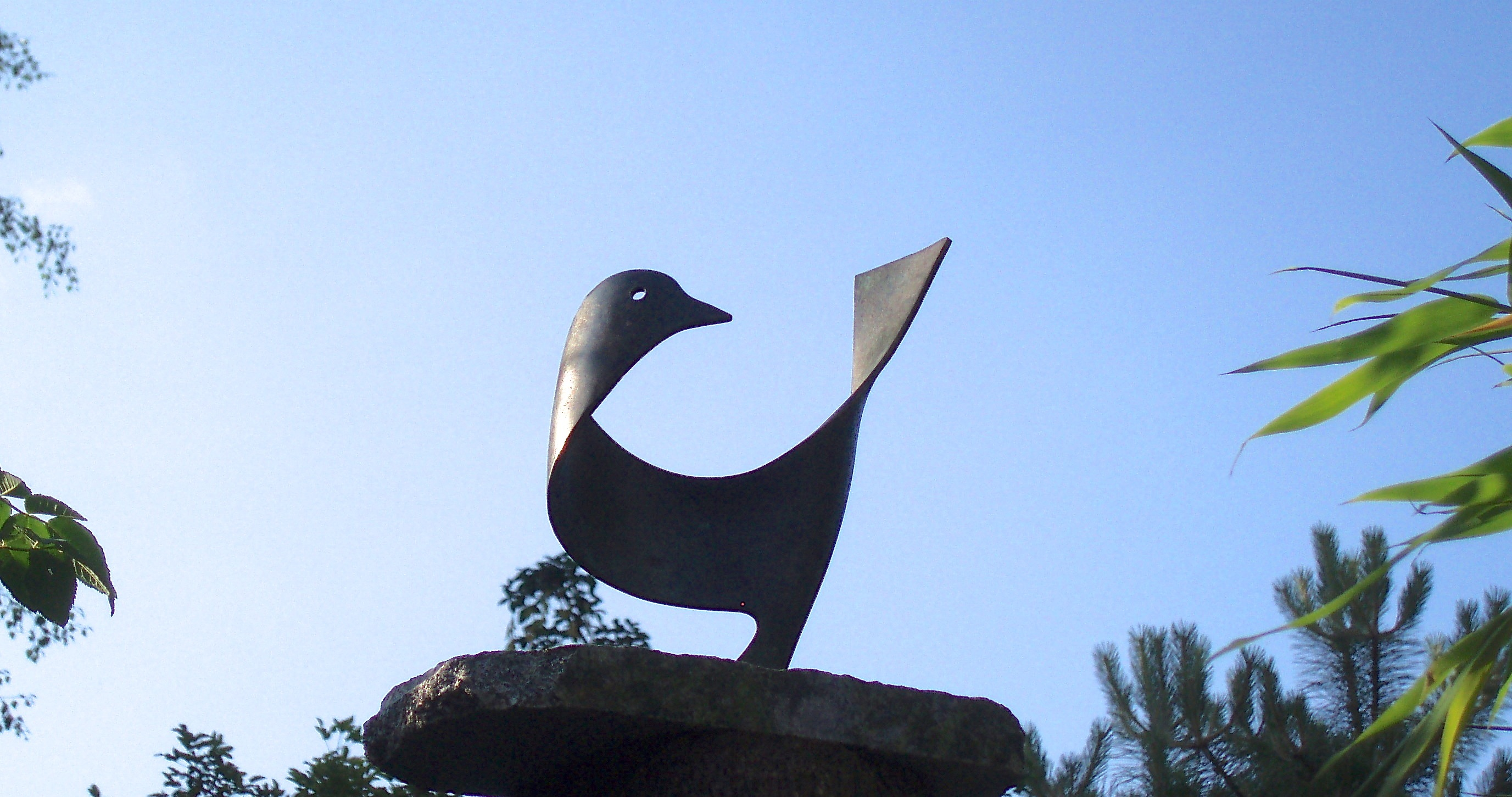
Bird

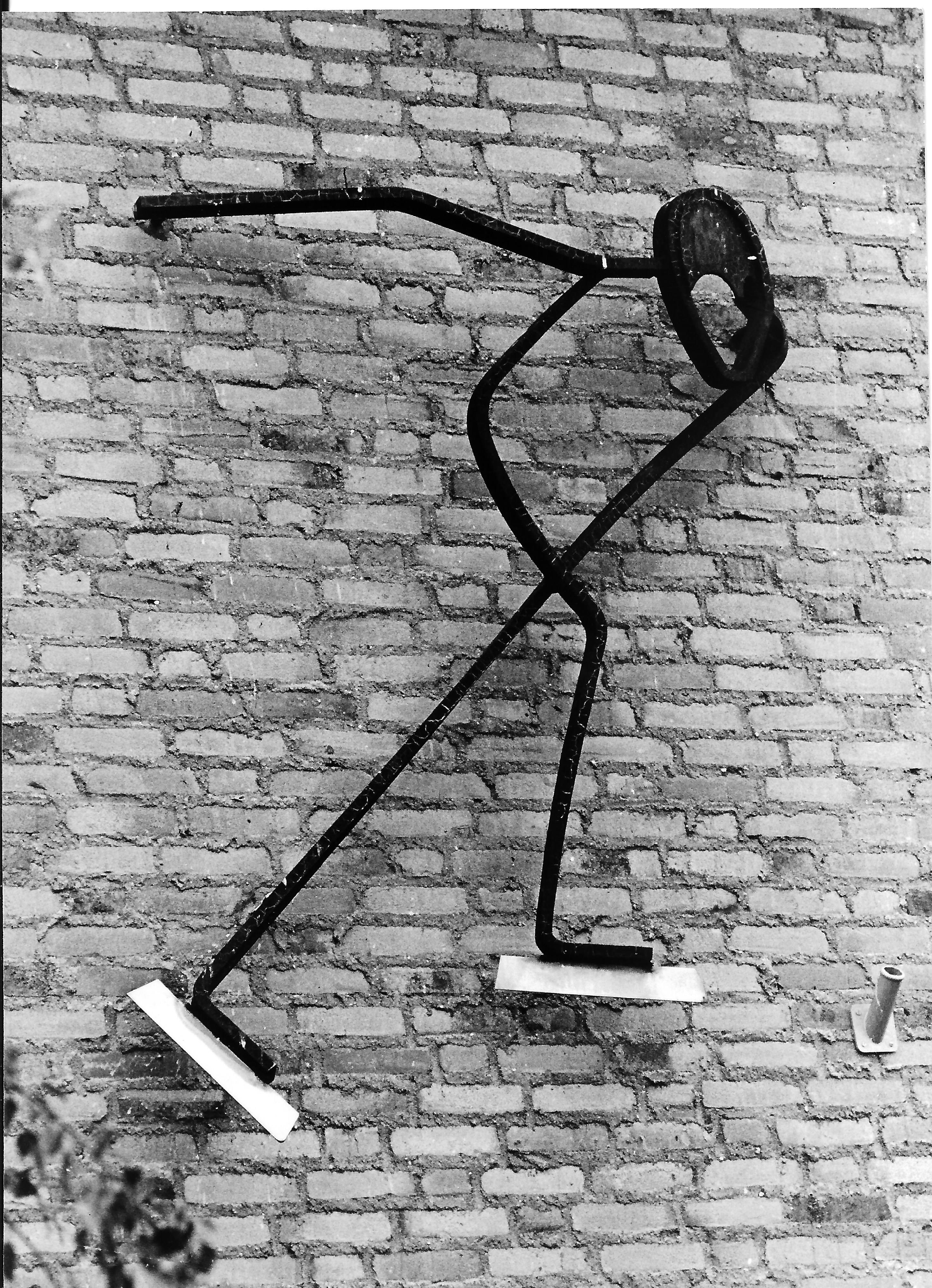
Wall Ornament 'Skater' Oss. Iron, lacquered. 1969

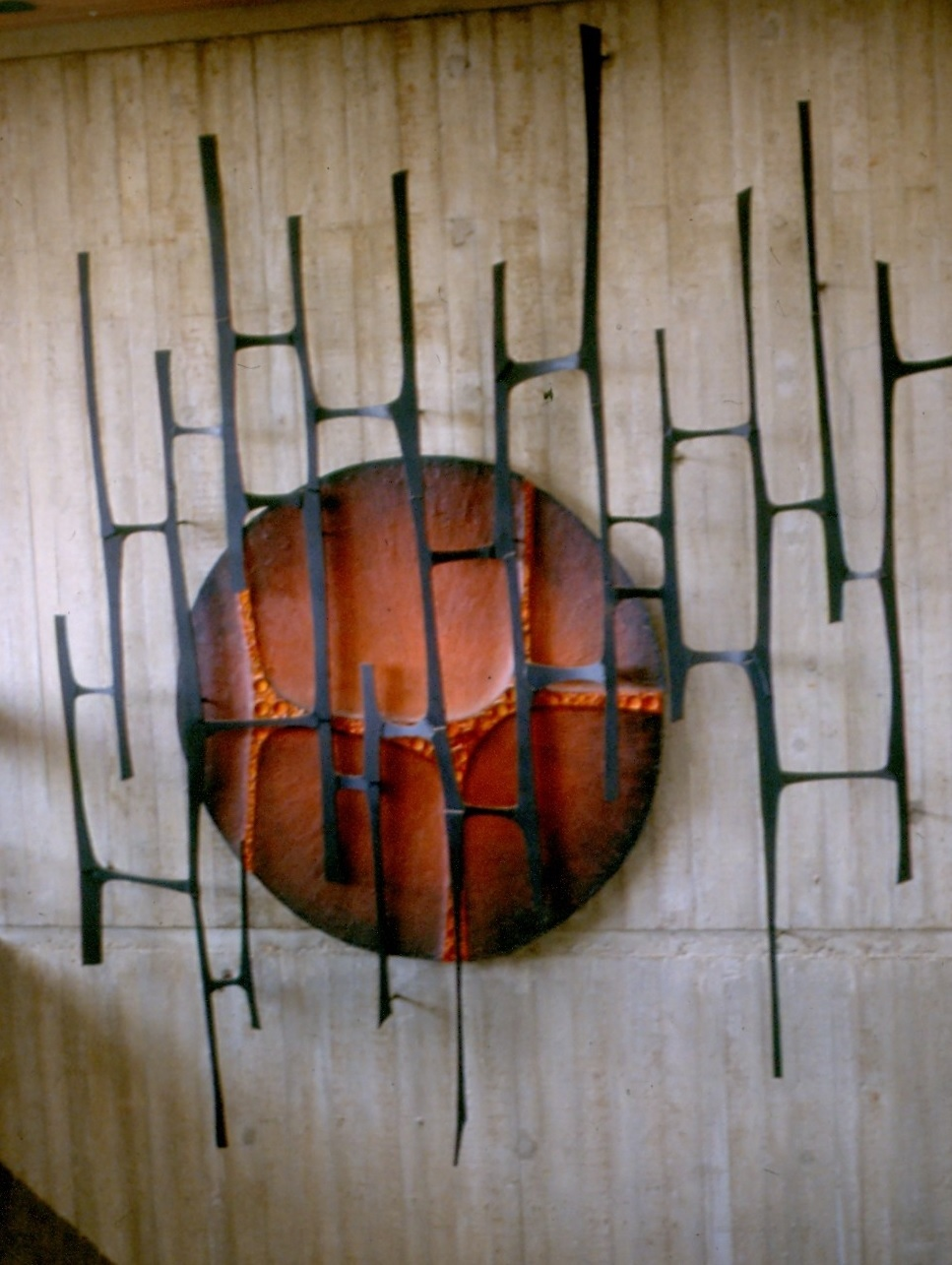
Abstract

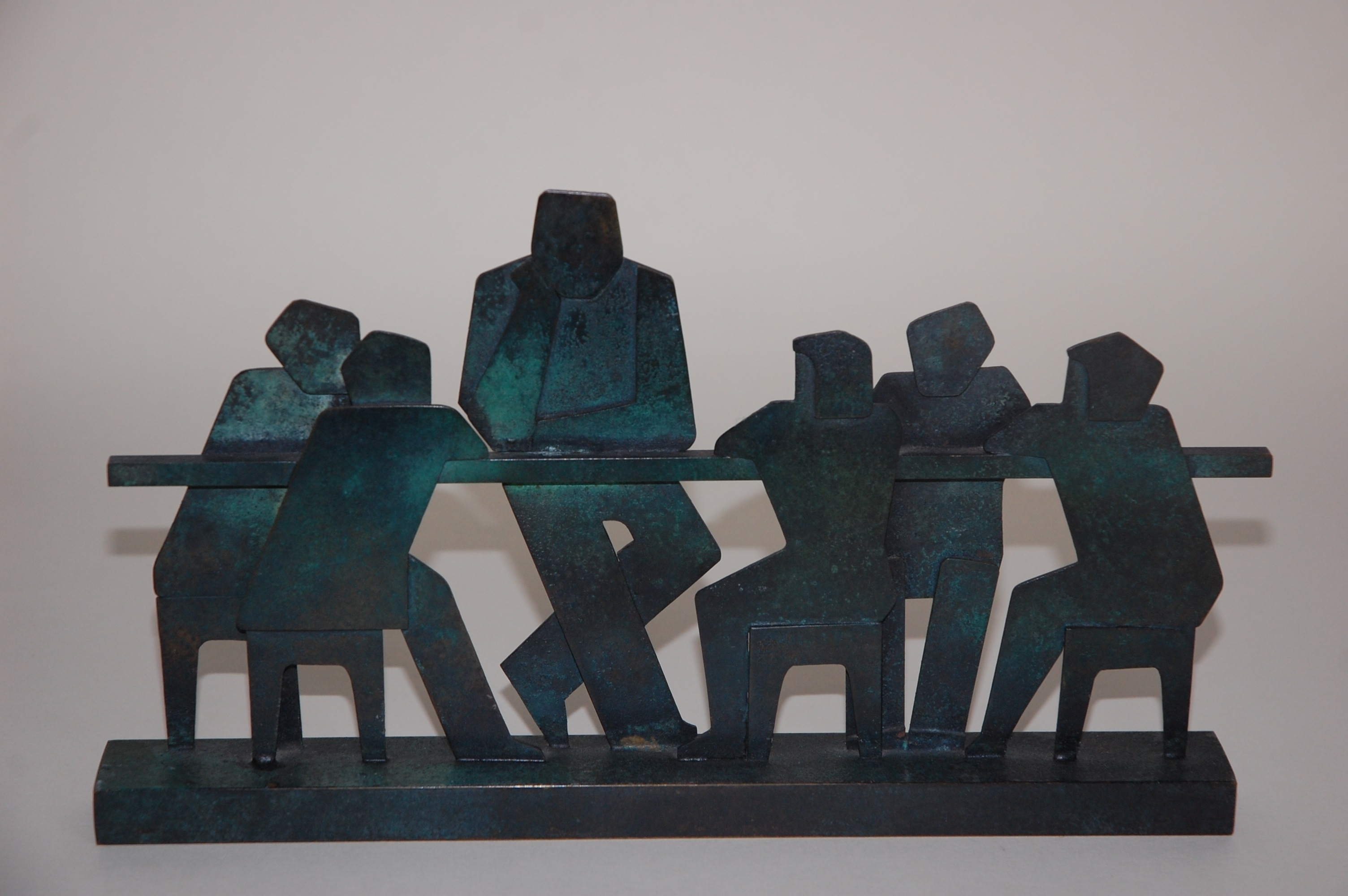
'Conversation'

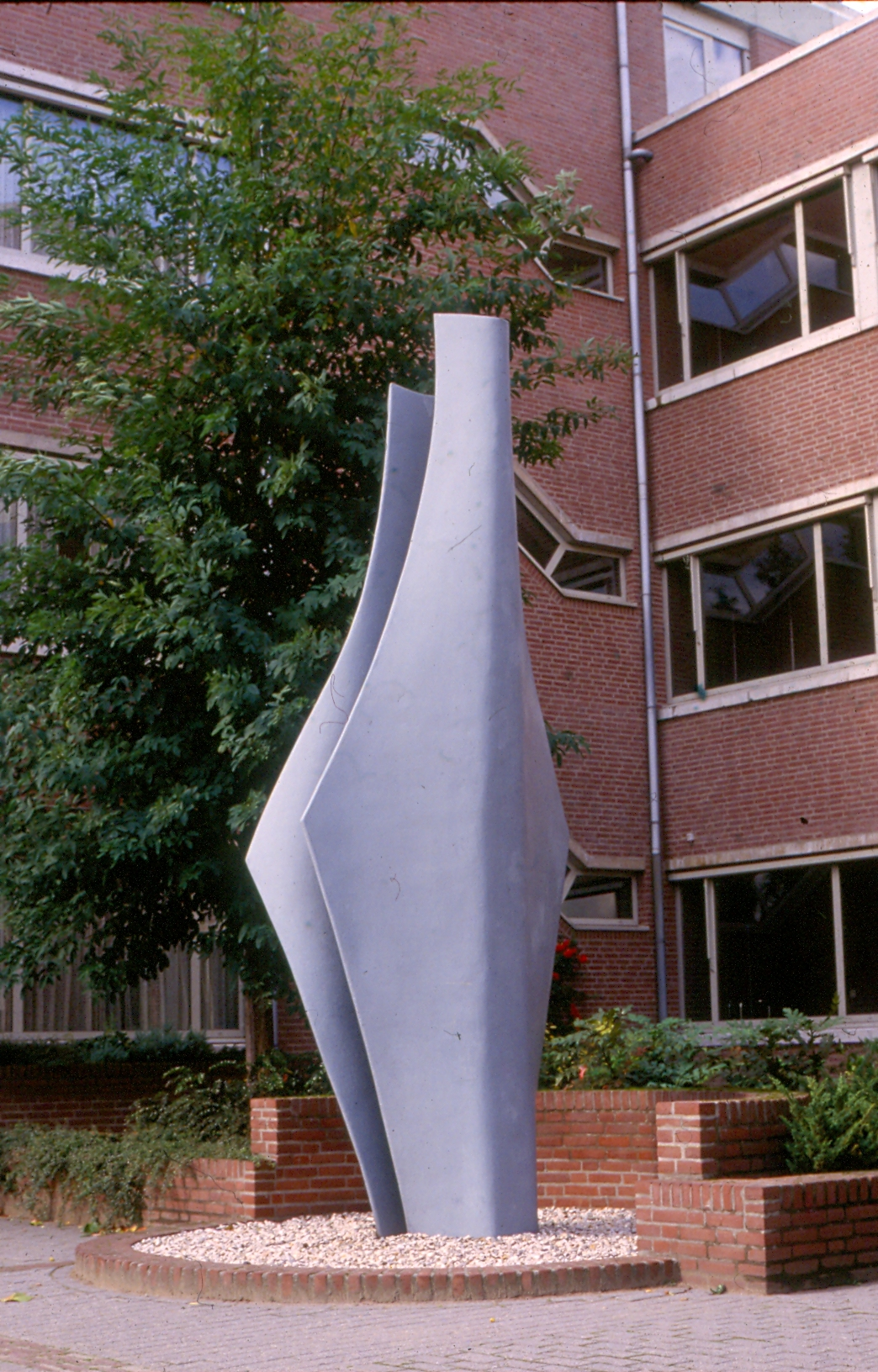
Wedding' image in polyester, the GGD in Oss, 1978

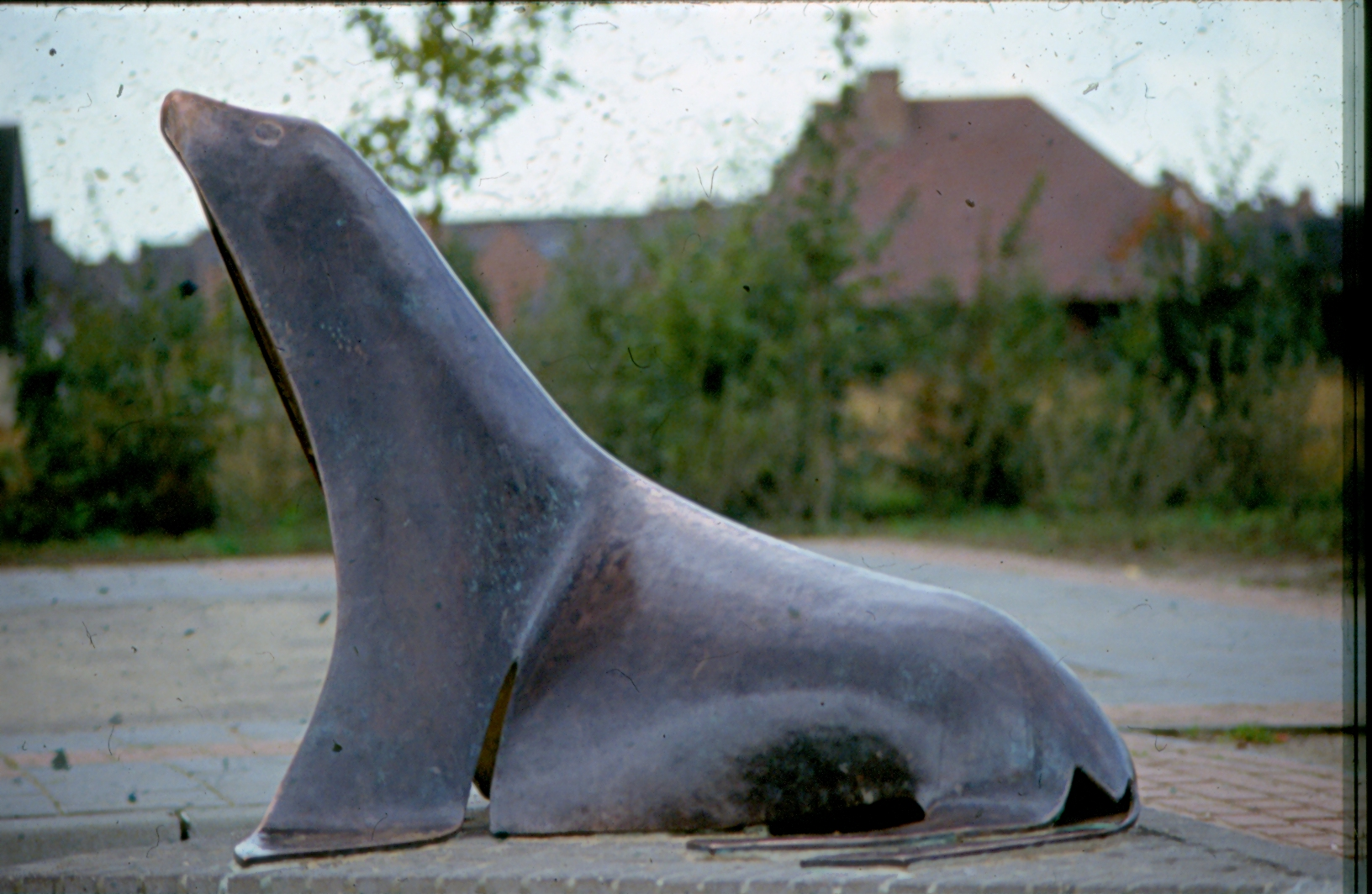
Sea Lion, with former LOM school 'De Terp' in Oss, 1979

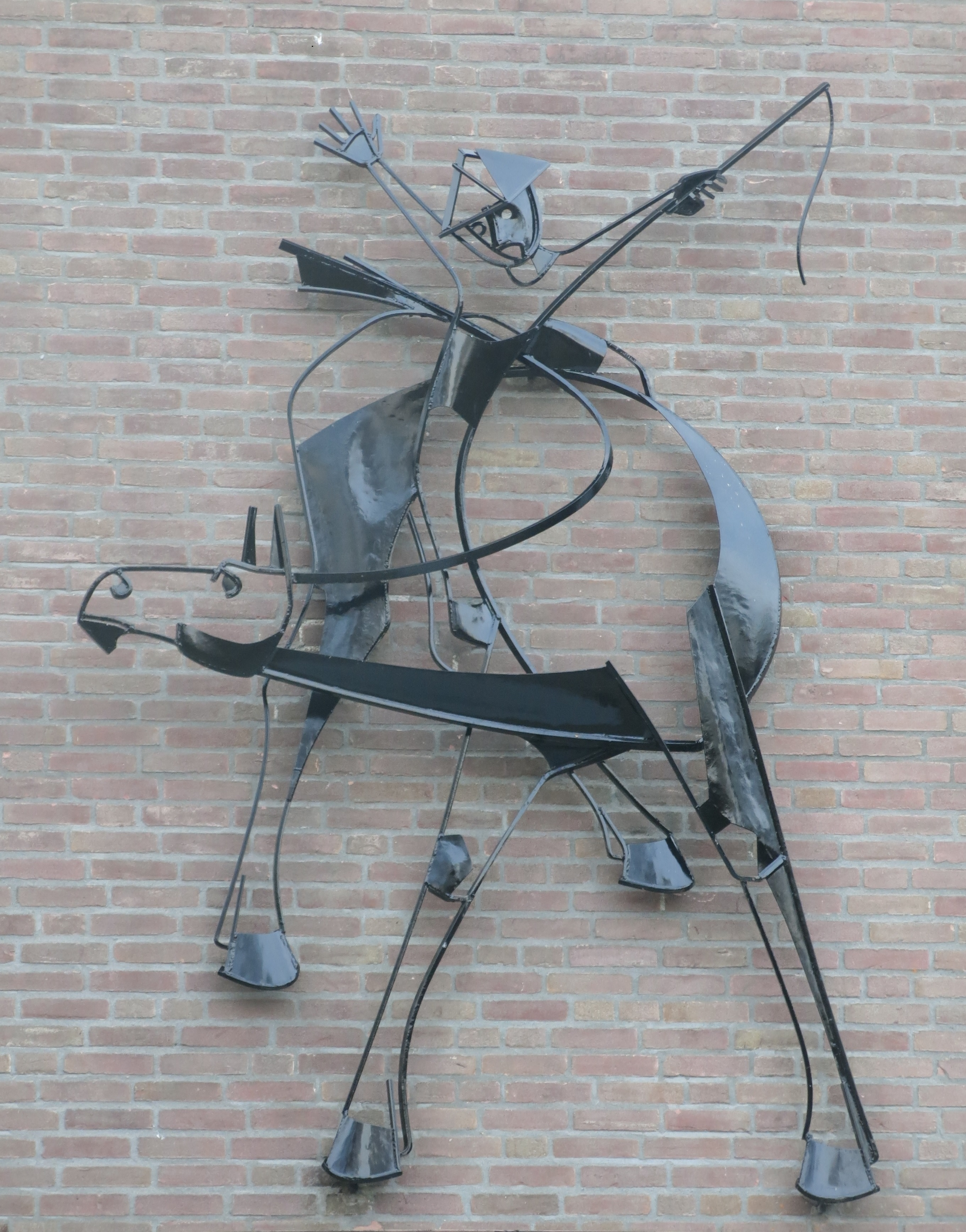
Wall Ornament "Koentje" Pius X school Oss. 1962

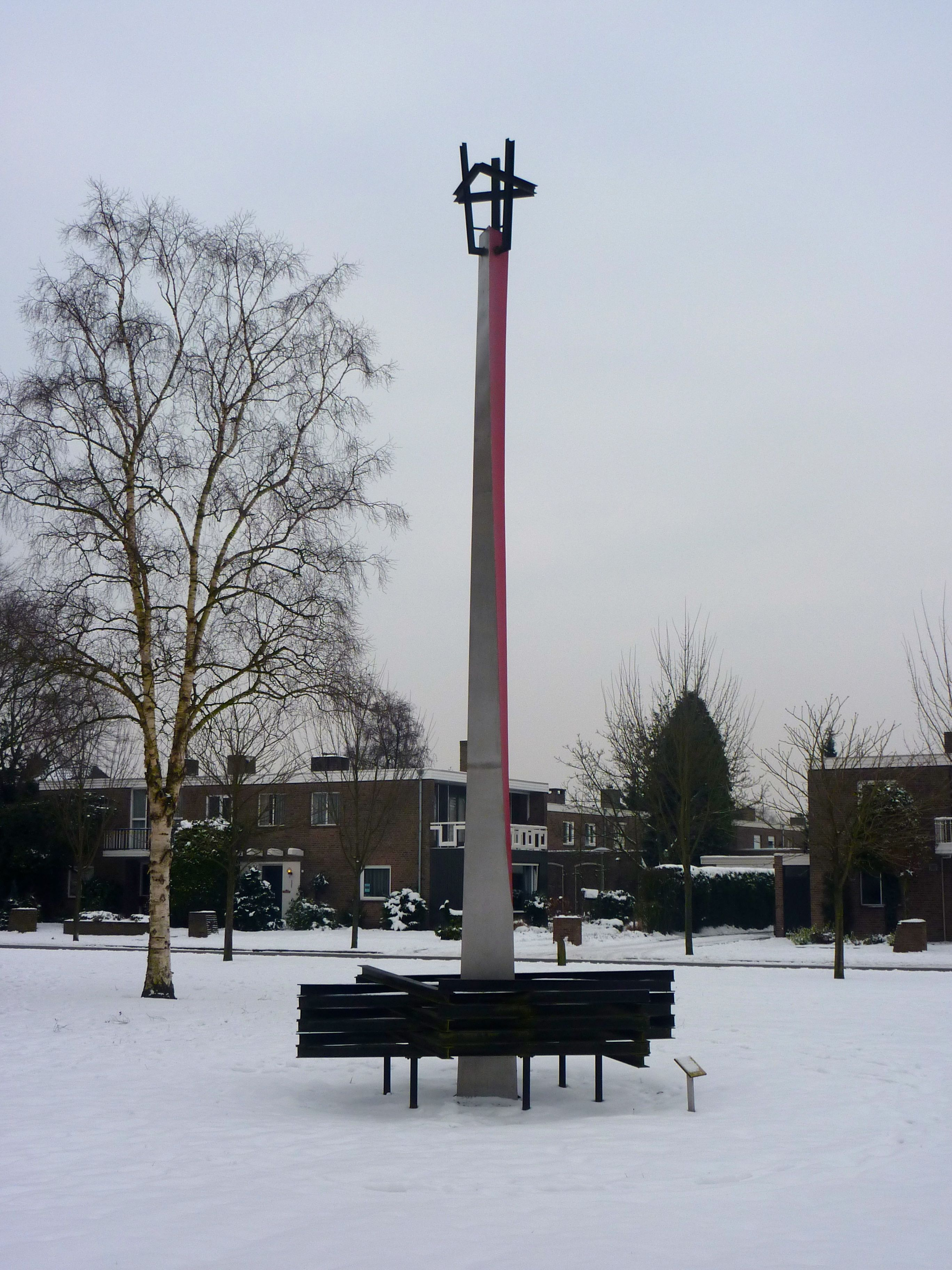
Picture taken at the former Edith Stein High school in Oss, 1970

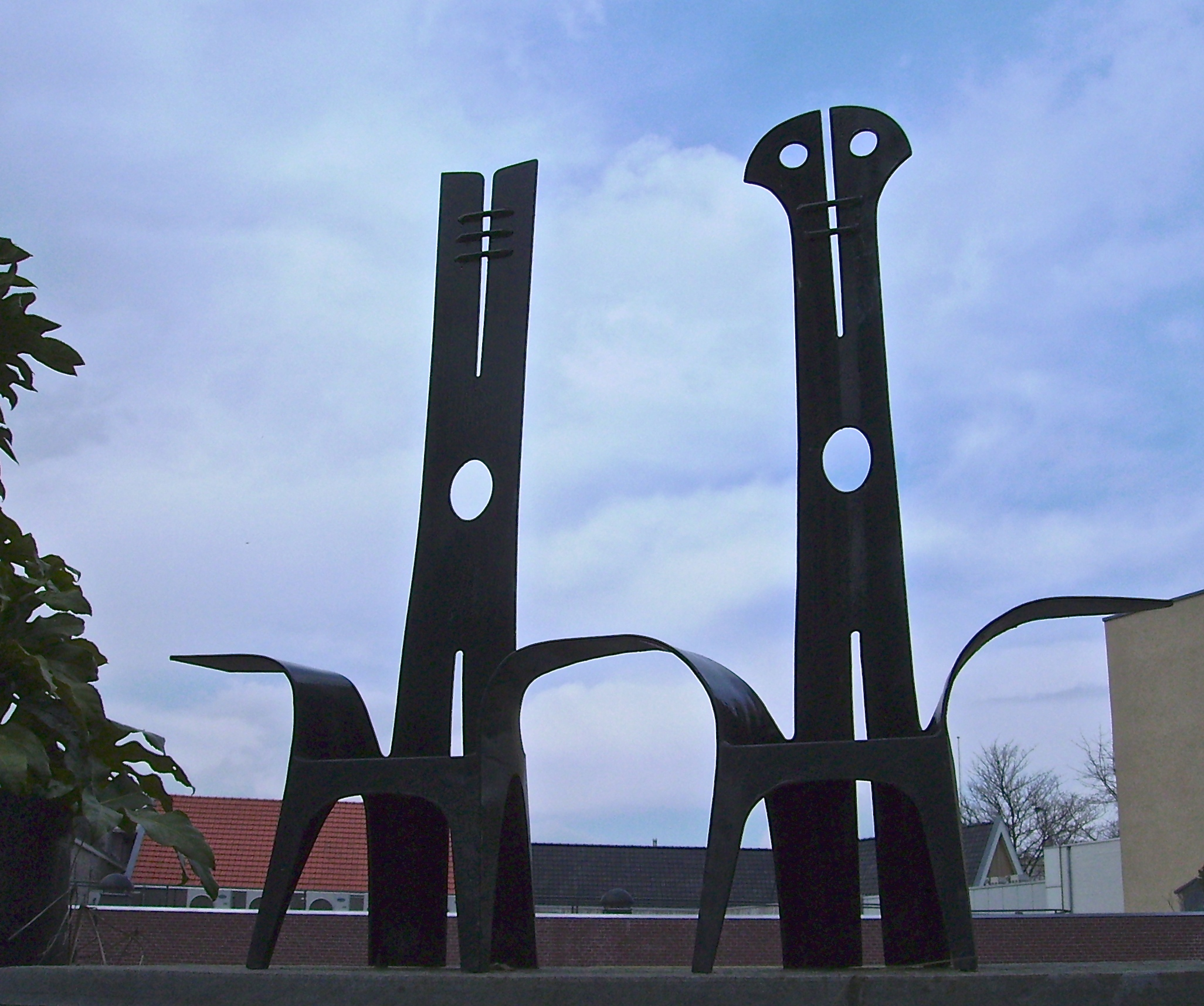
Chairs

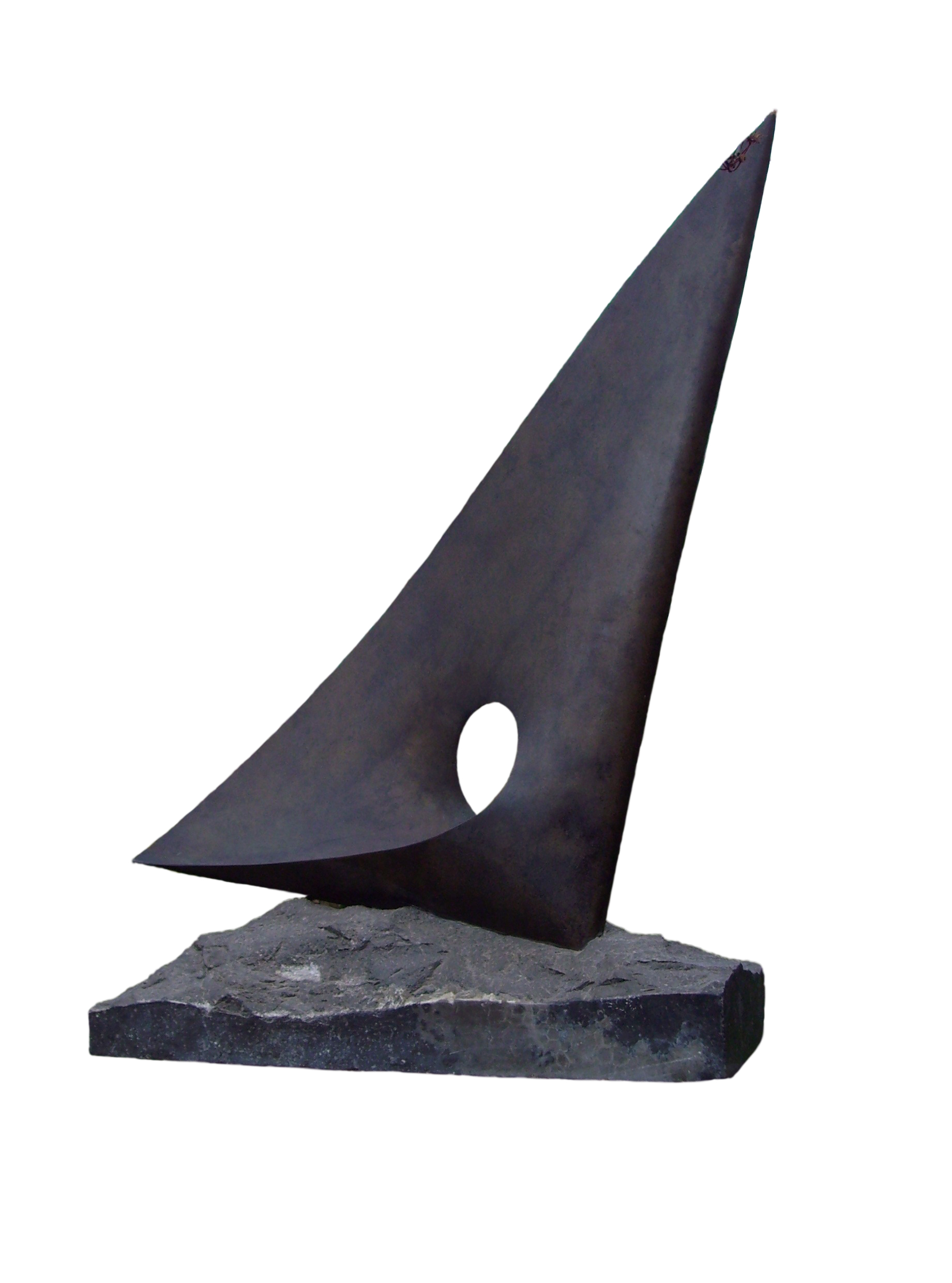
Sail JF

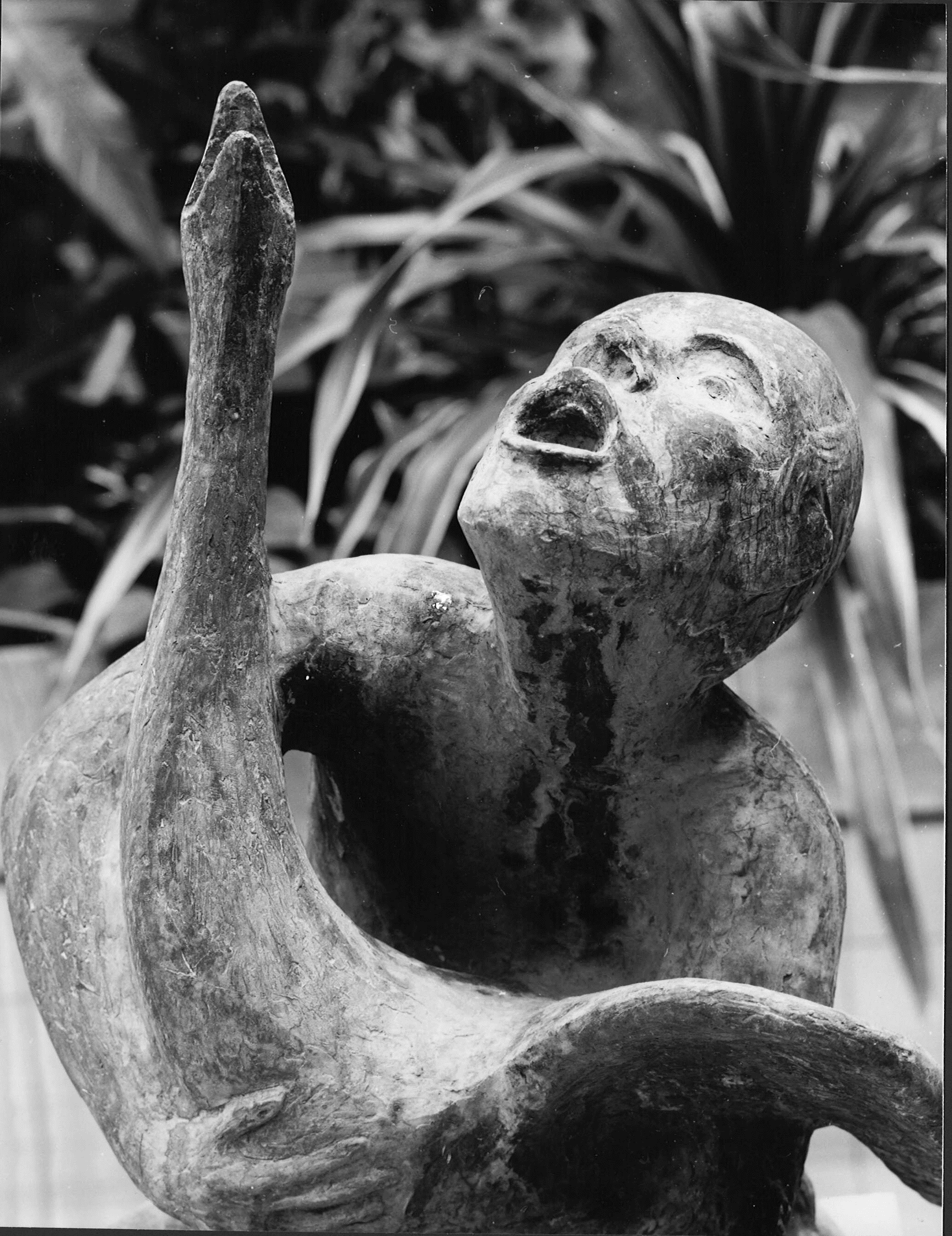
Bronze fountain 1978

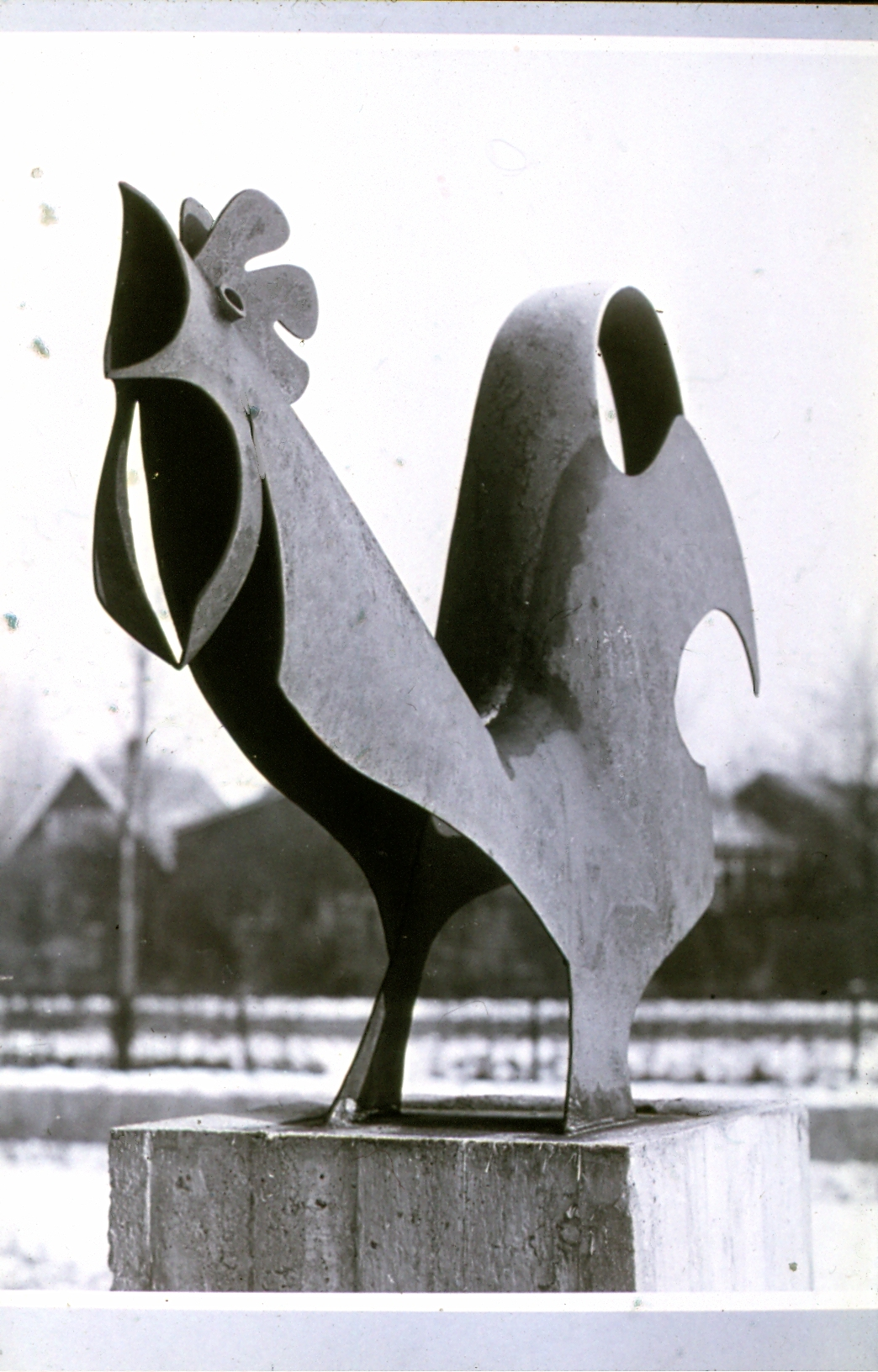
Cock 1979

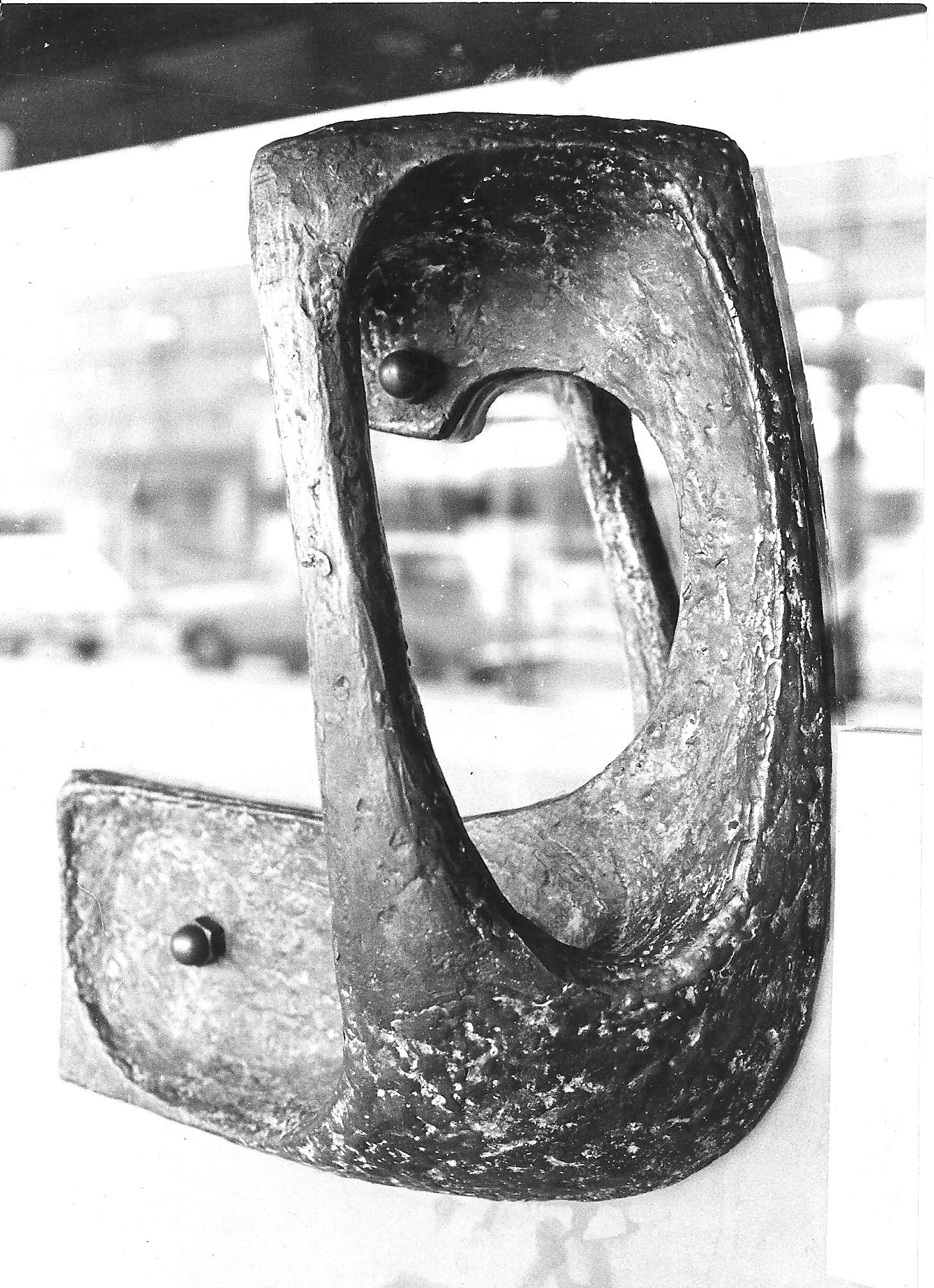
Rabobank 2001

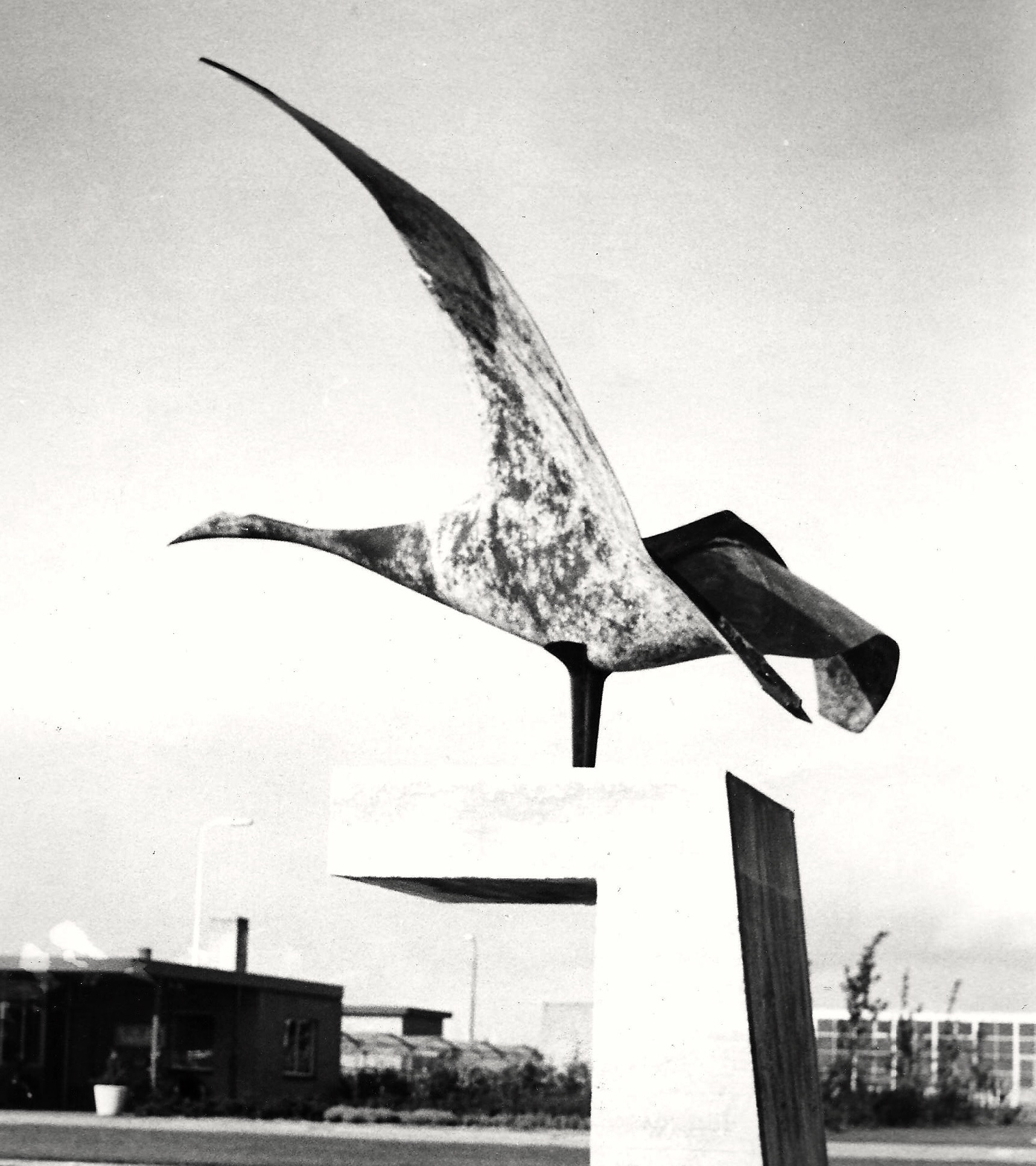
Water fowl 1963

== Bibliography ==
- Kinderen Falke, i.s.m. Joop Falke: Joop Falke, edelsmid. Bloemlezing, 2014. Uitgegeven in eigen beheer (oplage 170 stuks).
- ARTindex Noord-Brabant
