= Joop Zalm =

Dutch weightlifter

Personal information
- Full name: Josephus Wilhelmus "Joop" Zalm
- Born: 13 November 1897 The Hague, the Netherlands
- Died: 5 February 1969 (aged 71) The Hague, the Netherlands

Sport
- Country: Netherlands
- Sport: Weightlifting
- Weight class: Middleweight
- Club: KDO, The Hague
- Updated on 12 December 2016

Josephus Wilhelmus "Joop" Zalm (13 November 1897 – 5 February 1969) was a Dutch male weightlifter, who competed in the Middleweight category and represented the Netherlands at international competitions. He competed at the 1928 Summer Olympics.
