= List of Serbian Americans =

This is a list of notable Serbian Americans, including both original immigrants who obtained American citizenship and their American descendants.

To be included in this list, the person must have a Wikipedia article showing they are Serbian American or must have references showing they are Serbian American and are notable.

== Arts ==
- Marina Abramović, performance artist
- Louis D. Astorino, architect
- Ivana Bašić, sculptor
- Jelena Behrend, jewelry designer
- Rushka Bergman, fashion stylist and editor
- John David Brcin, sculptor
- Tom Carapic, found object artist
- Marek Djordjevic, automobile designer
- Radovan Lale Djuric, painter
- Srdjan Jovanovic Weiss, Serbian-born architect and urban planner
- William Jovanovich, author and publisher Harcourt Brace Jovanovich, Inc.
- Ana Kras, furniture designer, photographer, artist
- Zoran Ladicorbic, fashion designer
- Lili Lakich, neon light artist
- Marjorie Mikasen, painter, author
- Nicholas Petkovich, artist
- Michael Boro Petrovich, academic, translator, scholar, and author
- Ana Prvacki, performance artist
- Gorjana Reidel, jewelry designer
- Alexander Sambugnac, artist, sculptor
- George Styler, fashion designer
- Daniel Vosovic, fashion designer
- Vasa Mihich, sculptor and painter
- Milo Miloradovich, opera singer
- Savo Radulovic, painter and batik artist
- Drenka Willen, editor
- Alma Alexander, fantasy writer
- Branko Mikasinovich, scholar
- Maja Herman Sekulić, writer, translator, poet
- Dana Todorović, writer and translator
- Charles Simic, United States Poet Laureate
- Rose Gojich Stephenson-Goodknight, Wikipedian; visiting scholar
- Dejan Stojanović, poet, writer, essayist
- Milivoy Stoyan Stanoyevich, author

== Business ==
- Nicholas Chabraja, CEO at General Dynamics
- Mitchell M. Duchich, founder of Clover Leaf Dairy Company (Gary, Indiana),
- William Jovanovich, businessman
- Milan Mandarić, businessman
- Phebe Novakovic, businesswoman
- Milan Panić, businessman
- Milan Puskar, entrepreneur, philanthropist
- Steve Popovich, record company executive
- William G. Salatich, executive at Gillette
- Andy Stefanovich, business consultant, author

== Entertainment ==
=== Actors ===
- Sasha Alexander, actress
- Ever Anderson, actress, model
- Coco Austin, glamour model, actress
- Troian Bellisario, actress
- Laura Benanti, actress
- Sara Brajovic, model and actress
- Brad Dexter, actor
- Divine, actor, singer, drag queen
- Milena Govich, actress
- Judy Greer, actress (Serbian paternal grandmother)
- Gloria Grey, actress
- Damian Hurley, actor
- Adrienne Janic, actress, TV presenter
- Milla Jovovich, actress
- Lance LeGault, actor
- Bela Lugosi, actor
- Karl Malden, actor
- Margaret Markov, actress
- Milos Milos, actor, stunt double
- Alex Nesic, actor
- Natalia Nogulich, actress
- Mel Novak, actor
- Catherine Oxenberg, actress
- Iván Petrovich, silent screen star
- Danijela Popović, actress, composer, pianist, pedagogue and playwright.
- Sarah Sokolovic, actress
- Michael Sorich, actor
- Stoya, actress
- Steve Vinovich, actor
- John Vivyan, actor
- Mirjana Joković, actress and drama coach
- Bill Radovich, actor

=== Directors and screenwriters ===
- Sanja Bestic, theatre director, writer, producer
- Peter Bogdanovich, film director, actor, producer, critic
- David Kajganich, screenwriter, producer
- Andre Stojka, actor, screenwriter
- Steve Tesich, screenwriter, playwright
- Slavko Vorkapich, motion-picture montagist
- Marina Zenovich, film producer, film director

=== Musicians ===
- Baruch Arnon, classical pianist
- Marina Arsenijevic, concert pianist and composer
- Dušan Bogdanović, composer, musician
- Muruga Booker, drummer, composer, recording artist
- Del Casher, guitarist, inventor
- Mike Dimkich, punk guitarist
- Kristina Esfandiari, musician
- Dillon Francis, DJ and record producer
- Ivan Ilić, pianist
- Brandon Jovanovich, opera singer
- Lene Lovich, singer-songwriter, musician
- Charlie Marinkovich, singer-songwriter
- Branko Mataja, blues and folk guitarist
- Jelena Mihailović (artistic name JelaCello), cellist
- Milan the Leather Boy, record producer, songwriter, recording artist
- Filip Mitrovic, composer
- Spud Murphy, jazz multi-instrumentalist, bandleader, arranger
- Ana Popović, blues guitarist
- Danijela Popović, actress, composer, pianist, pedagogue and playwright.
- Nikola Resanovic, composer, music professor
- Rudolph Reti, musical analyst, composer, pianist
- Djordje Stijepovic, double bass player and composer
- Aleksandra Vrebalov, composer, musician
- Alexander Zonjic, flutist

== Media ==
- Adam Aleksic, linguist, content creator, writer
- Donald P. Bellisario, television producer
- Gordon Bijelonic, film producer
- Walt Bogdanich, investigative journalist
- Peter Bogdanovich, film producer, director
- Boogie (Vladimir Milivojevich), documentary and portrait photographer
- Ellis Cannon, television personality
- Rasha Drachkovitch, television producer
- Natalie Jacobson, television presenter
- Olgivanna Lloyd Wright, founder/director of the Frank Lloyd Wright Taliesin Fellowship
- Ika Panajotovic, film producer, tennis champion
- Anka Radakovich, magazine columnist
- Milena Rakocević, fashion photographer
- Paul Stojanovich, television producer
- Jill Filipovic, journalist and feminist

== Military ==
- Jake Allex, Army sergeant, World War I, Medal of Honor recipient
- Teresa A. H. Djuric, Air Force brigadier general
- George Fisher, early leader of the Texas Revolution
- Rade Grbitch, Navy seaman, Medal of Honor recipient
- James I. Mestrovitch, Army sergeant, World War I, Medal of Honor recipient
- John W. Minick, Army staff sergeant, World War II, Medal of Honor recipient
- George Musulin, intelligence agent, World War II
- Mitchell Paige, Marines colonel, World War II, Medal of Honor recipient
- Milo Radulovich, Air Force lieutenant
- Lance Sijan, Air Force captain, Vietnam War, Medal of Honor recipient
- Mel Vojvodich, Air Force major general, Vietnam and Korea Wars, decorated
- George Vujnovich, intelligence agent, World War II, decorated

== Politics ==
- Melissa Bean, U.S. representative for Illinois's 8th congressional district from 2005 to 2011
- John C. Begovich, member of the California State Senate
- Rod Blagojevich, the 40th governor of Illinois from 2003 to 2009
- Mark Brnovich, the 26th attorney general of Arizona
- John Dapcevich, mayor of Sitka, Alaska
- Marko Dapcevich, mayor of Sitka, Alaska
- Helen Delich Bentley, U.S. representative for Maryland from 1985 to 1995
- John Gregovich, politician, member of the Nevada State Senate
- George Michael Marovich, United States federal judge
- Mitchell Melich, solicitor of the Department of the Interior and member of the Utah State Senate
- Zack Milkovich, politician, member of the Ohio House of Representatives
- Alex Miller, Alaskan statehood lobbyist
- Frank Peratrovich, politician, member of the Alaska State Legislature
- Zoran Popovich, senior judge on the Superior Court of Pennsylvania
- Mike Pusich, mayor of Douglas, Alaska
- Bill Ray, politician, businessman and writer, member of the Alaska State Legislature
- Mike Stepovich, last territorial governor of Alaska
- George Voinovich, U.S Senator from Ohio from 1999 to 2011
- Rose Ann Vuich, first female member of the California State Senate
- John P. Vukasin Jr., federal judge
- Steve Vukovich, member of the Alaska Territorial Legislature
- George N. Zenovich, member of the California State Senate

== Science ==
- Adam Aleksic, linguist
- Krste Asanović, computer scientist
- Olga Boric-Lubecke, electrical engineer
- Slobodan Ćuk, electrical engineer
- Bernhard Caesar Einstein, physicist
- Marko V. Jaric, physicist
- Drago Jovanovich, designer, inventor of the gyrocopter
- Dusan Krajcinovic, mechanical engineer
- Miroslav Krstić, control theorist
- Bogdan Maglich, experimental nuclear physicist
- Nenad Medvidović, computer scientist
- Mihajlo D. Mesarovic, systems engineering
- Tihomir Novakov, physicist
- Branislav Notaros, electrical engineer
- Mihajlo Pupin, physicist, physical chemist
- Stojan Radic, electrical engineer
- Miodrag Radulovacki, scientist, inventor
- Aleksandar Stanković, electrical engineer
- Dejan Sobajic, electrical engineer
- Nataša Šešum, mathematician
- Nikola Tesla, inventor, electrical engineer, mechanical engineer and futurist
- Bane Vasic, electrical engineer
- Milan Vukcevich, chemist, Grandmaster chess problem composer, writer
- Vladimir Vukićević, software engineer
- John Vukovich, engineer, professor of biomedical engineering at Columbia University
- Dimitrije Đorđević, historian
- Bogdan Denitch, sociologist
- Boyan Jovanovic, economics professor at New York University
- Veselin Kesich, professor of theology and author
- Petar V. Kokotovic, engineering professor at the University of California, Santa Barbara
- Jelena Kovacevic, dean of engineering at NYU’s Tandon School and Carnegie Mellon University
- Rade Paravina, professor with tenure at the University of Texas Health Science Center at Houston, School of Dentistry, and director of the Houston Center for Biomaterials & Biomimetics
- Radovan Kovacevic, professor and inventor
- Gojko Lalic, chemistry professor at the University of Washington
- Alexander Margulis, clinical professor of radiology
- Branko Milanović, economist
- Nada Martinović, professor of music at Kent State University, music pedagogue, conductor, and researcher
- Nikola Moravčević, literary historian, literary critic, academic and novelist
- Anna Novakov, art historian, critic, educator, and curator
- Zorica Pantic, president of Wentworth Institute of Technology
- Nataša Pavlović, mathematics professor at the University of Texas at Austin, Sloan Research Fellow
- Traian Stoianovich, historian and history professor at Rutgers University
- Dragoslav D. Šiljak, engineering professor at Santa Clara University
- Wayne S. Vucinich, historian and professor at Stanford University
- Miloš Velimirović, musicologist, a music professor at Yale University, Professor Emeritus
- Jasmina Vujic, nuclear engineering professor at Berkeley, first female nuclear engineering department chair in the United States
- Gordana Vunjak-Novakovic, biomedicine professor at Columbia University in the City of New York

== Sports ==
=== Football ===
- Bob Babich, NFL player
- Mike Basrak, college football player
- Novo Bojovic, NFL player
- Norm Bulaich, NFL player
- Pete Catan, football player
- Maxx Crosby, NFL player
- Filip Filipović, NFL player
- Bob Gain, NFL player
- Sam Jankovich, GM of the New England Patriots, athletic director at the University of Miami
- Ken Casanega, NFL player, grandson of an Arizona cattle rancher, Tom Casanega (1849-1934), born in Montenegro
- Dragan Kesich, college football player
- Milan Lazetich, NFL player
- Pete Lazetich, NFL player
- Mike Mamula, NFL player
- Jim Mandich, NFL and college football player, College Football Hall of Fame
- Duke Maronic, NFL player
- Scott Milanovich, NFL player
- Rex Mirich, NFL player
- Mike Nixon, NFL coach
- Bob O'Billovich, CFL player and coach
- Ed O'Bradovich, NFL player
- Bo Pelini, coach
- Milt Popovich, NFL player
- Dan Radakovich, NFL player
- Bill Radovich, NFL player
- Dan Rains, NFL player
- Steve Ruzich, NFL player
- Paul Salata, NFL player
- Alex Smith, NFL player
- Alex Stepanovich, NFL player
- Tom Yewcic, NFL player
- Chase Winovich, NFL player

=== Baseball ===
- Erik Bakich, college baseball coach
- Brian Bogusevic, MLB player
- Jess Dobernic, MLB player
- Walt Dropo, MLB player
- Luke Glavenich, MLB player
- Eli Grba, MLB player
- Mike Kekich, MLB player
- Mike Krsnich, MLB player
- Rocky Krsnich, MLB player
- Babe Martin, MLB player
- Doc Medich, MLB player
- Johnny Miljus, MLB player
- Paul Popovich, MLB player
- Ryan Radmanovich, MLB player
- Dave Rajsich, MLB player
- Gary Rajsich, MLB player
- Jeff Samardzija, MLB player
- Nick Strincevich, MLB player
- Pete Suder, MLB player
- Steve Sundra, MLB player
- Steve Swetonic, MLB player
- Joe Tepsic, MLB player
- Peter Vuckovich, MLB player
- George Vukovich, MLB player
- John Vukovich, MLB player and coach
- Christian Yelich, MLB player

=== Basketball ===
- Bob Djokovich, basketball player
- George Glamack, basketball player
- Bato Govedarica, basketball player
- Tim Jankovich, college basketball coach
- Frank Kaminsky, basketball player, parental Serbian heritage
- Nick Lalich, basketball player
- Pete Lalich, basketball player
- Pete Maravich, basketball player
- Press Maravich, basketball player and coach
- Ed Melvin, basketball player and coach
- Dave Pilipovich, college basketball coach
- Gregg Popovich, NBA basketball coach
- Goran Suton, basketball player
- Lou Stefanovic, basketball player
- Sasha Stefanovic, basketball player
- Mike Todorovich, basketball player and coach
- Jim Zeravich, basketball player

=== Soccer ===
- Stefan Antonijevic, soccer player
- Barney Djordjevic, soccer player
- Sacha Kljestan, soccer player
- Djordje Mihailovic, soccer player
- Ilija Mitić, soccer player
- Andrija Novakovich, soccer player
- Veljko Petković, soccer player
- Dragan Popović, soccer player
- Preki, soccer player
- Drew Skundrich, soccer player
- Neven Subotić, soccer player

=== Ice hockey ===
- John Polich, NHL player
- Stan Smrke, NHL player
- Mick Vukota, NHL player
- Alex Nedeljkovic, NHL player
- Scott Perunovich, NHL player

=== Tennis ===
- Aleksandar Kovacevic, tennis player
- Iva Jovic, tennis player

=== Other sports ===
- Otis Dozovic, wrestler
- Milorad Čavić, swimmer
- Jasna Fazlić, table tennis player
- Sam Jankovich, sports administrator
- Pavle Jovanovic, bobsledder
- Trevor Matich, football analyst
- Stevan Mićić, wrestler
- Chad Muska, skateboarder
- Radomir Petković wrestler (aka King Constantine)
- Rhonda Rajsich, racquetball player
- Pete Romcevich, racecar driver
- Katarina Simonović, swimmer
- Sandra Spuzich, golfer
- Bojana Todorović, volleyball player
- Ognjen Topic, Muay Thai boxer
- Kristal Uzelac, gymnast
- Bill Vukovich, automobile racing driver, Serb parentage. Father of Bill Vukovich II and grandfather of Billy Vukovich III.
- Trifun Živanović, figure skater
- Anastasija Zolotic, taekwondoist, Olympic gold medalist
- Zoran Zorkic, golfer

== Other ==
- George Fisher, explorer and early leader of the Texas Revolution
- John Hajdukovich, pioneer and entrepreneur
- Christopher Kovacevich, metropolitan bishop
- Mateja Matejić, priest
- Varnava Nastić, bishop of Hvosno and Orthodox saint
- Stephen Yokich, American labor union activist, President of the United Auto Workers

== See also ==
- List of Serbian Canadians
- List of Serbs

== Sources ==
- Vuković, Sava (1998). History of the Serbian Orthodox Church in America and Canada 1891–1941. Kragujevac: Kalenić.
