= List of Serbian NBA players =

List of Serbian players

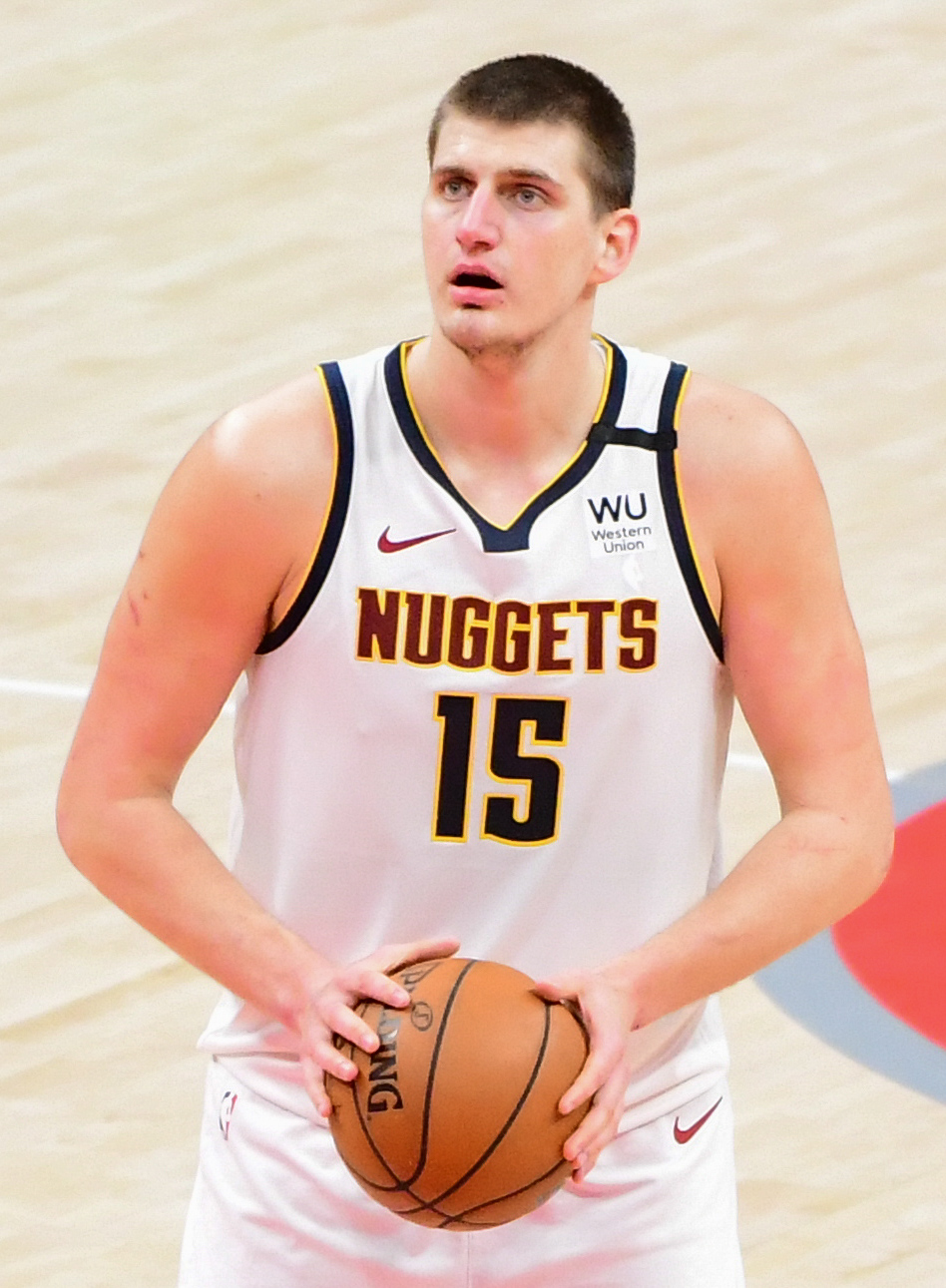
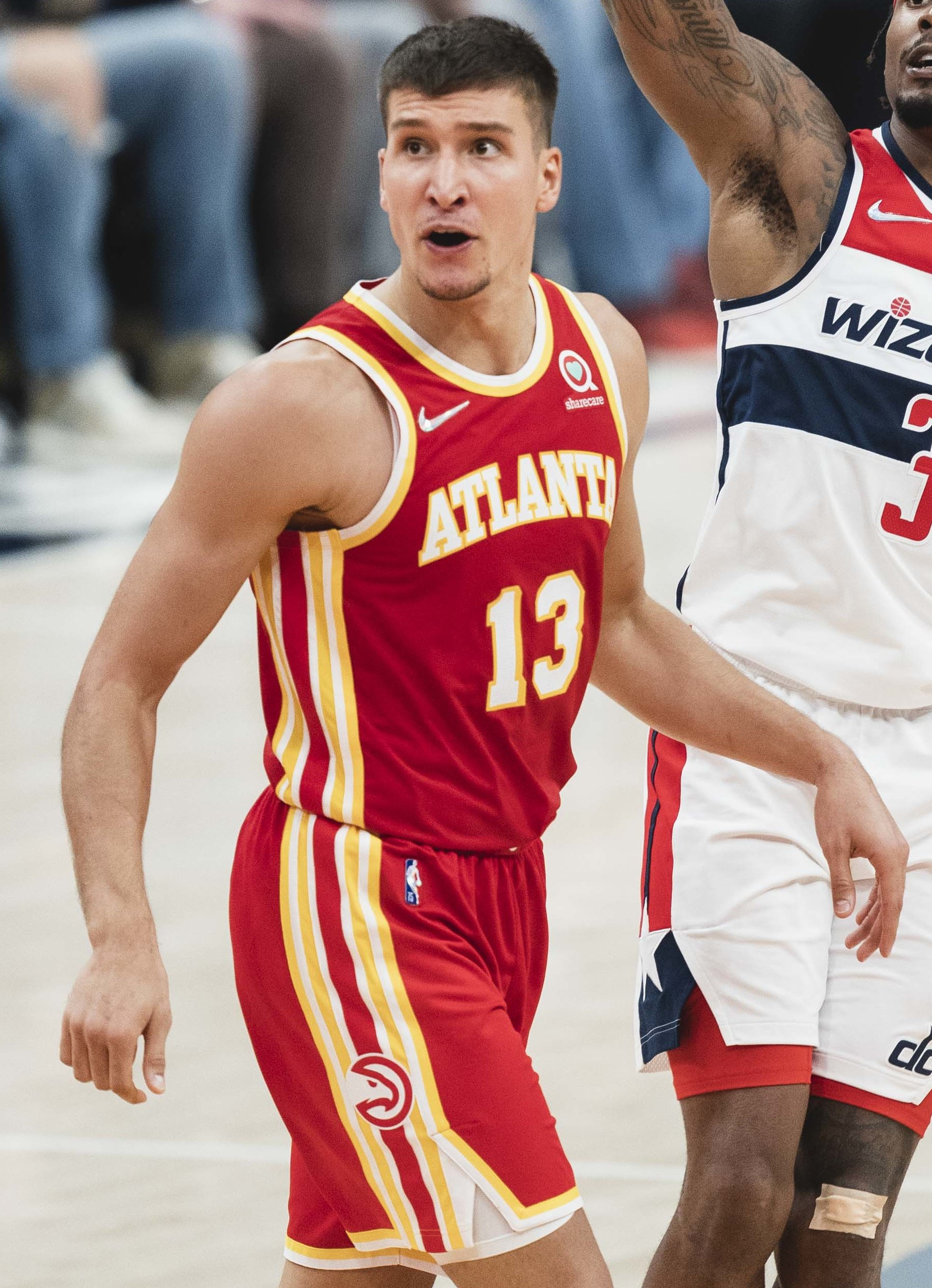
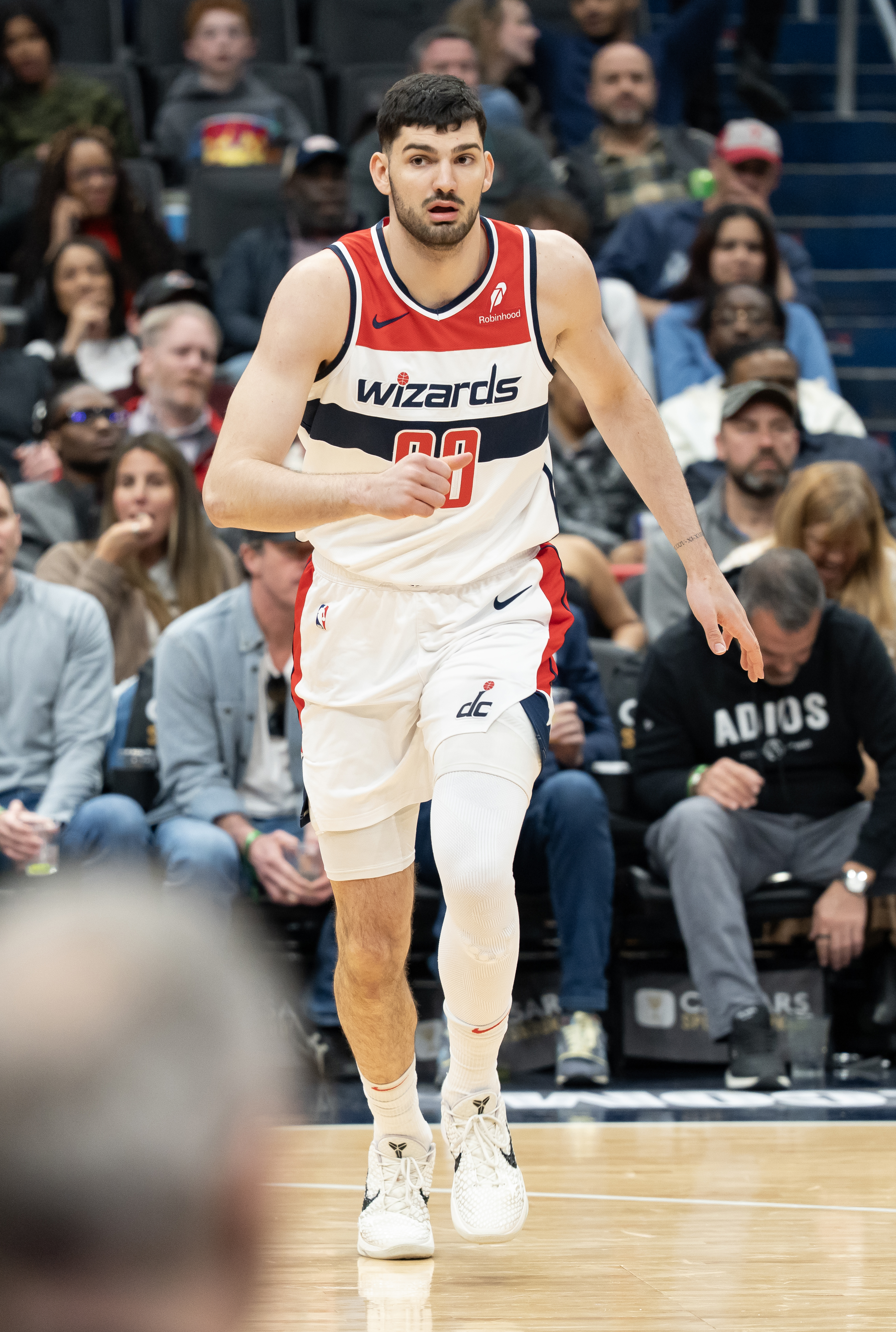
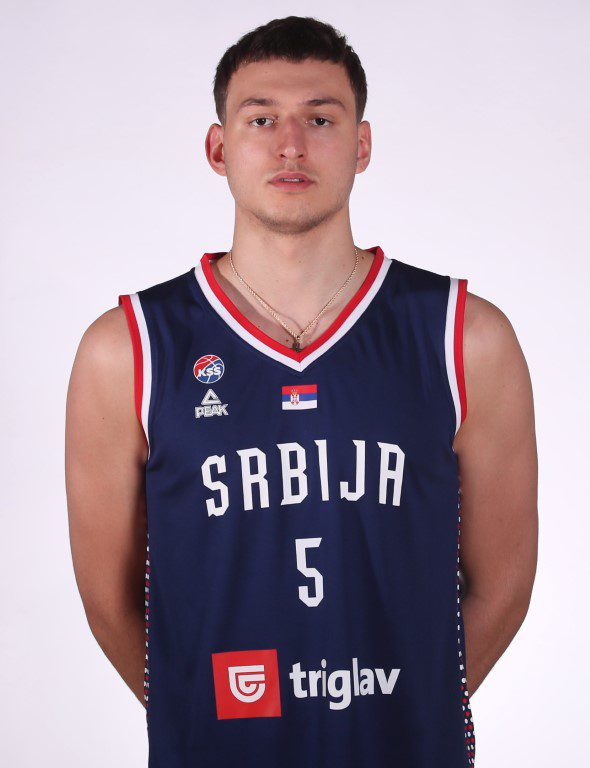
Nikola Jokić, Bogdan Bogdanović, Tristan Vukčević and Nikola Jović are current NBA players.

The following is a list of Serbian basketball players that play or have played in the National Basketball Association (NBA).

The first American player of Serbian descent to play in the NBA was Bato Govedarica, who played 23 games for the Syracuse Nationals during the 1953–54 NBA season. In the 1970s Pete Maravich became the first player of Serbian descent to enter an All Star game (five times) and to be elected into an All-NBA team (four times). Dražen Dalipagić was the first player to come from Serbia to be on trial with an NBA team, with the Boston Celtics in 1976, but, despite general manager Red Auerbach calling him an "NBA star material", he wasn't signed due to his "inability to communicate with the coach and his fellow players". Center Vlade Divac and forward Žarko Paspalj were the first players from Serbia to play in the NBA, in the 1989–90 season. In his second season, Divac became the first Serb to play in the NBA finals. In 2004, Darko Miličić became the first basketball player from Serbia to win an NBA championship. Since then, Predrag Stojaković, Ognjen Kuzmić, Nemanja Bjelica, Nikola Jokić, and Nikola Topić won the league in 2011, 2015, 2022, 2023, and 2025, respectively.

Nikola Jokić is the Serbian player with most NBA honours and in 2021 he became the first Serb, and only the third European, to win the NBA Most Valuable Player Award. In 2022, Jokić was named the NBA MVP for the second year in a row, becoming the 13th player to win the award in consecutive seasons, as well as the second European player to win the award more than once, joining Giannis Antetokounmpo. In 2024, Jokić became the first non-American player to win the MVP award three times. In 2023, he became the first Serbian to be named Finals MVP.

== Active players ==
The following is a list of current NBA players.

Note: This list is correct through the start of the 2026–27 regular season.

Entry Year	Player	Draft Year (Pick)	Drafted by	Current team	Former team(s) (Years)	Se.	SGP	PGP	Honours (Note: This section doesn't include overseas honours, NBA D-League honours, NBA finals entry and various types of records.)	Ref.
2015	Nikola Jokić	2014 (#41)	Denver Nuggets	Denver Nuggets (2015–present)	None	11	810	94	55 honours: NBA champion (2023); NBA MVP (2021, 2022, 2024); Finals MVP (2023); Conference Finals MVP (2023); All-Star (2019–2026); All-NBA First Team (2019, 2021, 2022, 2024, 2025); All-NBA Second Team (2020, 2023); Rookie First Team (2016); 9× Player of the Month (Note: 1) December/January 2021, 2) March 2021, 3) January 2022, 4) March/April 2022, 5) January 2023, 6) February 2023 7) November 2023 8) January 2025 9) October/November 2025); 20× Player of the Week (Note: 1) November 6–12, 2017, 2) April 2–8, 2018, 3) October 16–21, 2018, 4) December 31 – January 6, 2019, 5) January 28 – February 3, 2019, 6) February 3–9, 2020, 7) January 18–24, 2021, 8) January 25–31, 2021, 9) March 15–21, 2021, 10) January 17–23, 2022, 11) March 28 – April 3, 2022, 12) December 12–18, 2022 13) October 24–29, 2023 14) April 8–14 15) November 4–10 16) December 30 – January 5 17) February 3 – February 9 18) November 3–9, 2025 19) November 10–16, 2025 20) March 23–29, 2026); Rising Stars (2016, 2017); Skills Challenge (2017, 2019)	
2017	Bogdan Bogdanović	2014 (#27)	Phoenix Suns	Houston Rockets (2026–present)	3 teams: Sacramento Kings (2017–2020); Atlanta Hawks (2020–2025); Los Angeles Clippers (2025–2026)	9	526	35	4 honours: Rookie Second Team (2018); Rising Stars MVP (2018); Rising Stars (2018, 2019)	
2022	Nikola Jović (Note: Jović is born in England, UK, to Serbian parents.)	2022 (#27)	Miami Heat	Miami Heat (2022–present)	None	4	154	16	—	
2024	Tristan Vukčević (Note: Vukčević is born in Italy to Bosnian-Serbian father and Swedish mother.) (Note: Also holds the Greek citizenship)	2023 (#42)	Washington Wizards	Washington Wizards (2024–present)	None	3	94	0	—	
2024	Nikola Topić	2024 (#12)	Oklahoma City Thunder	Oklahoma City Thunder (2024–present)	None	2 (Note: Topić missed entire 2024–25 season due to injury.)	10	0	NBA champion (2025)	
2026	Bogoljub Marković	2025 (#47)	Milwaukee Bucks	Milwaukee Bucks (2026–present)	None	0	0	0		

== Former players ==
The following is a list of former NBA players.

Years	Player	Draft Year (Pick)	Drafted by	Team(s) (Years)	Se.	SGP	PGP	Honours	Ref.
1989–2005	Vlade Divac	1989 (#26)	Los Angeles Lakers	3 teams: Los Angeles Lakers (1989–1996); Charlotte Hornets (1996–1998); Sacramento Kings (1998–2004); Los Angeles Lakers (2004–2005)	16	1134	121	6 honours: Hall of Fame (2019); All-Star (2001); J. Walter Kennedy Award (2000); Rookie First Team (1990); No. 21 retired by Kings; 1× Player of the Week	
1989–1990	Žarko Paspalj (Note: Born in SR Montenegro, Yugoslavia)	1988	Undrafted	San Antonio Spurs (1989–1990)	1	28	0	—	
1990–1991	Miloš Babić	1990 (#50)	Phoenix Suns	2 teams: Cleveland Cavaliers (1990–1991); Miami Heat (1991)	2	21	0	—	
1992–1993	Radisav Ćurčić	1987	Undrafted	Dallas Mavericks (1992–1993)	1	20	0	—	
1995–1997	Predrag Danilović (Note: Born in SR Bosnia and Herzegovina, Yugoslavia)	1992 (#43)	Golden State Warriors	2 teams: Miami Heat (1995–1997); Dallas Mavericks (1997)	2	75	3	—	
1995–1996	Rastko Cvetković	1992	Undrafted	Denver Nuggets (1995–1996)	1	14	0	—	
1996	Aleksandar Đorđević	1989	Undrafted	Portland Trail Blazers (1996)	1	8	0	—	
1998–2011	Predrag Stojaković (Note: Born in SR Croatia, Yugoslavia)	1996 (#14)	Sacramento Kings	5 teams: Sacramento Kings (1998–2006); Indiana Pacers (2006); New Orleans Hornets (2006–2010); Toronto Raptors (2010–2011); Dallas Mavericks (2011)	13	804	95	16 honours: NBA champion (2011); All-Star (2002–2004); All-NBA Second Team (2004); No. 16 retired by Kings; 1× Player of the Month; 2× Player of the Week; Three-Point Contest champion (2002, 2003); Three-Point Contest (2001–2004, 2008)	
2000–2001	Dragan Tarlać	1995 (#31)	Chicago Bulls	Chicago Bulls (2000–2001)	1	43	0	—	
2001–2013	Vladimir Radmanović	2001 (#12)	Seattle SuperSonics	7 teams: Seattle SuperSonics (2001–2006); Los Angeles Clippers (2006); Los Angeles Lakers (2006–2009); Charlotte Bobcats (2009); Golden State Warriors (2009–2011); Atlanta Hawks (2011–2012); Chicago Bulls (2012–2013)	12	737	47	2 honours: Rookie Second Team (2002); Three-Point Contest (2005)	
2001–2007	Željko Rebrača	1994 (#54)	Seattle SuperSonics	3 teams: Detroit Pistons (2001–2004); Atlanta Hawks (2004); Los Angeles Clippers (2004–2007)	6	215	12	3 honours: Rookie Second Team (2002); Rising Stars (2002); 1× Rookie of the month	
2002–2009	Marko Jarić	2000 (#30)	Los Angeles Clippers	3 teams: Los Angeles Clippers (2002–2005); Minnesota Timberwolves (2005–2008); Memphis Grizzlies (2008–2009)	7	447	0	2 honours: Rising Stars (2003, 2004)	
2002–2003	Predrag Savović	2002	Undrafted	Denver Nuggets (2002–2003)	1	27	0	—	
2002–2003	Igor Rakočević	2000 (#51)	Minnesota Timberwolves	Minnesota Timberwolves (2002–2003)	1	42	0	—	
2003–2013	Darko Miličić	2003 (#2)	Detroit Pistons	6 teams: Detroit Pistons (2003–2006); Orlando Magic (2006–2007); Memphis Grizzlies (2007–2009); New York Knicks (2009–2010); Minnesota Timberwolves (2010–2012); Boston Celtics (2012)	10	468	21	NBA champion (2004)	
2003–2013	Aleksandar Pavlović	2003 (#19)	Utah Jazz	7 teams: Utah Jazz (2003–2004); Cleveland Cavaliers (2004–2009); Minnesota Timberwolves (2009–2010); Dallas Mavericks (2011); New Orleans Hornets (2011); Boston Celtics (2011–2012); Portland Trail Blazers (2012–2013)	10	567	52	—	
2004–2011	Nenad Krstić	2002 (#43)	New Jersey Nets	3 teams: New Jersey Nets (2004–2008); Oklahoma City Thunder (2008–2011); Boston Celtics (2011)	7	419	28	2 honours: Rookie Second Team (2005); Rising Stars (2003)	
2006–2007	Mile Ilić	2005 (#43)	New Jersey Nets	New Jersey Nets (2006–2007)	1	5	0	—	
2007–2008	Kosta Perović	2006 (#38)	Golden State Warriors	Golden State Warriors (2007–2008)	1	7	0	—	
2013–2015	Ognjen Kuzmić	2012 (#52)	Golden State Warriors	Golden State Warriors (2013–2015)	2	37	3	NBA champion (2015)	
2013–2014; 2015	Miroslav Raduljica	2010	Undrafted	2 teams: Milwaukee Bucks (2013–2014); Minnesota Timberwolves (2015)	2	53	0	—	
2015–2022	Nemanja Bjelica	2010 (#35)	Washington Wizards	4 teams: Minnesota Timberwolves (2015–2018); Sacramento Kings (2018–2021); Miami Heat (2021); Golden State Warriors (2021–2022)	7	449	22	NBA champion (2022)	
2017–2019	Miloš Teodosić	2009	Undrafted	Los Angeles Clippers (2017–2019)	2	60	0	—	

=== Players who are still active overseas ===
Years	Player	Draft Year (Pick)	Drafted by	Team(s) (Years)	Se.	SGP	PGP	Honours	Current club	Ref.
2013–2014	Nemanja Nedović	2013 (#30)	Phoenix Suns	Golden State Warriors (2013–2014)	1	24	1	—	Free agent	
2015–2024	Boban Marjanović	2010	Undrafted	6 teams: San Antonio Spurs (2015–2016); Detroit Pistons (2016–2018); Los Angeles Clippers (2018–2019); Philadelphia 76ers (2019); Dallas Mavericks (2019–2022); Houston Rockets (2022–2024)	9	331	31	—	Free agent	
2019–2020	Marko Gudurić	2017	Undrafted	Memphis Grizzlies (2019–2020)	1	44	0	—	Olimpia Milano, Italy	
2019–2021	Alen Smailagić	2019 (#39)	New Orleans Pelicans	Golden State Warriors (2019–2021)	2	29	0	—	Galatasaray, Turkey	
2020–2024	Aleksej Pokuševski	2020 (#17)	Minnesota Timberwolves	2 teams: Oklahoma City Thunder (2020–2024); Charlotte Hornets (2024)	4	168	0	—	Lokomotiv Kuban, Russia	
2023	Filip Petrušev	2021 (#50)	Philadelphia 76ers	2 teams: Philadelphia 76ers (2023); Sacramento Kings (2023)	1	3	0	—	Dubai Basketball, Adriatic	
2023–2025	Vasilije Micić	2014 (#52)	Philadelphia 76ers	3 teams: Oklahoma City Thunder (2023–2024); Charlotte Hornets (2024–2025); Phoenix Suns (2025)	2	101	0	—	Hapoel Tel Aviv, Israel	

== Drafted players ==
The following is a list of drafted players who have never appeared in an NBA regular season or playoff game.

Draft Year (Pick)	Player	Drafted by	Status
1985 (#97)	Ljubiša Stefanović	Seattle SuperSonics	Retired, played his entire career overseas
1995 (#51)	Dejan Bodiroga	Sacramento Kings (Note: The Kings renounced their draft rights to Bodiroga in July 2017, ten years after his retirement as a player.)	Retired, played his entire career overseas
2002 (#36)	Miloš Vujanić	New York Knicks, rights traded to the Phoenix Suns	Retired, played his entire career overseas
2007 (#60)	Milovan Raković	Dallas Mavericks, rights traded to the Portland Trail Blazers	Retired, played his entire career overseas
2008 (#53)	Tadija Dragićević	Utah Jazz, rights traded to the New York Knicks	Retired, played his entire career overseas
2011 (#54)	Milan Mačvan	Cleveland Cavaliers	Retired, played his entire career overseas
2014 (#54)	Nemanja Dangubić	Philadelphia 76ers, rights traded to the Memphis Grizzlies	Currently playing for Dubai, Adriatic
2015 (#26)	Nikola Milutinov	San Antonio Spurs, rights traded to the Brooklyn Nets	Currently playing for Olympiacos, Greece
2015 (#57)	Nikola Radičević	Denver Nuggets, rights traded to the New York Knicks	Currently playing for Joventut Badalona, Spain
2015 (#60)	Luka Mitrović	Philadelphia 76ers, rights traded to the New York Knicks	Currently playing for Bahçeşehir, Turkey
2016 (#35)	Rade Zagorac	Boston Celtics, rights traded to the Memphis Grizzlies (Note: Zagorac signed by the Grizzlies in 2017 to be waived by the team subsequently without a single game played.)	Currently free agent
2017 (#58)	Ognjen Jaramaz	New York Knicks	Currently playing for Lietkabelis Panevėžys, Lithuania
2019 (#60)	Vanja Marinković	Sacramento Kings, rights traded to the Los Angeles Clippers	Currently playing for Partizan, Serbia
2021 (#57)	Balša Koprivica	Charlotte Hornets, rights traded to the Oklahoma City Thunder	Currently playing for San Pablo Burgos, Spain
2024 (#43)	Nikola Đurišić (Note: Đurišić is born in Belgium, to Serbian parents.)	Miami Heat, rights traded to the Atlanta Hawks	Currently playing for Crvena zvezda, Serbia

== Undrafted Summer League players ==
The following is a list of undrafted players who have never appeared in an NBA regular season or playoff game, but have played in the NBA Summer League or its predecessors.

Player	Invited by (Years)	Status	Ref.
Dražen Dalipagić (Note: Dalipagić was on a trial with the Celtics in the summer of 1976; the Summer League has not yet been introduced at the time.)	Boston Celtics (1976)	Retired, played his entire career overseas	
Dejan Koturović	Phoenix Suns (2003)	Retired, played his entire career overseas	
Marko Jovanović	Detroit Pistons (2006)	Retired, played his entire career overseas	
Ivan Radenović	Los Angeles Clippers (2007)	Retired, played his entire career overseas	
Nikola Dragović	New Orleans Pelicans (2010)	Retired, played his entire career overseas	
Andreja Milutinović	Milwaukee Bucks (2013)	Retired, played his entire career overseas	
Marko Kešelj	Portland Trail Blazers (2015)	Retired, played his entire career overseas	
Stefan Nastić	2 teams: Golden State Warriors (2015); San Antonio Spurs (2015)	Retired, played his entire career overseas	
Vlado Janković	New Orleans Pelicans (2016)	Retired, played his entire career overseas	
Nikola Jovanović	3 teams: Detroit Pistons (2016) (Note: Jovanović signed by the Pistons in September 2016 but was waived on October 17 after appearing in one preseason game.); Los Angeles Lakers (2016); Chicago Bulls (2017)	Currently playing for Vienna, Austria	
Stefan Janković	Miami Heat (2017) (Note: On July 13, 2016, Janković signed with the Heat, but was later waived on October 17 after appearing in one preseason game.)	Currently playing for Taipei Fubon Braves, Taiwan	
Dejan Todorović	Chicago Bulls (2017)	Currently playing for El Calor de Cancún, Mexico	
Aleksandar Stefanović (Note: Stefanović is born in the United States to Serbian father. Also, holds American citizenship.) (Note: Stefanović's father Ljubiša Stefanović was the first Serbian player to be drafted to the NBA in 1985.)	San Antonio Spurs (2022)	Retired, played his entire career overseas	
Boriša Simanić	Utah Jazz (2022)	Currently playing for Mitteldeutscher, Germany	
Uroš Plavšić	Atlanta Hawks (2023)	Currently playing for U-BT Cluj-Napoca, Romania	
Uroš Trifunović	Houston Rockets (2025)	Currently playing for Türk Telekom, Turkey	
Lazar Stefanović	Orlando Magic (2025)	Currently playing for Igokea, Bosnia and Herzegovina	
Stefan Todorović	Philadelphia 76ers (2025)	Currently playing for Ilirija, Slovenia	

== Players with Serbian citizenship or parentage ==
The following is a list of players, that play or have played in the NBA, who have citizenship of Serbia or Serbian parentage or who are Serbs of former Yugoslav republics (Bosnia and Herzegovina, Croatia, Montenegro, North Macedonia, Slovenia).

*	Denotes player who is still active in the NBA

Note: This list is correct through the start of the 2026–27 regular season.

Nationality	Relation	Player	Draft Year (Pick)	Drafted by	Year(s)	Team(s)	Se.	SGP	ASP	PGP	Ref.
Bosnia and Herzegovina	Bosnian Serb	Aleksandar Radojević	1999 (#12)	Toronto	1999–2000; 2004–2005	Toronto, Utah	2	15	0	0	
Bosnia and Herzegovina	Bosnian Serb; Citizenship	Ratko Varda	2001	Undrafted	2001–2002	Detroit	1	1	0	0	
Croatia	Serbian father	Dražen Petrović	1986 (#60)	Portland	1989–1993	Portland, New Jersey	4	290	0	29	
Israel	Citizenship; Serbian father	Deni Avdija*	2020 (#9)	Washington	2020–present	Washington, Portland	6	425	1	0	
Montenegro	SR Serbia-born; Citizenship	Žarko Čabarkapa	2003 (#17)	Phoenix	2003–2006	Phoenix, Golden State	3	150	0	0	
Montenegro	Citizenship; Montenegrin Serb	Nikola Peković	2008 (#31)	Minnesota	2010–2017	Minnesota	7	271	0	0	
Montenegro	Citizenship	Slavko Vraneš	2003 (#39)	New York	2004	Portland	1	1	0	0	
Montenegro	Serbian parents (Note: Vučević is born in Switzerland to Serbian parents from Montenegro and Bosnia. Also, holds Belgian citizenship.)	Nikola Vučević*	2011 (#16)	Philadelphia	2011–present	Philadelphia, Orlando, Chicago, Boston, Orlando	15	1036	2	16	
Netherlands	Serbian mother	Dan Gadzuric	2002 (#34)	Milwaukee	2002–2012	Milwaukee, Golden State, New Jersey, New York	10	527	0	12	
North Macedonia	Citizenship	Pero Antić	2004	Undrafted	2013–2015	Atlanta	2	113	0	22	
Slovenia	Serbian father	Luka Dončić*	2018 (#3)	Atlanta	2018–present	Dallas, LA Lakers	8	514	6	55	
Slovenia	Serbian father	Goran Dragić	2008 (#45)	San Antonio	2008–2023	Phoenix, Houston, Miami, Toronto, Brooklyn, Chicago, Milwaukee	15	946	1	62	
Slovenia	Serbian father	Zoran Dragić	2011	Undrafted	2014–2015	Phoenix, Miami	1	16	0	0	
Slovenia	Serbian father	Marko Milič	1997 (#33)	Philadelphia	1997–1999	Phoenix	2	44	0	0	
Slovenia	Slovenian Serb	Radoslav Nesterović	1998 (#17)	Minnesota	1998–2010	Minnesota, San Antonio, Toronto, Indiana	12	811	0	64	
Slovenia	Serbian father	Sasha Vujačić	2004 (#27)	LA Lakers	2004–2011, 2014, 2015–2017	LA Lakers, New Jersey, LA Clippers, New York	10	581	0	65	
Spain	Montenegrin Serb	Nikola Mirotić	2011 (#23)	Houston	2014–2019	Chicago, New Orleans, Milwaukee	5	319	0	40	
Turkey	Serbian mother (Note: Ethnic Bosniaks of Serbia)	Cedi Osman	2015 (#31)	Minnesota	2017–2024	Cleveland, San Antonio	7	476	0	19	
Turkey	SR Serbia-born; Citizenship	Mirsad Türkcan	1998 (#18)	Houston	1999–2000	New York, Milwaukee	1	17	0	2	
Turkey	Serbian parents	Hedo Türkoğlu	2000 (#16)	Sacramento	2000–2015	Sacramento, San Antonio, Orlando, Toronto, Phoenix, LA Clippers	15	997	0	98	
United States	Serbian parents	Bato Govedarica	1951 (#24)	Syracuse	1953–1954	Syracuse	1	23	0	0	
United States	Citizenship	Charles Jenkins	2011 (#44)	Golden State	2011–2013	Golden State, Philadelphia	2	110	0	0	
United States	Serbian mother	Frank Kaminsky	2015 (#9)	Charlotte	2015–2023	Charlotte, Phoenix, Atlanta, Houston	8	413	0	17	
United States	Serbian father	John Konchar	2019	Undrafted	2019–2026	Memphis, Utah	7	363	0	18	
United States	Serbian parents	Pete Lalich	—	Undrafted	1946	Cleveland	1	1	0	0	
United States	Serbian father	Pete Maravich	1970 (#3)	Atlanta	1970–1980	Atlanta, New Orleans, Boston	10	658	5	26	
United States	Serbian parents	Press Maravich	—	Undrafted	1946–1947	Pittsburgh	1	51	0	0	
United States	Citizenship	DeMarcus Nelson	2008	Undrafted	2008–2009	Golden State	1	13	0	0	
United States	Citizenship	Marcus Paige	2016 (#55)	Brooklyn	2017–2018	Charlotte	1	5	0	0	

== See also ==
- List of European basketball players in the United States
- List of National Basketball Association players by country
- List of Croatian NBA players
- List of Montenegrin NBA players
- List of Serbian WNBA players
- List of Serbian NBA coaches

== Notes ==
Details

Other nationalities, ethnic groups
