= Autobiography of Values =

1977 book by Charles Lindbergh

- Author: Charles Lindbergh; William Jovanovich (editor); Judith Schiff (coeditor)
- Language: English
- Genre: Autobiography
- Publisher: Harcourt Brage Jovanovich
- Publication date: January 23, 1977
- Publication place: United States
- Pages: 423
- ISBN: 0-151-10202-3
- Dewey Decimal: 629.13/092/4 B
- LC Class: TL540.L5 A27 1978

Autobiography of Values is a book by the American aviator Charles Lindbergh, edited by William Jovanovich and published posthumously in 1977.

== Summary ==
The book was edited by Lindbergh's friend William Jovanovich from more than 2000 pages Lindbergh left when he died in 1974. The material includes Lindbergh's thoughts about the future of aviation, such as the Arctic route between North America and Asia and the improvement of rocket-powered aircraft. In political affairs, the book affirms Lindbergh's opposition to American participation in World War II and his view of Nazi Germany as less bad than the Soviet Union. The book also deals with Lindbergh's search for what he called a "return to essential life-stream values", which he associated with wilderness and with breaking the dichotomy between primitive life and civilization.

== Reception ==
Kirkus Reviews called the book "Lindbergh's last communion with the cosmos" and described it as more of a monologue than a memoir. The critic wrote that Lindbergh "lacked vision in human affairs", and the book contains very little about people, but in "the air, he is observant unto eloquence".

Eric F. Goldman of The New York Times called the editing a triumph, despite repetitions and a lack of proportionality between subjects. Goldberg wrote that some of Lindbergh's "philosophizing" is "just plain awful", characterized by views popular in the United States of the early 1900s when Lindbergh came of age, and by the influence of the biologist Alexis Carrel, whose writings about "genetic memory" affected Lindbergh in the 1930s. Despite his concerns, Goldberg wrote that the book is relevant as a collection of beautiful and powerful reflections from a major craftsman of "technological civilization".

Francis Russell wrote for the Modern Age that the book is characterized by a stoic attitude. He described it as "a brave book, a document of our times by a man of penetrating if rough-formed intellect, written with a singular clarity of style and feeling".
