= Vusovich =

Vusovich is a Belarusian surname. Notable people with the surname include:

- Ilona Vusovich (born 1982), Belarusian sprinter
- Sviatlana Vusovich (born 1980), Belarusian sprinter, sister of Ilona

== See also ==
- Vukovich
