= H. L. D. Kirkham =

American plastic surgeon

Harold Laurens Dundas Kirkham
- Born: 24 March 1887; Norfolk, England
- Died: March 18, 1949 (aged 61); Houston, Texas, USA
- Occupation: Plastic surgeon
- Spouses: Julia Buchel (m. 1911; died 1927): Margaret Shelton Shimin
- Children: 4

Harold Laurens Dundas Kirkham LOM (24 March 1887 – 18 March 1949) was an Anglo-American plastic surgeon. He was the first Professor of Plastic Surgery at Baylor University, Texas and also served with the US Navy Medical Corps, becoming head of plastic surgery at the United States Naval Medical Center San Diego during the Second World War.

== Early life ==
Harold Kirkham was born on 24 March 1887 in Norfolk, England. His father, Frederick William Kirkham, was also a noted surgeon who had emigrated to Texas in 1901, and Harold, upon completing his education in England at Bedford Modern School in 1904, immediately joined his father and enrolled as a medical student at the University of Texas.

== Civilian career ==
After graduation, Kirkham became company surgeon for the St. Louis, Brownsville and Mexico Railway (1910-1917). At the same time, he also developed his own private practice and began to specialize in the treatment of congenitally acquired facial disfigurements. In 1917, he became Professor of Anatomy and Oral Surgery at the Texas Dental College, a position he held until 1932. He returned to academic life in 1943 at Baylor University, where he established and developed the plastic surgery department at the University's Medical School.

== Military career ==
In 1917, Kirkham had joined the US Navy Medical Corps and became chief of surgery at the Naval Medical Center Portsmouth at Hampton Roads, Virginia; at the end of the war, he maintained his commission in the US Naval Reserve. In 1925, he returned to England for a year to study with Harold Gillies, who had pioneered the treatment of burn victims in the Royal Navy during the war. On 25 December 1941, he was called up and served throughout the war – both on board ships and at the US Navy hospital at San Diego, where he became chief plastic surgeon. He retired from the Navy in 1947 with the rank of captain.

== Honours and awards ==
In 1946, Kirkham was awarded the United States Legion of Merit for the life-saving surgery he performed on sailors in the Pacific as well as the rehabilitation work he undertook at San Diego. In 1947, he received a commendation from the Surgeon General of the Navy for his outstanding devotion to duty in the aftermath of the Texas City Disaster. Kirkham was a Fellow of numerous medical institutions, including the Association of Military Surgeons of the United States. He was a founding member of the American Board of Plastic Surgery and was President of the Texas Surgical Society in 1926 and 1930.

== Other Pursuits ==
Kirkham was a fine musician and played the violin in the Houston Symphony Orchestra for several seasons. He was also a talented artist and one of his works, The Three Monks, was exhibited in New York. In addition, he was an excellent golfer and won several amateur titles.

== Personal life ==
Kirkham married Julia Buchel in Cuero, Texas in 1911; she died in 1927. His second marriage was to Margaret Shelton Shimin of Richmond Texas. Harold Kirkham died on 18 March 1949 of heart disease. He left his wife, one son, and three daughters.
