= Aleksandar Stanković =

Aleksandar Stanković (Serbian Cyrillic: Александар Станковић) may refer to:

- Aleksandar Stanković Lala, Yugoslav Partisan
- Aleksandar Stanković (footballer, born 1998), Serbian football player, goalkeeper
- Aleksandar Stanković (footballer, born 2005), Serbian football player
- Aleksandar Stanković (general), Serbian general
- Aleksandar Stanković (journalist), Croatian TV host and journalist
- Alex M. Stanković, Serbian-born American engineer
