= Walt Anderson (American football) =

American football referee (born 1952)

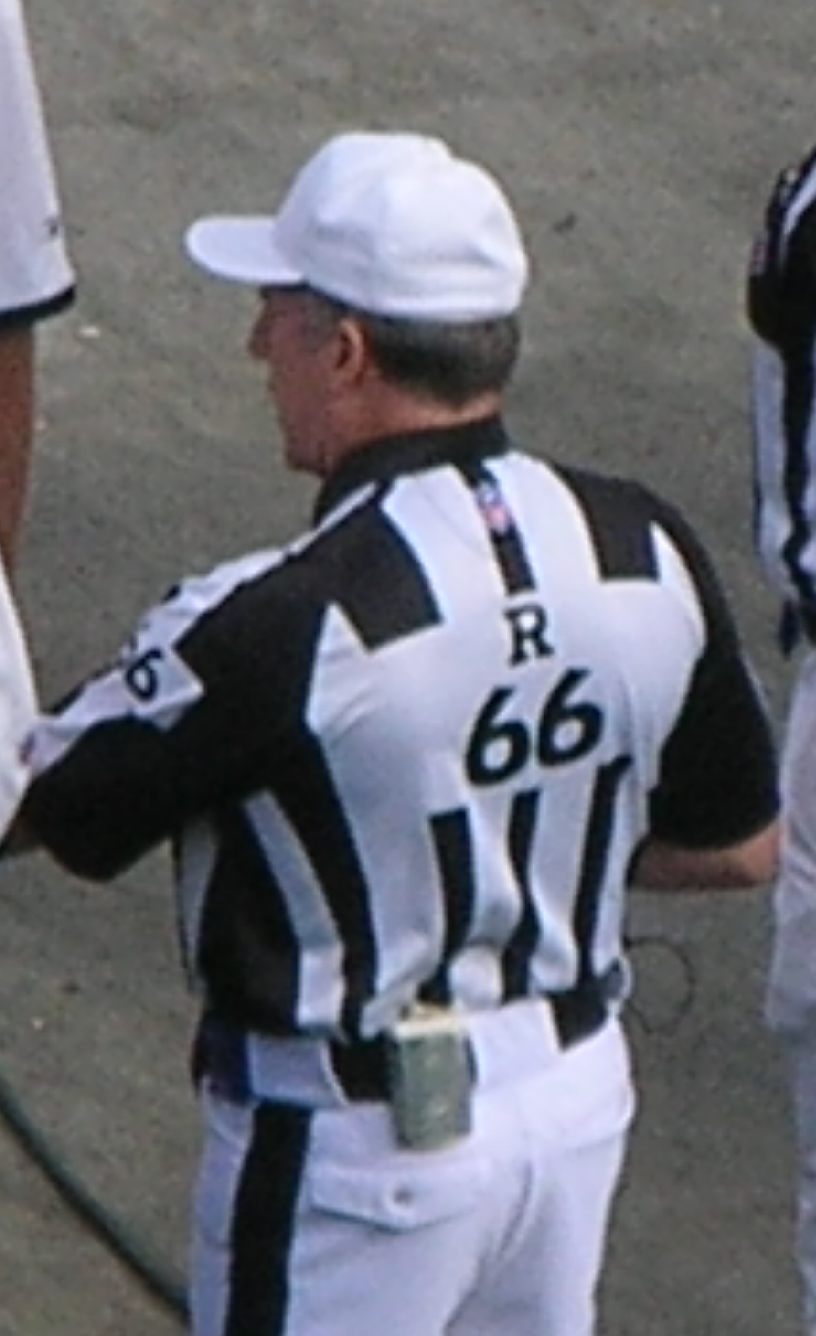
- Anderson in 2008
- Born: Walter John Anderson; September 29, 1952 (age 73); DeFuniak Springs, Florida, U.S.
- Education: UTHealth School of Dentistry (Doctorate of Dentistry, 1978); Sam Houston State University (Bachelor's degree, 1974)
- Occupations: NFL Officiating & Rules Analyst (2024–present); NFL Senior Vice President of Officiating Training & Development (2020–2024); NFL official (1996–2019); Coordinator of Football Officials, Big 12 (2006–2018)
- Spouse: Afshan
- Children: 5 (1 with current wife)

Walter John Anderson (born September 29, 1952) is a former American football official in the National Football League (NFL) from the 1996 NFL season to the 2019 NFL season. He wore uniform number 66. Anderson spent his first seven seasons in the NFL as a line judge before being promoted to referee for the start of the 2003 NFL season after Dick Hantak and Bob McElwee announced their retirements. He is notable for officiating Super Bowl XXXV. Anderson was also named as referee for Super Bowl XLV which was played on February 6, 2011, in Arlington, Texas, at Cowboys Stadium.

After retiring from officiating, he was the NFL senior vice president of officiating training & development from May 2020 to April 2024. He is currently the officiating & rules analyst for the NFL.

== Early life ==
Born in DeFuniak Springs, Florida, Anderson was raised in Channelview, Texas where his father was a high school football head coach. He played quarterback for his father at Channelview. Later, he played football for Sam Houston State University, where he was a two-time Academic All-American and lettered four years. He graduated from Sam Houston State in 1974.

== Family ==
He is married to Afshan and they have one child together (he and his wife each have two children from previous marriages). He currently resides in Sugar Land, Texas. His son Derek is also an official who joined the NFL for the 2024 season.

== Other professions ==
After completing his undergraduate studies at Sam Houston State University and receiving a doctorate of dentistry from the University of Texas Health Science Center at Houston (UTHealth) School of Dentistry, he became a dentist. He retired from dentistry in 2003 when he was promoted to referee in the NFL.

On April 26, 2006, Anderson was named Coordinator of Football Officials for the Big 12 Conference, succeeding former NFL field judge Tim Millis in this position.

== Officiating career ==
=== Early years ===
Wanting to stay active in football following college, Anderson decided to pursue a career in officiating. He began officiating junior high and little leagues, high school, then eventually college. In 11 years of college experience, he worked games in the Lone Star (Division II), Southland (Division I-FCS), and Southwest Conferences (Division I). At the college level, Anderson was scouted by ex-NFL officials who were looking to fill openings at the professional football level.

=== National Football League ===
Anderson joined the NFL in 1996 and, as of 2015, he has officiated in 17 playoff games, including eight Wild Card, two Divisional, five Conference Championship games, and two Super Bowls: Super Bowl XXXV in 2001 (as line judge) and Super Bowl XLV in 2011 (as referee). He was the referee in the January 18, 2015 AFC Championship game, known for the deflategate controversy. Anderson cites Super Bowl XXXV as being his most memorable game.

Anderson refereed the final NFL game in San Diego, a Kansas City Chiefs win over the Chargers.

Anderson's 2019 NFL officiating crew consisted of umpire Ruben Fowler, down judge Tom Stephan, line judge Byron Boston, field judge Lee Dyer, side judge Rick Patterson, back judge Keith Ferguson, replay official Brian Matoren, and replay assistant Saleem Choudhry.

Anderson's final NFL game as referee was a 2019 NFC Divisional Playoff game between the Minnesota Vikings and the San Francisco 49ers at Levi's Stadium in Santa Clara, California. After that game, he retired from officiating and was promoted to the NFL front office as a senior vice president in 2020. In April 2024, he transitioned to a new role as NFL rules analyst and club communications liaison.

On March 27, 2026, Anderson was named a defendant in a lawsuit by former referee Robin DeLorenzo over claims of gender-based discrimination from 2022 to 2025.
