= Milorad M. Drachkovitch =

Serbian American political scientist

Milorad M. Drachkovitch (8 November 1921 – 16 June 1996) was a Serbian American political scientist.

== Biography ==
Drachkovitch was born in Belgrade, Kingdom of Serbs, Croats and Slovenes (later Yugoslavia), as the posthumous son of Milorad Drašković, the country's Minister of the Interior, who had been assassinated. A liberal Serbian nationalist during World War II, Drachkovitch initially joined Chetnik resistance to the Nazi occupation, and later fled the country to escape Communist rule.

He resumed his studies at the University of Geneva, receiving a bachelor's degree in political science in 1949 followed by a PhD in 1953. From 1955 to 1956, he was a fellow of the Commonwealth Fund and traveled widely in relief missions. After serving as the director of studies at the College of Europe in Bruges, Belgium, Drachkovitch went to the United States in 1958, where he held a succession of academic posts. He was a visiting assistant professor of political science at the University of California, Berkeley, a fellow at the Russian Research Center at Harvard University and, from 1961 to 1993, a senior fellow at the Hoover Institution on War, Revolution and Peace at Stanford University. He served as the director of the Hoover Archives. He retired from the position in 1988 but and was awarded the title of senior fellow, emeritus, at the Hoover Institution in 1993.

Drachkovitch died on 16 June 1996 at the age of 75. He was survived by his son Rasha Drachkovitch.

== Works ==
- Les Socialismes français et allemands et le problème de la guerre 1870-1914 (Genève 1953)
- De Karl Marx à Léon Blum (Geneva 1954)
- United States Aid to Yugoslavia and Poland (D.C. 1963)
- Biographical Dictionary of the Comintern (Stanford 1973, 2nd Edition with Branko Lazitch).

== See also ==
- Michael Boro Petrovich
- Milivoy S. Stanoyevich
- Wayne S. Vucinich
