= Milivoy Stoyan Stanoyevich =

Serbian-American writer

Milivoy Stoyan Stanoyevich (14 February 1881 – 1960) was a Serbian-American university professor, essayist and author of several books.

== Biography ==
He was born Milivoy Stoyan Stanoyevich in a small village called Koprivnica in the Austro-Hungarian Empire on 14 February 1881, the second of four sons (Milan, Vidoje, and Miloš). After graduating from the gymnasium in Koprivnica, he enrolled at the University of Belgrade in 1898. Four years later (1901), he graduated and "was appointed professor ad interim of modern languages at Zaječar College. He might have lived happily as a college professor had he not written a pamphlet entitled "Youth and Socialism", which enraged the Serbian government at a time when communism was threatening the status quo of every Slavic country. After appearing in court he was given an option—jail or exile—for his political crime. After much deliberation with his father Stoyan, Milivoy left Serbia to study in Vienna and Geneva and then crossed the Atlantic to America, never to return."

He arrived in 1908 in New York City, where he found work and continued his post-graduate studies in literature at Columbia University and later at the University of California at Berkley, where he earned his Master of Arts and Master of Literature degrees in 1914. In 1915 he became a lecturer in Slavonic literature at his alma mater and in 1916 he was appointed political adviser on Slavic Affairs in the office of the Imperial Russian consul-general in San Francisco. After two years of graduate work and employment at the consulate, he received his Ph.D., and in 1917 married Beatrice Louise Stevenson, who grew up on Fifth Avenue in New York. "She was an educated woman with strong literary tastes who fell in love with Milivoy and the romance of the Serbs. Their marriage was happy, they collaborated together on several books, including a translation of Serbian poetry that sings the praises of Dubrovnik."

In the 1920s he published his thesis about Tolstoy, worked as an editor for The New York Times, and taught Slavonic languages at Columbia University. Stanoyevich edited several Yugoslav and Serbian publications, namely the Pittsburgh-based American Srbobran, and frequently contributed to American periodicals and magazines such as The Nation, The Century, The Encyclopedia Americana, Current History, Business & Economics, The Bookman, Geographical Review, Contemporary Review, and many other similar publications. His writings are marked by a fresh and vigorous style, refined simplicity, and incisive diction. His studies are full of delicate observation of human nature and he may be justly regarded as a representative writer of Serbian prose.

According to Matthew Stevenson, his grandson, Milivoy Stanoyevich was a casualty of the Great Depression. He kept reading and writing but left teaching to start a number of dubious business ventures, such as Universal Syndicate. He also challenged planning boards in New Jersey or tried to set himself up as a trust. In the late 1950s, he suffered a stroke and was in ill health until he died in New York City in 1960.

By the next generation, Milivoy Stanoyevich's son Nikolai dropped his father's surname and adopted his mother's.

== Works ==
- Omladina u Sadasnjosti (Serbian, 1907);
- Zabavnicima (Serbian, 1908);
- Vestina pisanja (Serbian, 1915);
- Pessimisme et Optimisme dans la Sociologie (in collaboration with his brother, Milosh S. Stanoyevich in French in 1913);
- Tolstoy's Theory of Social Reform;
- Russian Foreign Policy in the East;
- Early Jugoslav Literature, 1000–1800, published by Columbia University Press;
- The Yugoslavs in the United States of America;
- Tolstoy's Interpretation of Money and Property

== See also ==
- Milorad M. Drachkovitch
- Wayne S. Vucinich
- Michael Boro Petrovich
