= Chet Curtis =

American journalist

- Born: Chester Kukiewicz; April 15, 1939; Amsterdam, New York, U.S.
- Died: January 22, 2014 (aged 74); Boston, Massachusetts, U.S.
- Education: Ithaca College
- Occupations: News anchor, reporter
- Spouse(s): Helen Wagner (m. 1960–1974) Natalie Jacobson (1975–2000)
- Children: 3

Chet Curtis (born Chester Kukiewicz; April 15, 1939 – January 22, 2014) was an American newscaster who co-anchored with his then-wife, newscaster Natalie Jacobson. He was born in Amsterdam, New York and raised in Schenectady, New York.

Curtis was a primetime anchor at NECN, where he anchored The Chet Curtis Report, a nightly news and interview program, and co-anchored New England Business Day. Before joining NECN in the spring of 2001, Curtis had been an anchor and reporter with WCVB-TV since its launch in 1972. For the majority of his time at WCVB, Curtis, with Jacobson, co-anchored the station's principal weekday newscasts, and was the original host of the station's award-winning Chronicle program. He began his career in Boston at the former WHDH-TV Channel 5, before that station lost its license, and ownership was handed over to Boston Broadcasters, Inc., who re-launched Channel 5 as today's WCVB. Before coming to New England, Curtis worked as an anchor and reporter at CBS television's flagship station WCBS-TV in New York City, and prior to that at WTOP-TV (now WUSA-TV), the CBS affiliate in Washington, D.C., also as an anchor and reporter.

== Personal life/death ==
Curtis fathered three daughters, and lived in Quincy, Massachusetts. In late 2012, he was diagnosed with pancreatic cancer. On September 12, 2013, a frail Curtis was inducted into the Massachusetts Broadcasters Hall of Fame. He died on January 22, 2014, of pancreatic cancer, at age 74. He is buried in St. Stanislaus Cemetery, Amsterdam, NY.
