= Vukovich =

Vukovich is a surname. Notable people with the surname include:

- A. J. Vukovich (born 2001), American baseball player
- Bernice Carr Vukovich (born 1938), South African tennis player
- Bill Vukovich (1918–1955), American racing driver
- Bill Vukovich II (1944–2023), American racing driver
- Billy Vukovich III (1963–1990), American racing driver
- Frances Vukovich (born 1930), American baseball player
- George Vukovich (born 1956), American baseball player
- John Vukovich (1947–2007), American baseball player and coach
- Martin Vukovich (born 1944), Austrian diplomat
- Steve Vukovich (1890–1951), American politician
