= Danijela Popović =

Serbian-American musician, actress and writer

- Born: Belgrade, Serbia, Yugoslavia
- Occupations: Actress; Musician
- Website: danijela.online

Danijela Popović (Belgrade) is a Serbian-American Actor, composer, pianist, educator, and playwright. She pursued higher musical education at the Juilliard School in New York City and honed her acting skills at the Herbert Berghof Studio, also in New York.

Popović gained recognition for her role in the film "Yugodivas", directed by Andrea Staka, and as a cofounder of the group D'Divaz. As a concert performer specializing in modern and classical music, she has appeared in over 500 performances worldwide.

In addition to her extensive musical and theatrical career, Popović made a significant impact on New York theater audiences in the summer of 2024. She debuted as the writer, actress, and pianist of the critically acclaimed monodrama "When it hurts you play" directed by Aleksey Burago. The production premiered in Serbia at the Monodrama and Pantomime Festival in Zemun in November 2024.

== Biography ==
Danijela Popović was born in Belgrade, SFR Yugoslavia, where she completed primary and secondary school, alongside her musical training. She earned her degree in piano performance from the Faculty of Music at the University of Arts in Belgrade, studying under the renowned Prof. Dušan Trbojević. Following her graduation, she served as his assistant at the piano department. Additionally, she worked as an assistant professor in the Department for strings of the same faculty, contributing as a collaborative pianist.

During her master's studies in Yugoslavia, she was mentored by Prof. Arbo Valdma.

In 1990, she relocated to New York to continue her postgraduate studies at The Juilliard School, a prestigious performing arts conservatory.

=== Music activity ===
After graduating, Danijela Popović spent eight years with the Boys and Girls Choir of Harlem, serving as the principal pianist, piano professor, and head of the Piano Department.

She co-founded the female ensemble D'Divaz alongside Milica Paranosić and Aleksandra Vojčić. Within the group, she composed, performed, promoted, and marketed original music that received critical acclaim. D'Divaz released an album in 2000, contributed to Elliott Sharp's album State of Mind, and served as Storm King Artists in Residence. The ensemble also organized a benefit concert for the renovation of the Children's Hospital in Belgrade and starred in the film Yugodivas.

Popović has performed in over 500 concerts and recitals, appearing on prominent American television networks such as ABC, CBS, and Fox 5, as well as on Serbia’s Studio B and Radio Television Belgrade. Her performances have graced iconic venues including Lincoln Center, Carnegie Hall, the Kennedy Center, and Joe’s Pub at the Public Theater.

She also collaborates with Miloš Raičković, a Serbian-born composer and conductor known as the founder of New Classicism.

=== Acting ===
Danijela Popović studied acting at The Herbert Berghof (HB) Studio in New York, where she was also an ensemble member. Additionally, she is a member of the Necessary I.T.E.M.S. Project, a New York-based theater ensemble.

Her stage credits include roles in Benefit (directed by Eli Ellsworth), The Circus of Life (directed by Lynn Barr), Lady with a Lapdog with Jokes and a Happy Ending (directed by Aleksey Burago), The Dome (produced by Prospect Theatre), Almost a Fantasy (Fringe NYC 2012, directed by John Grabowski), The Red Wednesday (Ice Factory 2013, directed by Sanaj Gajar), Mother of God (directed by Vincent Gaeta), Medea (American Thyme Theatre), Waiting for Godot (directed by Vincent Gaeta), The Requiem (Necessary I.T.E.M.S.), and Crime and Punishment (directed by Aleksey Burago).

Popović received critical acclaim for her performance in Flight Number Love, and The last Station, produced by Necessary I.T.E.M.S. Project, directed by Irina Abraham. Her portrayal earned her a nomination for the Outstanding Lead Actress Award at The Planet Connections Theatre Festival.

=== Monodrama "When it hurts you play" ===
In June 2024, Popović introduced herself to the New York theater audience as the complete author – the writer, actress, and pianist – of the critically acclaimed monodrama "When it hurts you play" directed by Alexey Burago.

The monodrama had its Serbian premiere at the Monodrama and Pantomime Festival in Zemun in November 2024.
