= Rade Paravina =

Serbian-American doctor and scientist

Rade D. Paravina
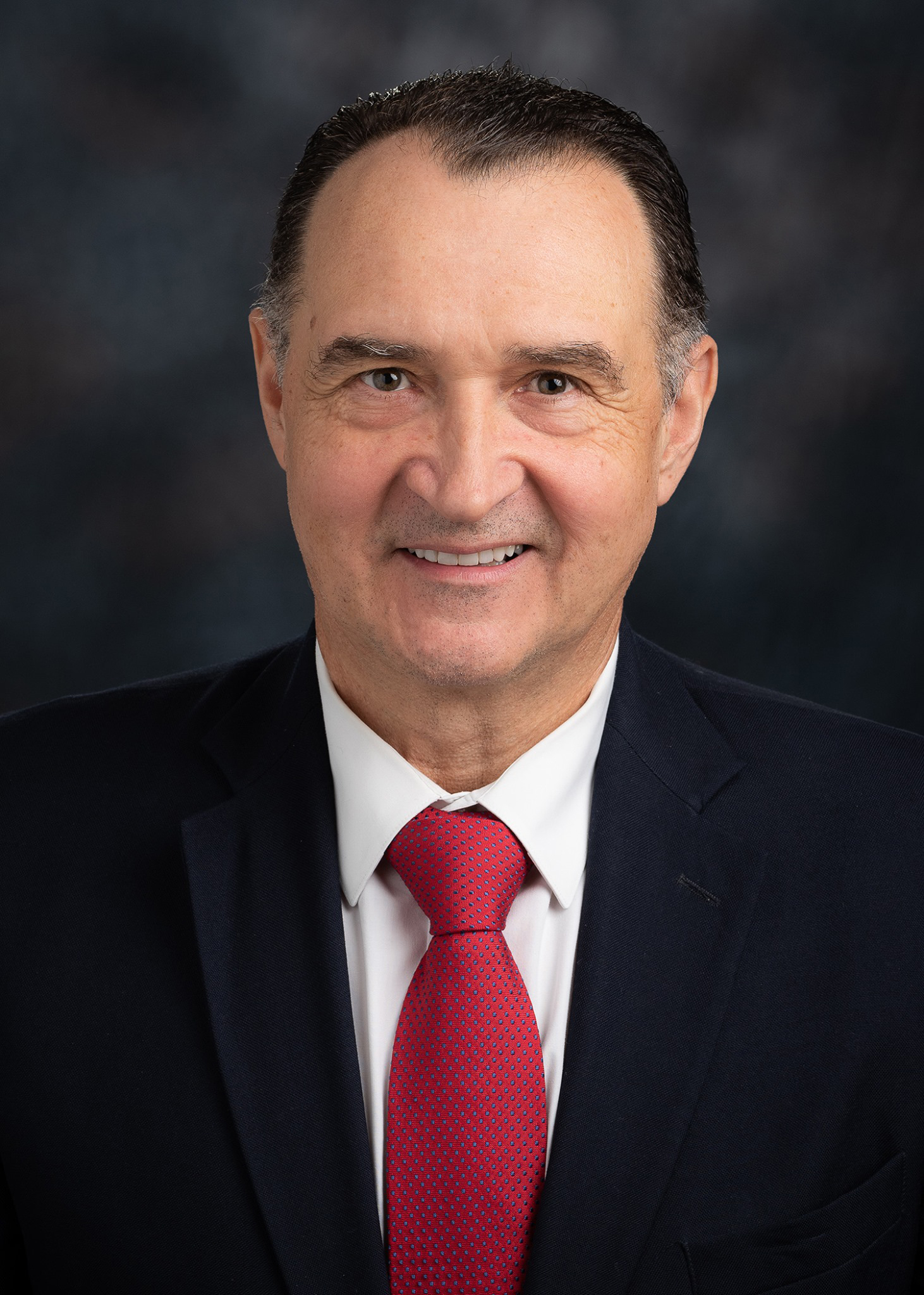
- Born: May 14, 1962 (age 64); Belgrade, FPR Yugoslavia (today Serbia)
- Education: University of Niš School of Medicine, integrated academic studies – Dentistry
- Known for: Color and appearance research in esthetic dentistry
- Medical career
- Profession: Professor
- Institutions: School of Dentistry, University of Texas Health Science Center at Houston

Rade D. Paravina (Serbian Cyrillic: Раде Д. Паравина, Serbian pronunciation: [râːde paravina]; born May 14, 1962) is a Serbian-American professor at School of Dentistry (UTSD), University of Texas Health Science Center at Houston (UTHealth). He serves as the director of the Houston Center for Biomaterials & Biomimetics and holds the Ralph C. Cooley DDS, Distinguished Professorship in Biomaterials.

== Career ==
Paravina graduated from the University of Niš School of Medicine, where he subsequently completed a three-year residency in prosthodontics and earned his master's and doctoral degree, and joined the UTSD in 2000. He designed and developed several dental products and tests and together with VITA Zahnfabrik designed two shade guides, Linearguide 3D Master and Bleachedguide 3D Master. He has developed Dental Color Matcher, an online evaluating training program for esthetic dentistry, and the scientific protocol for evaluating the "chameleon effect" of dental materials.

He serves as Editor-in-Chief of the Journal of Esthetic and Restorative Dentistry and editorial board member of the Journal of Dentistry, Journal of Prosthetic Dentistry, International Journal of Prosthodontics, and the American Journal of Dentistry.

He is the founder and past president of the Society for Color and Appearance in Dentistry (SCAD), director in the Executive Council of the American Academy of Esthetic Dentistry (AAED), and fellow of SCAD, AAED, and the American Association for Dental Research (AADR).

He is included in the Encyclopedia of the National Diaspora, edited by chronicler Ivan Kalauzović Ivanus.

== Selected publications ==
- Paravina, R. and Powers, J. Esthetic Color Training in Dentistry (2004)
- Chu, S., Devigus, A., Paravina, R., and Mieleszko, A. Fundamentals of Color: Shade Matching and Communication in Esthetic Dentistry (2004) – co-editor
- Chu, S., Sailer, I., Paravina, R., and Mieleszko, A. Color in Dentistry – A Clinical Guide to Predictable Esthetics (2017) – co-editor
- Paravina, R. Understanding Color (chapter in Ronald E. Goldstein's "Esthetics in Dentistry", pp. 270–294) (2018)

== Literature ==
- Kalauzović, I., ed. (2024). Encyclopedia of the National Diaspora. Niš, Serbia: Impressions Publishing. ISBN 978-86-82470-02-1.
