= Wayne S. Vucinich =

American historian

- Born: Voislav Vucinich; June 23, 1913; Butte, Montana, U.S.
- Died: April 21, 2005 (aged 91); Menlo Park, California, U.S.
- Education: University of California, Berkeley
- Occupations: Historian; Educator; Academic
- Spouse: Sarafina "Sara" Stys (m. 1942; died 1990)

Wayne Spiro Vucinich (born Voislav Vucinich; June 23, 1913 – April 21, 2005) was an American historian. Following World War II, he was one of the founders of Russian, Slavic, East European and Byzantine studies at Stanford University, where he spent his entire academic career.

== Life ==
Vucinich was born in the United States to Spiro J. Vucinich and Sofija (Palikucha) Vucinich, a family of Serb immigrants who had come from Bosnia in the early twentieth century. He was born in Butte, Montana in 1913, and lived there until he was orphaned at 5 years old and then sent back to Herzegovina.

He was educated in Herzegovina and Los Angeles, California. He attended the University of California, Berkeley, earning a M.A. in East European history in 1936. He continued doctoral studies until 1941, and also studied at the Charles University in Prague.

=== Career ===
Vucinich began working for Office of Strategic Services (OSS) and worked as an analyst for the Balkans and the Soviet Union during the Second World War. He was offered a teaching position in Stanford's History Department after the war; he taught there from 1946 to his 1978 retirement. In 1977, the Robert and Florence McDonnell Professor of Eastern European Studies chair was established for him. Among his students were David Kennedy and Norman Naimark.

From 1981 to 1982, he served as president of the American Association for the Advancement of Slavic Studies.

== Legacy and honors ==
- In 1954, Vucinich won the George Louis Beer Prize of the American Historical Association for his Serbia Between East and West: The Events of 1903-08.
- 1982, the Vucinich Book Prize was established in his honor by the American Association for the Advancement of Slavic Studies. Given annual, the Wayne S. Vucinich Book Prize is awarded to "the most important contribution to Russian, Eurasian, and East European studies in any discipline of the humanities or social sciences published English in the United States in the previous calendar year".
- In 1989, Vucinich and Jozo Tomasevich received the Distinguished Contributions to Slavic Studies Award from the Association for Slavic, East European, and Eurasian Studies.

== Selected works ==
- Serbian foreign policy 1903-1909. Thesis (M.A.), University of California, Berkeley 1936.
- Serbian foreign policy, 1903-1908. Thesis (Ph.D.) University of California, Berkeley 1941.
- The Second World War and beyond. 1949.
- Yugoslavs of the Moslem faith. 1949.
- "Postwar Yugoslav Historiography," The Journal of Modern History Vol. 23, No. 1, March 1951
- Serbia between East and West; the events of 1903-1908. Stanford University Press, Stanford 1954.
- "The Yugoslav Lands in the Ottoman Period: Postwar Marxist Interpretations of Indigenous and Ottoman Institutions," The Journal of Modern History Vol. 27, No. 3, September 1955
- Yugoslavs in California. Los Angeles 1960.
- The Ottoman Empire, its record and legacy. Van Nostrand, Princeton, N.J. 1965.
- The peasant in nineteenth-century Russia: a conference on the Russian peasant in the nineteenth century. Stanford 1966.
- Contemporary Yugoslavia; twenty years of Socialist experiment. (With Jozo Tomasevich; Stanford University.; et al.) University of California Press, Berkeley 1969.
- Russia and Asia; essays on the influence of Russia on the Asian peoples. Hoover Institution Press, Stanford University, Stanford, Calif. ©1972.
- Eastern Europe. Ginn, Lexington, Mass. 1973.
- Croatian illyrism; its background and genesis. 1975.
- A study in social survival: the katun in Bileća Rudine. University of Denver, Graduate School of International Studies, Denver ©1975.
- Nation and ideology: essays in honour of Wayne S. Vucinich. (With Ivo Banac.) East European monographs, Boulder; Columbia U.P. (distr.) New York, 1981.
- The First Serbian uprising, 1804-1813. Social Science Monographs; New York. Distributed by Columbia University Press, Boulder 1982.
- At the brink of war and peace: the Tito-Stalin split in a historic perspective. Social Science Monographs, Brooklyn College Press, New York. Distributed by Columbia University Press, 1982.
- Kosovo: legacy of a medieval battle. (With Thomas Allan Emmert.) University of Minnesota, Minneapolis, Minn. 1991.
- Ivo Andric revisited: the bridge still stands. International and Area Studies, Berkeley, ©1995.
- Memoirs of my childhood in Yugoslavia. (With Larry Wolff.) Society for the Promotion of Science and Scholarship, Palo Alto, Calif. ©2007.

== See also ==
- Milivoy S. Stanoyevich
- Michael Boro Petrovich
- Milorad M. Drachkovitch
