= Judith Schiff =

American archivist (1937–2022)

Judith Schiff (November 26, 1937 – July 11, 2022) was an American archivist. She was chief research archivist at Yale University and historian for the city of New Haven, Connecticut.

== Early life ==
Schiff was born in New York City, but grew up in New Haven, where she attended Hillhouse High School. She earned a degree in history from Barnard College, and returned to work at the Cowles Foundation at Yale.

== Career as a librarian ==
Schiff's first job at the Yale University Library was to catalog the papers of William Dwight Whitney and Josiah Dwight Whitney. She worked at the university for more than 60 years, becoming Yale University Library chief research archivist in 1971. She met Millicent Todd Bingham and helped to acquire the papers of Bingham's mother, Mabel Loomis Todd, an editor of Emily Dickinson's poetry. In the 1960s, Schiff got to know Charles Lindbergh and his wife, Anne Morrow Lindbergh, who visited the library to look at Lindbergh's manuscripts. She went on to co-edit Lindbergh's Autobiography of Values, and co-wrote a biography of the aviator. Schiff also helped determine that a skeleton exposed by a tree uprooted by Hurricane Sandy in 2012 dated to the 18th century.

In addition, Schiff organized exhibitions. She served on the group investigating Yale's slavery history.

Schiff was inspired by a "history from below," and her work often focused on telling the history of marginalized people, including women and people of color.

Beyond Yale, Schiff was a founder of New England Archivists, the Jewish Historical Society of Greater New Haven, and the Ethnic Heritage Center of New Haven.

While working at Yale, she earned a master's degree in history from Columbia University and a degree in library science from Southern Connecticut State College.

== Recognition ==
Schiff won the Edward Bouchet Legacy Award for her research, the Linda Lorimarr Award for Distinguished Service, and the Yale Medal from the Yale Alumni Association.
