= Aleksey Burago =

Russian-American theater director

- Алексей Бураго
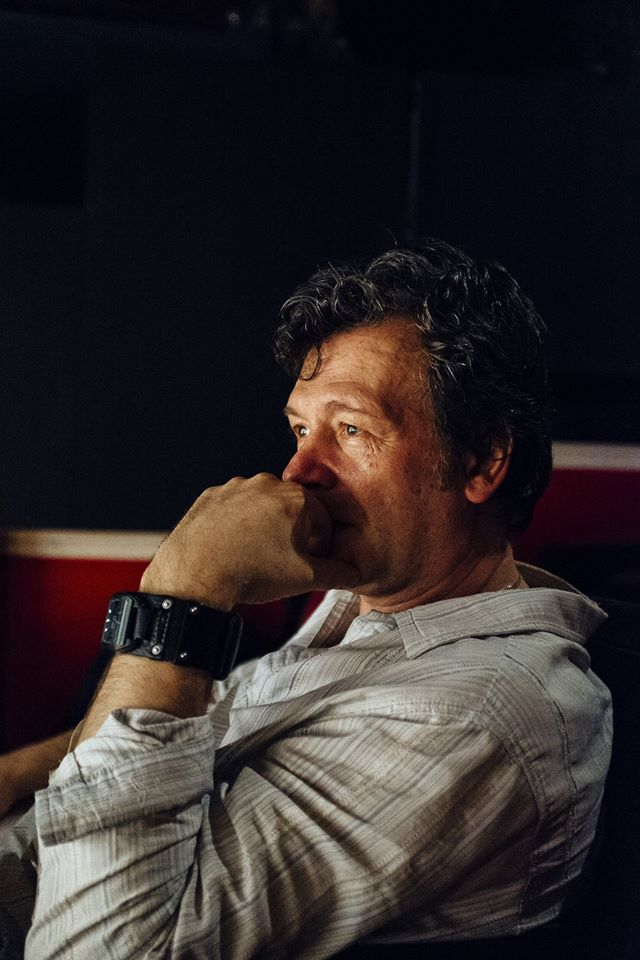
- Russian Director Aleksey Burago, Artistic Director of The Russian Arts Theater & Studio
- Born: Saint Petersburg, Russian SFSR, Soviet Union
- Education: Russian Academy of Theatre Arts
- Occupation: theater director

Aleksey Burago (Russian: Алексей Бураго) is a Russian-American theater director, founder and artistic director of The Russian Arts Theater and Studio (TRATS) in New York City.

== Life and career ==
Aleksey Burago (director) is the artistic and founding director of The Russian Arts Theater and Studio, a not-for-profit theater company located on the Upper West Side in Manhattan, New York City. Aleksey graduated from Moscow Academy of Theatre Arts (GITIS) and studied with world famous theater director Pyotr Fomenko. His Moscow directing credits include: "Beyond Recognition." Off-Broadway, he has directed "Gamblers," "An Absolutely Happy Village", "Ah! My Dear Andersen" and "On the Eve." At HB Playwrights Foundation, he has directed "Vassa," "Picnic on the Battlefield," "The Master and Margarita," "Wonder Bread" and "Lady with the Lapdog with Jokes and a Happy Ending." His TV credits include "The Queen of Spades" (Actor/Director). His awards include 1992 Best Director - St. Petersburg Comedy Festival and 1993 Best Director - Moscow Annual Festival of Classical Plays. He has been on faculty at Theatre Academy and Conservatory in St. Petersburg, Danish Theatre School GITIS and Manhattanville College, where he taught acting and staged the short stories of Anton Chekhov.

Since his arrival to New York in 1997, Burago has directed many shows in New York and New Jersey, to rave reviews. "Ah, My Dear Andersen," which he adapted and directed in 2001 at Urban Stages, was chosen as a critic's pick by Time Out New York The play "Wonder Bread" written and performed by Danusia Trevino while directed by Aleksey Burago won a prestigious United Solo Festival Award in 2011 for Best One-Woman Show.

Aleksey Burago is teaching Michael Chekhov Technique (acting and directing) at HB Studio in New York. He was the teacher of Natalya Rudakova, the leading star of Transporter 3 movie.

== Themes and style ==
Aleksey Burago is primarily recognized for dynamic, provocative and comedic staging of plays by Russian writers. He is a keen follower and a teacher of Stanislavsky and Michael Chekhov technique, and believes that the actor should be in a constant state of "play". He stresses the necessity of creating a gap between the actor and the character, and is a strong opponent of the use of affective memory on stage. His directing style is based on Stanislavsky's principle of "layering" actions: psychological, physical, and verbal. His work is often regarded as physical theater with mesmerizing atmospheres, although he has dismissed the claim in an interview, "It's not physical theater. It's our theater. We create theater we want to see." His signature staging of the short stories by Anton Chekhov created a sensation in the New York theater scene. He tends to create visually compelling, colorful performances, usually presented at unique spaces not typically used for theater performances. Burago's sold-out run of "Uncle Vanya" was staged on the second floor of the historic Stanton Street Shul. His most recent production of "Avenue of Wonder" re-inaugurated the Balcony Theater at West Park Presbyterian Church, which was the original home to the Riverside Shakespeare Company and one of Joe Papp's earliest venues.

== Awards ==
- Best One Woman Show, United Solo Theatre Festival in NYC (‘11)
- Best Director, Moscow Annual Festival of the Classical Plays (‘94)
- Best Director, St. Petersburg Comedy Festival (‘93)

== New York stages ==
=== 2010–present ===
- Enemies Of The People ('18) Pushkin Hall
- Lady With a Lapdog With Jokes And a Happy Ending ('18) Theater For a New City & Pushkin Hall
- Master and Margarita or Devil comes to Moscow ('17), West End Theater
- Dr. Chekhov's Swan Song (+ Other Prescriptions) ('17), Balcony Theater
- Swan Song ('17), Balcony Theater
- Three Sisters ('17), Balcony Theater
- Avenue of Wonder ('16), Balcony Theater
- My Uncle Chekhov ('15), West End Theater
- The Bear & Other Jokes by Anton Chekhov ('14), West End Theater
- Uncle Vanya ('13), The Stanton Street Shul
- Dr. Chekhov's Swan Song (+ Other Prescriptions) ('13), The Stanton Street Shul
- House of Curiosities (‘12) Connelly Theater
- The King is Dead! Long Live the King! (‘12) Connelly Theater
- The Seagull (‘11) HB Studio Workshop Theater
- Wonder Bread (‘11) United Solo Theater Fest, 59E59 & Edinburgh Fringe Festival
- Wonder Bread (‘10) Trevino, Theater For A New City

=== 2000 ===
- Lady w/the Lapdog; Happy Ending (‘09) Chekhov, HB Ensemble
- Wonder Bread (‘09) Trevino, HB Playwrights Foundation
- The Master and the Margarita (‘08) Bulgakov, HB Ensemble
- The Magic Forest of Baba Yaga (‘08) Wood (translation.), Urban Stages
- To Walk In Darkness ('09), James via Zuckerman, Turtle Shell Theatre
- Two by Tennessee: Auto da Fé... ('08), Williams, HB Studio Workshop
- Vassa (‘07) Gorky, HB Studio Workshop
- Ah, My Dear Andersen (‘06) Andersen via Burago, Urban Stages
- Two Evenings of One-Act Plays (‘06) HB Playwrights Foundation
- The French Defense (‘06) Raitzin, NYC Fringe Festival
- Little Jokes and Happy Endings (‘06) Chekhov, Manhattanville College
- Check Mate (‘06) Ratzin, HB Studio Workshop
- An Absolutely Happy Village (‘01) Vakhtin via Pezzulli/Burago, 42nd Street Workshop
- Ah, My Dear Andersen (‘01) Andersen via Burago, 42nd Street Workshop
- Hans Christian Andersen ('00), Andersen, Urban Stages

=== 1990s ===
- The Gamblers (‘99) Gogol, 42nd Street Workshop
- In Paris (‘99) Bunin, 42nd Street Workshop
- 11 by Checkhov (‘98) Checkhov, 42nd Street Workshop
- On The Eve (‘98) Turgenev, 42nd Street Workshop
- The Queen of Spades (‘98) Pushkin, 42nd Street Workshop
- Who Killed Louisa May Alcott? (‘97) Heard & White, 42nd Street Workshop
- Anton Series (‘97) Hauser & Chekhov, 42nd Street Workshop
- Sit Down, Eat Some Grass (‘97) Meehan, 42nd Street Workshop
- Cecil & Eddy ('97) Meehan, 42nd Street Workshop
- American Theater ('97) Lopez, 42nd Street Workshop

== Turkey Stages ==
- Lady with a Lapdog with Jokes and a Happy Ending ('15), Bilkent University (Ankara, Turkey)
- Billy Bob Boils the Sea (‘12) 9th International Ordu Youth and Children's Festival (Ordu, Turkey)

== Saint Petersburg and Moscow stages (1988–1996) ==
- Two Maples ('96), Schwartz, Regional Drama Theater
- Danaya ('95) Volkov, Baltic House Theater
- Camille ('94) Duma-Shepenko, Baltic Repertory Theater
- Beyond Recognition ('93) MacKenzie/du Pont Hermitage Imperial Theatre
- Stoned ('91) Rekshan, Youth Theater
- Fando & Lis ('90) Arrabal, Interatelier Theater
- The Emperor's New Clothes ('88), Shvarts, Youth Theater

== Film and television (1988–1996) ==
- The Islands of Love (‘96) Lenfilm
- The Queen of Spades (‘88) Pushkin, Moscow TV
