= Natalie Jacobson =

American television anchor

- Born: Natalie Salatich; August 14, 1943 (age 82)
- Education: University of New Hampshire
- Spouse(s): William D. Jacobson (m. 1965–1973) Chet Curtis (1975–2001)
- Children: Lindsay Curtis (b. 1981)

Natalie Jacobson (born August 14, 1943) is an American former news anchor with WCVB-TV in Boston.

== Early life ==
Jacobson is the daughter of William G. and Dawn (née Trbovich) Salatich. She is of Serbian descent. In 1965 she graduated from the University of New Hampshire in Durham, New Hampshire with a degree in English. Also in 1965 she and Army officer William D. Jacobson were married. During her husband's military career, she held a civilian job in Thailand. The Jacobsons divorced in 1973.

== Career ==
William D. Jacobson's military career ended in 1969 and the couple moved to Boston. She wanted to go into journalism but was unable to find work in the field. She eventually got an interview with independent station WKBG in Cambridge, Massachusetts (now WLVI-TV), but was not hired. However, she was later chosen to be the station's public affairs director. She moved to WBZ-TV in Boston as an off-camera producer after WKBG eliminated its public affairs division.

On March 19, 1972, Jacobson joined newly-formed WCVB-TV in Boston as a reporter. There she met news anchor Chet Curtis and they married in May 1975. In 1976 she became the first female anchor of a Boston evening newscast when she began co-anchoring WCVB's 6 p.m. newscasts. In 1978 she began anchoring the 11 p.m. newscasts with Tom Ellis. In 1982 she and Curtis began co-anchoring the station's 6 and 11 p.m. newscasts and the pairing lasted 17 years.

During her tenure at WCVB, Jacobson covered the Boston Pops Orchestra's annual Fourth of July concert, Elizabeth II, Nelson Mandela, and Pope John Paul II's visits to Boston, the Blizzard of '78, the presidential campaigns of Massachusetts' Michael Dukakis and John Kerry, the September 11 attacks, and the Boston Red Sox 2004 World Series victory. Her 1990 interview with Democratic gubernatorial nominee John Silber became notable after Silber's outburst when Jacobson asked him to describe his weaknesses. Silber's lead in the polls vanished after the interview and he lost the race to William Weld. On December 14, 1999, Jacobson and Curtis announced that they were divorcing. WCVB split up the Curtis/Jacobson pairing in July 2000.

Curtis was moved to Sundays 11 p.m. newscast and street reporting and soon left WCVB for NECN, a network. Jacobson scaled back her work. She anchored the 6 p.m. newscasts solo until March 2007, when she was joined by Ed Harding. Curtis and Jacobson's divorce was finalized in 2001. On July 10, 2007, Jacobson announced that she would depart WCVB-TV and her last newscast was on July 18, 2007.
