= Nada Martinović =

Serbian and American educator, conductor and researcher

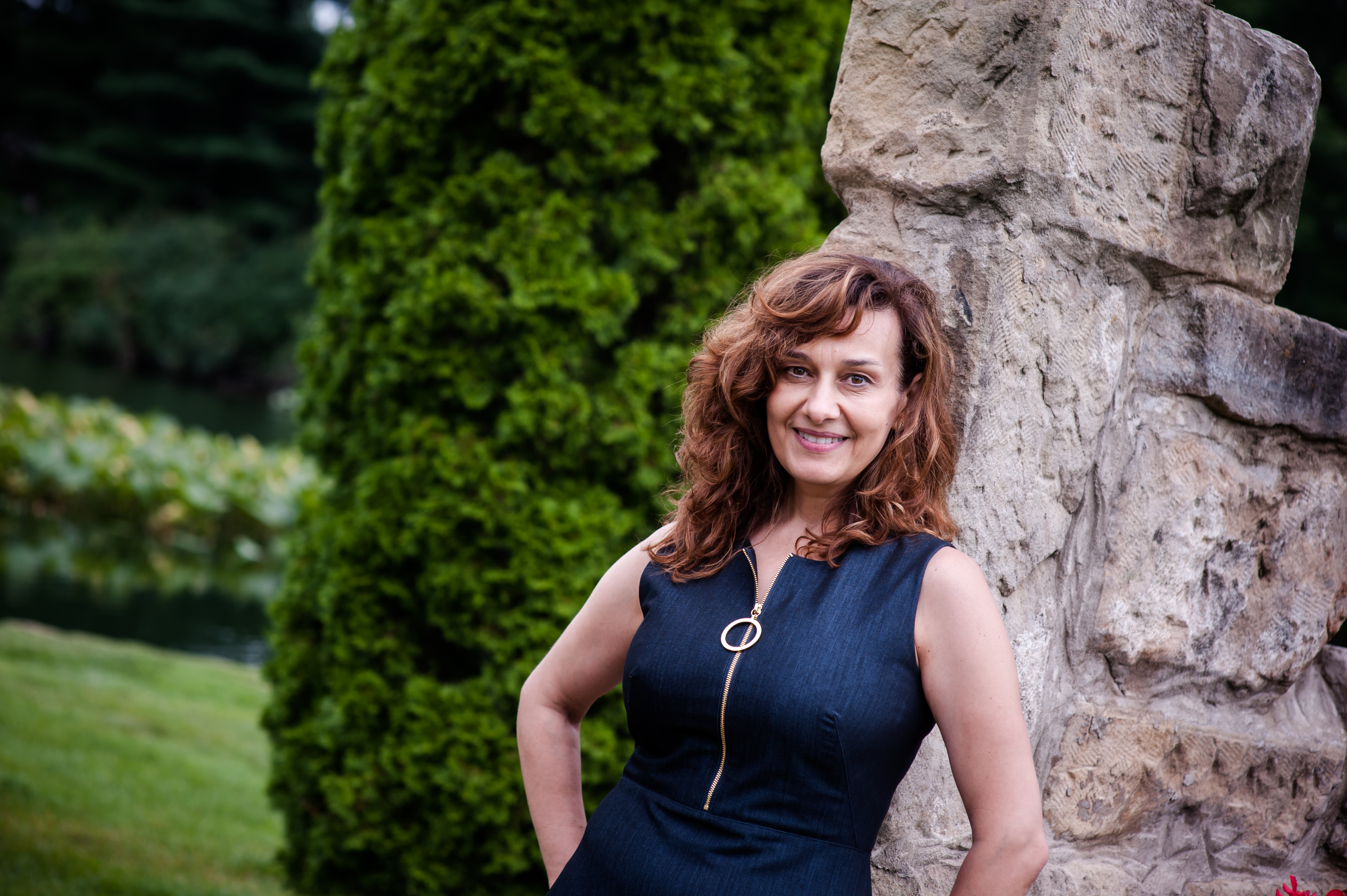
- Born: Нада Нартиновић; August 11, 1967 (age 59); Šabac, SR Serbia, SFR Yugoslavia
- Other name: Nada Martinovic-Trejgut
- Education: Kent State University, School of Music
- Children: Luka Trejgut, Viktor Trejgut
- Scientific career
- Fields: Musical cognition, child development
- Workplaces: Kent State University
- Thesis: The Effect of Movement Instruction on Memorization and Retention of New-song Material Among First-grade Students (2010)

Nada Martinović (Serbian Cyrillic: Нада Мартиновић, Serbian pronunciation: [nada martǐːnoʋit͡ɕ]; born August 11, 1967) is a Serbian-American music educator, conductor, and researcher based in Cleveland, Ohio.

== Early life and education ==
Martinović completed her primary and secondary education at Muzička Škola Mihailo Vukdragović in Šabac. She then attended the Faculty of Music Arts at the University of Arts in Belgrade, where she majored in Music Pedagogy.

== Career ==
After graduating, she taught piano and solfeggio in Šabac. During the Yugoslav Wars in the 1990s, Martinović co-founded a private music school in the city with four colleagues.

After immigrating to the United States in 1997, Martinović received a master's degree in Music Education from Cleveland State University in 2001. She earned her PhD at Kent State University, researching the connection between movement, memory, and musical cognition. She also contributed research to the National Children's Study, analyzing the impact of environmental factors on the health of young children.

From 2016 to 2018, Martinović was the publisher and chief operating officer of the Women's Journals (Summit, Stark, and Portage counties). From 2019 to 2020, she worked as a partnership specialist for the United States Department of Commerce. Since 2010, she served as an adjunct professor of music at Kent State University and director of the Cleveland Serbian Film Festival. In 2014, she founded the non-profit Serbian Heritage Project.

Since 2013, Martinović has represented the Serbian community at the Cleveland Museum of Art. She is a founding board member and the Serbian representative in the Eastern European Congress of Ohio, a board member of the International Community Council – Worldwide Intercultural Network (ICC-WIN), and the Ohio representative of the Tesla Science Foundation.

Martinović teaches both music and the Serbian language. Since 2018, she has been the conductor of the Serbian Men's Choir in Cleveland. In 2019, she became the coordinator and artistic director of the Serbian Cultural Garden during the One World Day festival.

=== St. Sava Children's Choir ===
In 2002, Martinović established the St. Sava Children's Choir in Cleveland, composed of members from local Serbian churches. The choir, consisting largely of American-born children, performs while also serving as a means of learning the Serbian language.

In 2020, in honor of the 164th anniversary of the birth of Nikola Tesla and as part of the Children of Serbia project, the St. Sava Children's Choir collaborated with Leontina Vukomanović's Choir Čarolija, folklore group Morava from Cleveland, and the Serbian school Nikola Tesla from Niagara Falls to record the song and video "The Circuit".

== Bibliography ==
- Parents' and Teachers' Perceptions of the Musical Development of Preschool Children Ages Two Through Four, scientific study (Cleveland State University, Cleveland, OH, 2001)
- The Effect of Movement Instruction on Memorization and Retention of New-Song Material Among First-Grade Students, scientific study (Kent State University, Kent, OH, 2010)
