= Dejan Sobajic =

Electrical engineer

Dejan Sobajic is an electrical engineer from Grid Consulting, LLC in San Jose, California. He was named a Fellow of the Institute of Electrical and Electronics Engineers (IEEE) in 2014 for his contributions to applications of neural networks in power engineering.
