= Mike Pusich =

Mayor of Douglas, Alaska
- In office 1947 - 1953

Personal details
- Born: June 27, 1896 Sombor, Vojvodina, Austro-Hungarian Empire (present day Serbia)
- Died: 1953 (age 57) Douglas, Territory of Alaska
- Spouse: Anna Bartolini
- Children: Helen Pusich, Rudy Pusich, Grace Pusich, Mike Pusich, Jr., Larry Pusich, Annie Pusich, Louie Pusich,
- Occupation: Restaurant and nightclub owner

Mike Pusich (1896-1953) was a Serbian American immigrant who was Mayor of Douglas, Alaska. Pusich immigrated to the United States in 1909 and settled in Douglas in 1912, where he remained until his death. He opened the Douglas Saloon in 1914, and became fire chief in 1936. As mayor, Pusich traveled to Washington D.C. at his own expense to secure the funds to relocate the U.S. Department of Interior Bureau of Mines office and laboratory to Douglas Island, and succeeded.

In 2017, the Douglas Harbor was renamed 'Mike Pusich Douglas Harbor' to recognize the decades of contributions made by Pusich.

== Notes ==
1. In the Juneau city ordinance referenced in the article, Sombor is incorrectly spelled as "Kumbar" due to its Cyrillic form, Сомбор, a common mistake made by people who do not use Cyrillic.
