= Sasha Stefanovic =

Serbian-American basketball player

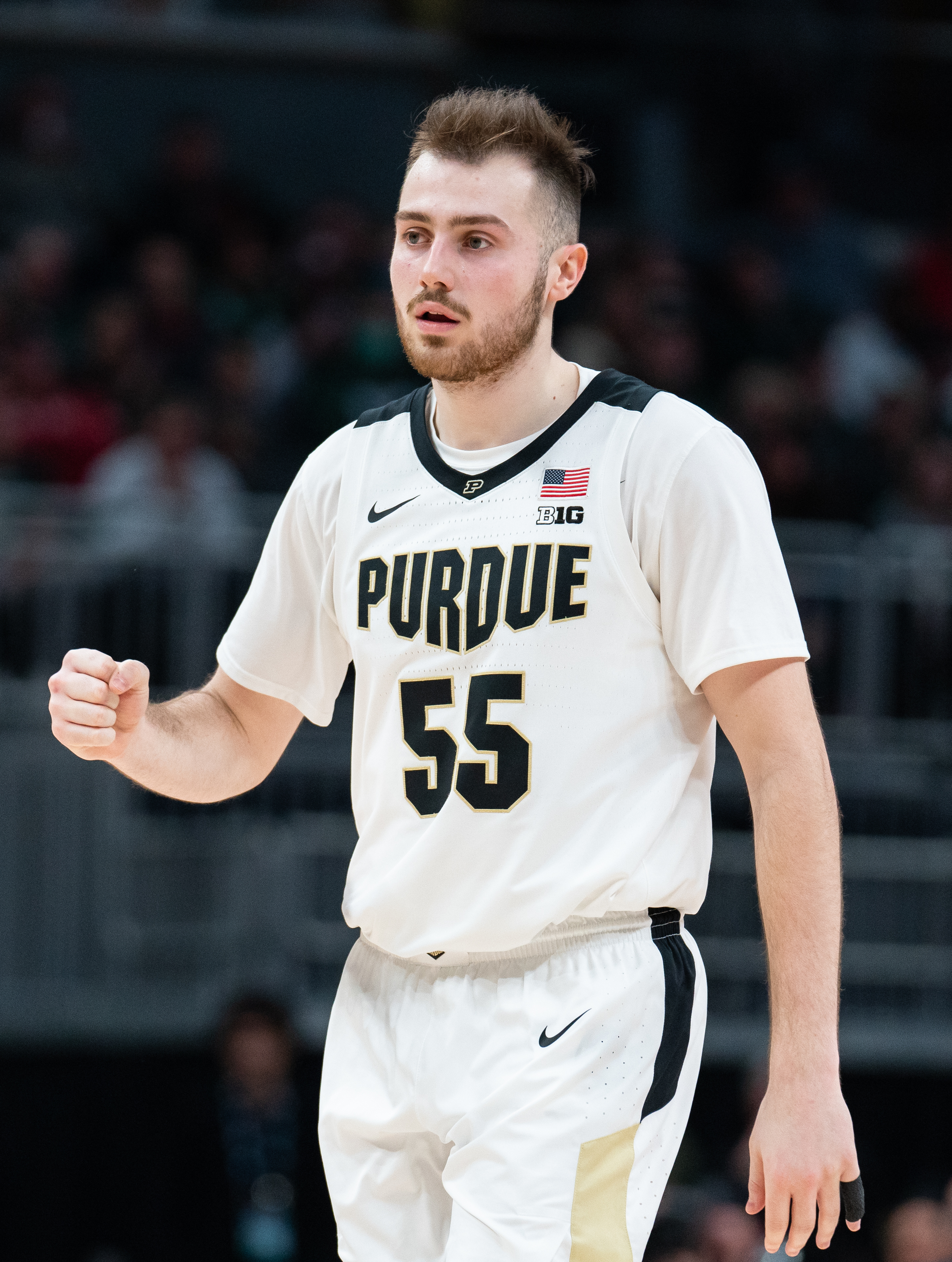
- Stefanovic with Purdue in 2022

Purdue Boilermakers
- Title: Assistant coach
- Conference: Big Ten Conference

Personal information
- Born: November 29, 1998 (age 27) Crown Point, Indiana, U.S.
- Listed height: 6 ft 5 in (1.96 m)
- Listed weight: 205 lb (93 kg)

Career information
- High school: Crown Point (Crown Point, Indiana)
- College: Purdue (2017–2022)
- NBA draft: 2022: undrafted
- Playing career: 2022–2023
- Position: Shooting guard
- Number: 55

Career history
- 2022: Kolossos Rodou
- 2022–2023: Mega Basket
Medals
Men's basketball
Representing the United States
Summer Universiade
Silver medal – second place	2017 Taipei	Team

Aleksandar "Sasha" Stefanovic (Serbian Cyrillic: Александар "Саша" Стефановић; born November 29, 1998) is a Serbian-American former professional basketball player. He played college basketball for the Purdue Boilermakers. He is now an assistant coach for Purdue.

== High school career ==
Stefanovic attended Crown Point High School and played alongside future Indiana player Grant Gelon. Stefanovic averaged 15.4 points, 7 rebounds, and 3.7 assists per game as a junior, earning First Team All-Region honors. In the 2016 Class 4A Crown Point Sectional championship game against Valparaiso High School, he hit a three-pointer at the end of regulation in a 59–54 double-overtime victory and recorded 18 points. As a senior, Stefanovic averaged 20 points, 7 rebounds and 2.1 assists per game on a team that finished with a 22–4 record and won the Duneland Athletic Conference title. He was named The Times of Northwest Indiana Player of the Year. Stefanovic finished as the school's all-time leading scorer with 1,385 points. A three-star recruit, he received scholarship offers from Loyola–Chicago, Northern Iowa, Valparaiso, Evansville, DePaul and Xavier and also was recruited by Purdue, though Matt Painter admitted the team did not have a scholarship and suggested he attend prep school. In February 2017, a scholarship became available after Basil Smotherman's departure, and Stefanovic committed to playing college basketball for Purdue.

== College career ==
Stefanovic redshirted his true freshman season at Purdue. He played sparingly as a redshirt freshman, averaging 2.5 points and 1.1 rebounds per game. He missed the opening game of his sophomore season against Green Bay due to a foot injury. Stefanovic averaged 9.1 points, 2.4 rebounds and 1.7 assists per game as a sophomore. He tested positive for COVID-19 in January 2021, forcing him to miss three games. As a junior, Stefanovic averaged 9.3 points, 2.6 rebounds and 2.6 assists per game. He was named Honorable Mention All-Big Ten as a senior.

== Professional career ==
After going undrafted in the 2022 NBA draft, Stefanovic joined the San Antonio Spurs for the 2022 NBA Summer League.

On August 19, 2022, Stefanovic signed his first professional contract overseas with Greek club Kolossos Rodou.

On November 17, 2022, he signed with Mega Basket of the ABA League.

On March 26, 2023, Stefanovic announced his retirement from professional basketball on his personal Instagram account.

== National team career ==
Stefanovic was a part of the Purdue team chosen to represent the United States in the 2017 Summer Universiade in Taipai, Taiwan. The U.S. received a silver medal after losing in the title game to Lithuania, though Stefanovic sat out the game.

In April 2022, Stefanovic expressed his interest to represent Serbia internationally in the senior competitions, if called.

== Career statistics ==
Legend
GP	Games played	GS	Games started	MPG	Minutes per game
FG%	Field goal percentage	3P%	3-point field goal percentage	FT%	Free throw percentage
RPG	Rebounds per game	APG	Assists per game	SPG	Steals per game
BPG	Blocks per game	PPG	Points per game	**Bold**	Career high

=== College ===
Year	Team	GP	GS	MPG	FG%	3P%	FT%	RPG	APG	SPG	BPG	PPG
2017–18	Purdue	Redshirt										
2018–19	Purdue	36	0	11.6	.390	**.410**	.357	1.1	.4	.6	.1	2.5
2019–20	Purdue	30	22	26.4	.385	.383	.816	2.4	1.7	**1.0**	**.3**	9.1
2020–21	Purdue	25	21	29.4	**.416**	.400	.842	**2.6**	2.6	.7	.2	9.3
2021–22	Purdue	**37**	**37**	**30.4**	.392	.380	**.867**	2.5	**3.0**	.4	.2	**10.4**
Career		128	80	24.0	.395	.388	.810	2.1	1.9	.6	.2	7.7

== Personal life ==
His great-grandfather Branko was a native of Serbia who fought in World War II before emigrating to Gary, Indiana to find work in the steel mills. His mother is of ethnic Macedonian descent. Stefanovic's grandfather Zoran received a visa to the United States in 1970 and brought Stefanovic's father, Ljubiša "Lou", with him as a young child. Ljubiša Stefanović played college basketball at Illinois State and was selected by the Seattle SuperSonics in the 1985 NBA draft before playing professionally in Europe for five years. Sasha has an older brother, Dejan.

== See also ==
- List of Serbian Americans
