= Lou Stefanovic =

Serbian-American basketball player

Personal information
- Born: 1963 (age 62–63) Aleksinac, NR Serbia, FPR Yugoslavia
- Listed height: 6 ft 8 in (2.03 m)
- Listed weight: 220 lb (100 kg)

Career information
- High school: Merrillville (Merrillville, Indiana)
- College: Illinois State (1981–1985)
- NBA draft: 1985: 4th round, 97th overall pick
- Drafted by: Seattle SuperSonics
- Playing career: 1985–1990
- Position: Small forward
- Number: 35, 43

Career history
- 1985–1986: Crvena zvezda

Career highlights
- Second-team All-MVC (1985)
- Stats at Basketball Reference

Ljubiša Stefanović (Serbian Cyrillic: Љубиша Стефановић, pronounced [ʎǔbiʃa stefǎːnoʋitɕ]; born 1963), commonly known as Lou Stefanovic, is a Serbian-American former professional basketball player. He played college basketball for the Illinois State.

== College career ==
In 1981, Stefanovic went on to play for Illinois State University in Normal, Illinois. As a senior with the Redbirds in the 1984–85 season, Stefanovic averaged team-high 17.5 points and seven rebounds per game and was named to the Missouri Valley All-Second Team.

== Professional career ==
Stefanovic was selected with the 97th overall pick by the Seattle SuperSonics in the 1985 NBA draft. Following the draft, Stefanovic officially signed for a club in the Spanish ACB League. Few days before the start of the 1985–86 season, he signed a deal with Crvena zvezda of the Yugoslav Basketball League. Afterwards, he had stints in France, Switzerland, and Italy.

== National team career ==
In summer 1983, Stefanovic was an initial roster member for the Yugoslavia University team, but failed to make the final 12-man roster led by Dražen Petrović for the 1983 Summer Universiade in Edmonton, Alberta, Canada.

== Personal life ==
Stefanovic's grandfather Branko was a native of Serbia who fought in World War II before emigrating to Gary, Indiana to find work in the steel mills. His father Zoran received a visa to the United States in February 1970 and brought him as a young child.

Stefanovic married Helen, with whom he has two sons, Dejan (b. 1994) and Sasha (b. 1998). Sasha played college basketball for the Purdue Boilermakers.

== See also ==
- List of Serbian Americans
- Oklahoma City Thunder draft history
- Saint Sava Church, Merrillville, Indiana
