= Andy Stefanovich =

American business consultant

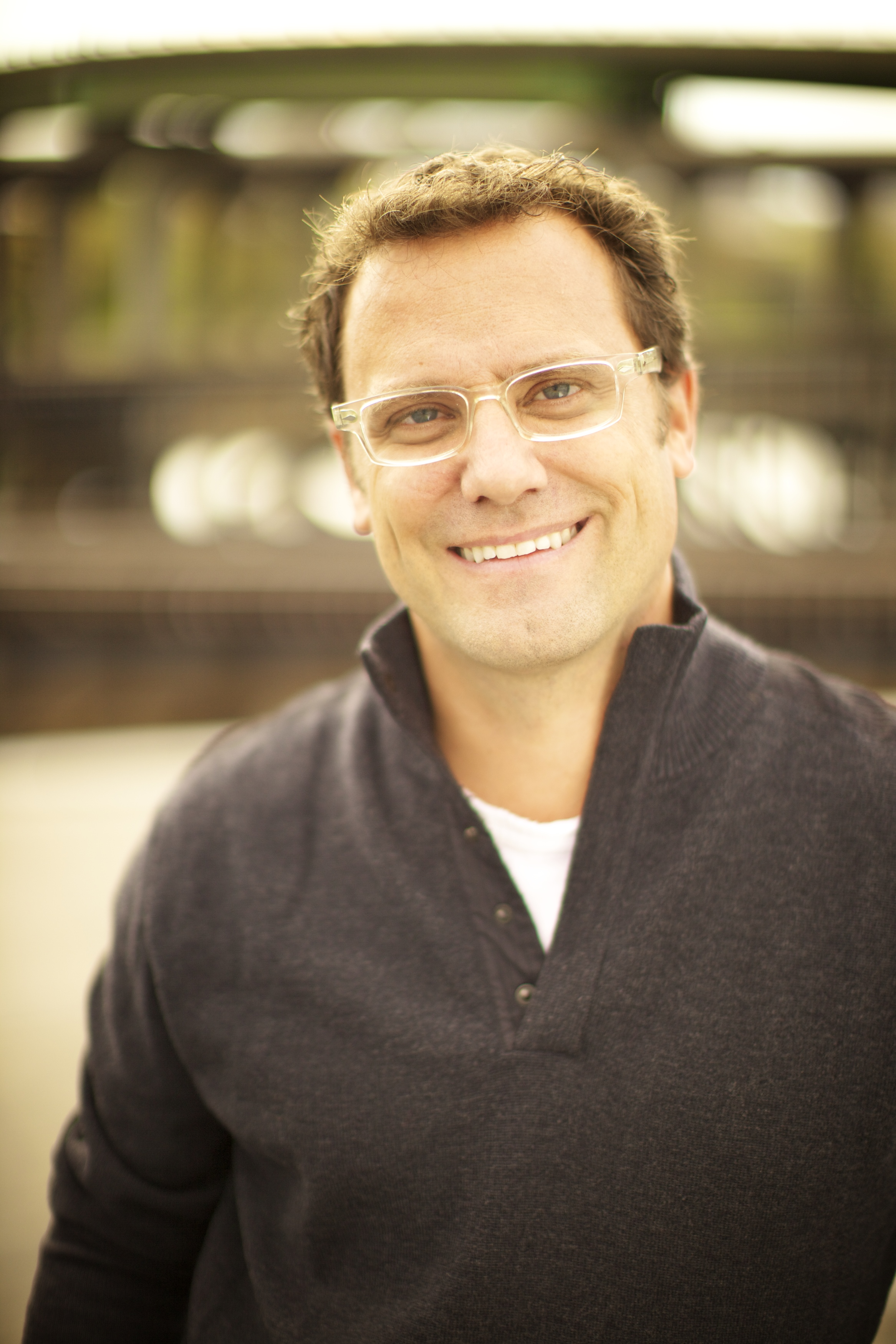
- Occupations: consultant, author, speaker
- Known for: marketing, speaking

Andy Stefanovich (born 1966) is an American speaker, bestselling author, and business consultant. A native of Detroit, Michigan, Stefanovich is currently the founding partner of a consulting firm called Life. Previously, he was a partner with Richmond, Virginia-based venture capital firm New Richmond Ventures LLC. Before that, Stefanovich was "chief curator and provocateur" at Prophet, a global business and creative consulting firm headquartered in San Francisco.

== Biography ==
Stefanovich graduated from Miami University in Ohio. In 1990, he founded Opus Event Marketing after having worked in the sales department of Ritz-Carlton. The company originally focused on event planning for corporations, but eventually shifted to product development, branding, and positioning; clients included Colgate-Palmolive, American Express, Calvin Klein, Disney, Oscar Mayer and the U.S. Olympic Committee. In 1999, the company was renamed Play, and Stefanovich remained as founder.

Play was acquired in 2009 by Prophet, where Stefanovich was named senior partner. As part of the acquisition, Play's Richmond location became part of the Prophet network of offices. Stefanovich regularly speaks at corporations such as Coca-Cola, Disney, General Electric, and Procter & Gamble.

In 2011, Stefanovich co-founded a venture capital firm called New Richmond Ventures (NRV) with Bob Mooney, Jim Ukrop, and Theodore Chandler Jr. NRV has made early-stage investments in MedCPU, PlanG, and Plugless Power. In addition to NRV, Stefanovich co-founded a second local incubator in 2012 called Men in Shirts that invests in 3 or 4 companies each year in the $50–$150,000 range. Their investments include Richmond-based men's shirtmakers, Ledbury, and a brewery named Ardent Craft Ales. In addition to capital, Stefanovich provides "marketing and strategy advice." In 2013, Stefanovich organized Richmond's first TEDx event—called TEDxRVA.

In 2011, Jossey-Bass, an imprint of Wiley Publishing published Stefanovich's first book Look at More: A Proven Approach to Innovation, Growth, and Change. Look at More was an Inc. bestseller and named one of Ad Age's "Ten Marketing Books You Should Have Read" in 2011.
