= Rasha Drachkovitch =

American television producer

- Occupations: Co-Founder and president, 44 Blue Productions
- Spouse: Stephanie Noonan Drachkovitch

Rasha Drachkovitch is an American television producer and President of 44 Blue Productions, which he co-founded with his wife, Stephanie Drachkovitch, in 1984. In that capacity, he has been the executive producer of A&E's Whalburgers, and Night Watch Animal Planet's Pit Bulls & Parolees, FS1's Pecos League, LMN's Killer Kids, and MSNBC's Lockup.

== Early life ==
His father Milorad was a Serbian university professor and his mother was a winery manager. His paternal grandfather is Milorad Drašković and his maternal grandfather is Serbian-born painter Alex Džigurski (1911–1995), who emigrated to America in 1949.

== Career ==
Drachkovitch was a producer at Los Angeles KABC-TV's for Eye on LA and Sports Line. He also served as director and editor for the syndicated sports series Greatest Sports Legends. Drachkovitch co-founded with his wife, Stephanie Noonan Drachkovitch, in 1984. The company launched with the nationally syndicated Bob Uecker's Wacky World of Sports, a sports blooper begun with an $20,000 investment.
