= Jasmina Vujic =

- Born: Loznica, Serbia
- Education: University of Michigan; University of Belgrade
- Occupation: Nuclear Engineering Professor at Berkeley
- Known for: First female head of a nuclear engineering department in the United States.

Jasmina Vujic is an American professor of nuclear engineering at the University of California, Berkeley and the first woman to serve as chair of a collegiate nuclear engineering department in the United States.

== Background ==
Born in Loznica, Serbia, Vujic grew up in the town of Šabac. She studied at Belgrade University's School of Electrical Engineering, graduating in 1977. From 1977 until 1985, she worked at the Vinča Nuclear Institute near Belgrade. After moving to the United States in 1985, Vujic obtained her Masters in 1987 and her Ph.D. in 1989, both from the University of Michigan, Ann Arbor. She then worked at the Argonne National Laboratory before starting her career at Berkeley. She has also been involved in educational initiatives in Serbia, like giving a speech at a summer math camp for children.

== Career ==
Since 1992, Vujic has taught undergraduate and graduate courses in nuclear engineering at Berkeley. She is co-director of the Berkeley Nuclear Research Center, which she also co-founded. From 2005 to 2009, she was chair of Berkeley's nuclear engineering school, making her the first American woman to head such a department.

Her current research interests include reactor core design and biomedical applications of radiation, as well as neutron and photon transport. Vujic has published over 240 papers, with about one quarter of them appearing in top archival journals. She has given numerous presentations and lectures abroad and in the United States.

Vujic is a member of RadWatch, a Berkeley project that provides data on radiation to the public. She is a leading specialist on nuclear reactors and has been quoted in the news media on such issues. From 2010 to 2012, she led the "Nuclear Engineering Department Heads Organization " in the USA. Vujic has also worked as a consultant for companies like General Electric, Transware, and VeriTainer.

=== Awards ===
Vujic has received numerous professional and charitable awards throughout her career, including Berkeley's 1996 Prytanean Faculty Award and the 1991 American Nuclear Society best paper award.

== Politics ==
In 2015, during an interview on Our Story, a Serbian television news program hosted by journalist Marina Dabic, Vujic stated that she opposed the Serbian government's sale of Telekom Srbija because the sale would eliminate thousands of jobs and enrich corrupt Serbian government officials.

In July 2020, the Daily Beast ran a story revealing that Vujic is a member of the far-right Dveri party in Serbia, and has served as their vice president. Vujic declined to comment on the story, and an official from the university noted that her activities with the group were "outside the scope of the professor's employment with the university."
