= Mitchell M. Duchich =

American philanthropist (1882–1960)

Mitchell M. Duchich (aka Mihailo Duchich) (1882–1960) was the founder of the Clover Leaf Dairy Company. Built in 1908, it was one of the earliest dairies in Gary, Indiana, as well as one of the largest employers there at that time. Actor Karl Malden's father worked there as a milkman.

As president of the Serbian National Defense Council of America, Duchich met with president Harry S. Truman in the early 1950s. Known as a philanthropist, Duchich also funded a scholarship program allowing American youth of Serbian origin to attend college.
