= Nicholas Petkovich =

American artist and priest

Nicholas Petkovich (Serbian: Никола Петковић, romanized: Nikola Petković; 18 August 1893 - 16 October 1952) was a Serbian-American artist and priest, first of the Serbian Orthodox Church, then of the Episcopal Church.

== Biography ==
Nikola Petkovich was born on 18 August 1893 in Inđija, then part of the Kingdom of Croatia-Slavonia, Austria-Hungary, today in Serbia. He was the youngest child of Mladen and Judita (née Vukičević) Petkovich. Nikola's two siblings were a sister, Ljubica, and a brother, Teodor. Their father was a successful merchant and importer. By the age of ten, Petkovich had lost both his parents: his mother before he was three, and his father before he was ten. The Petkovich estate was divided, and a trust fund was established for Nikola and the two siblings to provide for their respective education.

Petkovich graduated from the Novi Sad Gymnasium and enrolled in law school at the University of Zagreb. His brother Teodor graduated from the same law school and became a prominent judge and author of several books on philosophy. Petkovich looked up to his older brother and first thought he might follow in Teodor's footsteps. After a year, he withdrew from law school and entered the prestigious Academy of Fine Arts in Vienna.

In 1912 during the First Balkan War, he left school with some of his friends and voluntarily joined the Serbian Army. He was assigned to an army hospital in Old Serbia and when the war ended three months later, he was given an honorable discharge. Upon leaving the military, he went to a seminary to become a monk and was ordained a hieromonk. There he also studied icon and fresco painting. Upon completion in 1916, he decided to emigrate abroad. Petkovich, now Father Nikolaj, arrived in New York City with six dollars in his pocket, and a letter of introduction to a Serbian priest in Pittsburgh, Pennsylvania. For the next quarter of a century he served Serb communities in Akron and Lorain, Ohio; Butte, Montana; and Clairton and Pittsburgh, Pennsylvania. He also took up teaching art in the 1920s at Carnegie Institute of Technology (now CMU) in Pittsburgh where he remained for the rest of his life.

By 1940, he was listed in the city directory as Rev. Nikolaj Petkovich, pastor of St. Sava's Serbian Orthodox Church and resided 2107 Sidney Street, on Pittsburgh's South Side. In 1944, he appeared in the city directory as "Conversationalist," a reference to his role as Serbian language instructor for a group of U.S. soldiers being trained at the University of Pittsburgh as candidates for the Office of Strategic Services. While at St. Sava's, Father Nikolaj was separated from the Serbian Orthodox Church in 1942 when he broke his vow as a celibate priest by marrying Zora Strain. A petition was signed by parishioners asking for his reinstatement but it was all to no avail.

After leaving the Orthodox Church, Nicholas Petkovich was invited to be an assistant minister of the Calvary Episcopal Church in Shadyside. There he served on a voluntary basis and befriended Bishop Lauriston L. Scaife, and two artists Norwood Hodge MacGilvary (1874-1949), and Andrey Avinoff. All three would change the direction of Petkovich's life. Petkovich met MacGilvary while he was a student at Carnegie Tech. As associate professor of Art, MacGilvary was impressed with the talents of Nikolaj, now Nicholas, and appointed him to the faculty as "Messier", so that Petkovich need pay no tuition. Later, Petkovich would meet Dr. Avinoff, an entomologist and artist who was at the time Director of the Carnegie Museum of Natural History in Pittsburgh. When Petkovich accepted to be an assistant minister at Cavalry Episcopal Church, Avinoff was among the first to congratulate him. Sadly, however, Petkovich was to see both of those close friends, Avianoff and MacGilvary, pass away in 1949.

A few years later, Petkovich died on 16 October 1952.

== Works ==
From December 1955 and January 1956, a memorial exhibition of his art work was held in Pittsburgh. Nicholas Petkovich's works are on display at Westmoreland Museum of American Art in Greensburg, Pennsylvania, and other collections are being sold on a regular basis.

== See also ==
- Nick Lalich
- George Musulin
- George Vujnovich

== Sources ==
- Serb World U.S.A., Vol XXVIII, No. 6, July/August 2012, pages 20–27
