= Bato Govedarica =

American basketball player (1928–2006)

Personal information
- Born: April 17, 1928 Chicago, Illinois
- Died: March 13, 2006 (aged 77) Hinsdale, Illinois
- Listed height: 5 ft 11 in (1.80 m)
- Listed weight: 185 lb (84 kg)

Career information
- High school: Lane Tech (Chicago, Illinois)
- College: DePaul (1947–1951)
- NBA draft: 1951: 3rd round, 24th overall pick
- Drafted by: Syracuse Nationals
- Playing career: 1953–1954
- Position: Point guard
- Number: 14

Career history
- 1953–1954: Syracuse Nationals
- Stats at NBA.com
- Stats at Basketball Reference

Bato Zdravko Govedarica (April 17, 1928 – March 13, 2006) was a Serbian-American professional basketball player.

== Playing career ==
Govedarica attended Chicago's Lane Tech High School and DePaul University. A 5-foot-11-inch (180 cm) guard, he was inducted into the Chicago Basketball Hall of Fame on May 13, 2006. He played 23 games for the Syracuse Nationals during the 1953–54 National Basketball Association season.

== Personal life ==
Govedarica was the son of Serb immigrants Teodor and Ana from Avtovac, a village near Gacko in modern-day Bosnia and Herzegovina.

== NBA career statistics ==
Legend
GP	Games played	GS	Games started	MPG	Minutes per game
FG%	Field goal percentage	3P%	3-point field goal percentage	FT%	Free throw percentage
RPG	Rebounds per game	APG	Assists per game	SPG	Steals per game
BPG	Blocks per game	PPG	Points per game	**Bold**	Career high

=== Regular season ===
Year	Team	GP	MPG	FG%	FT%	RPG	APG	PPG
1953–54	Syracuse	23	11.3	.316	.676	.8	1.0	3.3

== See also ==
- List of Serbian Americans
