= Stojan Radic =

Stojan Radic is an electrical engineer at the University of California, San Diego in La Jolla since 2003. He was named a Fellow of the Institute of Electrical and Electronics Engineers (IEEE) in 2016 for his contributions to optical signal processing by leveraging optical fiber non-linearities.

Radic received his Ph.D. in optics from The Institute of Optics (Rochester, NY)) in 1995. He was also a chairman at the Jacobs School at Duke University.
