= Steve Vukovich =

American politician (1890–1951)

Member of the Alaska Territorial Legislature
- In office 1945–1945

Personal details
- Born: September 16, 1890 Danilovgrad, Principality of Montenegro
- Died: October 8, 1951 (age 61) Fairbanks, Territory of Alaska
- Party: Republican
- Occupation: Politician, miner, salesman

Steve Vukovich (September 16, 1890 - October 8, 1951) was a politician and salesman during Alaska's territorial period. Vukovich was born to a Montenegrin family in 1890. He immigrated to America and served in the United States Army from 1917 to 1918. He worked in Chicago before moving to frontier Alaska. He was known for traveling around the territory as a clothing salesman. Vukovich was a member of the 17th Alaska Territorial Legislature from 1945 to 1946. A longtime resident of Juneau, he died suddenly in Fairbanks while traveling for work in late 1951.
