= Drenka Willen =

Serbian-American editor, publisher and translator (born 1929)

- Born: 31 July 1929; Glina, Kingdom of Serbs, Croats and Slovenes
- Education: Birmingham University
- Occupations: Editor; translator

Drenka Opalic Willen (born 1929) is a Serbian-American editor, publisher and translator, credited for discovering authors Günter Grass, Umberto Eco, José Saramago, Amos Oz, Wisława Szymborska and others.

== Biography ==
During the proclamation of the Independent State of Croatia, Drenka fled to Belgrade with her surviving sister and mother. During World War II in 1941 after her brother, father, and numerous relatives were murdered by the Ustashas. During the war, she learned German, then Russian and English. She went to England in 1949, where she studied at Birmingham University. Between 1953 and 1956 she was an English teacher at the University of Belgrade. In 1956 she married Paul Willen, then an American journalist for Radio Free Europe, and moved to the United States. From 1961 she worked as a freelance translator from Serbo-Croatian for the Harcourt publishing house when she was commissioned by William Jovanovich to translate short stories by Ivo Andrić. Then she edited the autobiography of Milovan Djilas.

From 1981, she worked as a permanent editor for Harcourt Brace Jovanovich and took over from Helen Wolff the management of the division of foreign-language authors Helen and Kurt Wolff Books, whose writers included Umberto Eco, Georges Simenon and Günter Grass. She won over the authors Octavio Paz, José Saramago and Wisława Szymborska and proofread the translations. Other authors she won for the publisher were Italo Calvino, Margaret Drabble, A. B. Yehoshua, Ryszard Kapuściński, Danilo Kiš, Stanislaw Lem, Irving Howe, Edward Gorey, Wendy Wasserstein, Gary Krist, James Kelman, Breyten Breytenbach, Paul Klebnikov, Tomaž Šalamun, George Konrád, Yehudi Amichai, Cees Nooteboom, Amos Oz, Arturo Perez-Reverte and Charles Simic. In 1990 it was published under the title Too Loud a Solitude by Bohumil Hrabal, for which Willen hired Michael Henry Heim as a translator. From the English-language literature she supervised David Guterson and Claire Messud.

Willen bought the rights to Memorial do Convento of José Saramago in the 1980s and held on to it, although she could not sell more than 3,000 of the 5,000 printed copies of this and three other books she edited. The publisher was then able to sell 20,000 copies of the City of the Blind, which was before the Nobel Prize. In the end, it turned out that Willen had four Nobel Prize winners for literature among their authors with their English translations.

In 1998 she received the Roger Klein Award for editing. When her workplace fell victim to a company restructuring in December 2008, Grass organized an international protest at the company's management. This gave way and Willen was discontinued in January. Willen was in the process of preparing the fiftieth anniversary of the Tin Drum's appearance with a new translation by Breon Mitchell.

Drenka Willen was honored with The Center for Fiction Medal for Editorial Excellence, previously known as the Maxwell E. Perkins Award, at an awards dinner on 29 October 2007 and the sixth “Lifetime Achievement Award” of the London Book Fair in 2009. In 2013 she received the James H. Ottaway Jr. Award for the Promotion of International Literature from Words Without Borders. The United States Poet Laureate Charles Simić dedicated his poem "On This Very Street in Belgrade" to her.

== Translations ==
- Ivo Andrić: The Vizier' s elephant : three novellas. New York : Harcourt, 1961
- Mihajlo Lalić: The Wailing Mountain. New York : Harcourt, Brace & World, 1965
- Matija Bećković; Dušan Radović: Che: A permanent tragedy. New York : Harcourt, 1970
- Milovan Đilas: Memoir of a revolutionary. New York : Harcourt, 1973
- Ivan Kušan: The mystery of the stolen painting. Illustrationen Charles Robinson. New York : Harcourt, 1975
