= Alex M. Stanković =

Aleksandar Stanković, known as Alex M. Stanković, is a Serbian-born American engineer, currently at Santa Clara University and formerly at Tufts University. Stanković also held the Inaugural Alvin H. Howell Endowed Professorship in Electrical Engineering and formerly Distinguished Professor at Northeastern University, and is an Elected Institute of Electrical and Electronics Engineers Fellow. He has studied at the University of Belgrade (holding B.S. and M.S.) and the Massachusetts Institute of Technology (holding Ph.D.).

== Sources ==
- "People: Aleksandar Stanković". Tufts University. Archived from the original on May 14, 2017.
- "Aleksandar Stankovic with the Electrical & Computer Engineering Department has received $400,000.00 award from the National Science Foundation".
- "Lecture: A Sparse Sampling Approach to Dynamic Sub-Cycle Decomposition of Apparent Power in General Polyphase Networks, Dr Alex M. Stanković" (PDF). ieee.
- "Aleksandar Stankovic with the Electrical & Computer Engineering Department has received $400,000.00 award from the National Science Foundation". Santa Clara University. Retrieved 2026-02-17.
