= Michael Boro Petrovich =

Serbian American academic

Michael Boro Petrovich (Cleveland, Ohio, October 18, 1922 – Madison, Wisconsin, March 28, 1989) was a Serbian American professor, scholar, translator and author of numorous political and historical works. He was one of the founding fathers of postwar "Slavic and East European studies" across North America.

== Biography ==
=== Early life and education ===
Michael Petrovich was born in Cleveland, Ohio, on October 18, 1922, to Serbian Orthodox priest Boro Petrovich and Croatian-born Anne Marie Petrovich (née Roper). Michael Boro Petrovich graduated from Kansas City Junior College in Kansas in 1941. Two years later, he received his bachelor's degree from Western Reserve University, his master's degree in 1947, and his Doctor of Philosophy in 1955, all from Columbia University.

=== World War II ===
During World War II (between 1943 and 1945), he was an officer in the OSS. Petrovich was a member of the Independent Yugoslavia and the Allies' Mission to Josip Broz Tito in Belgrade in 1945.

=== Post-War Career ===
Petrovich's academic career began as an instructor at the University of Wisconsin at Madison from 1950 to 1953. There he was tenured as assistant professor from 1953 to 1956; associate professor from 1956 to 1960; Evjue-Bascom Professor from 1982 to 1988; and professor emeritus from 1988.

He was also a visiting professor at the University of California at Berkeley in 1956, and a visiting professor at Harvard University in 1957. He also worked closely in collaboration with publisher William Jovanovich of Harcourt Brace Jovanovich and Drenka Willen on many academic and literary projects from the 1950s to 1980s. He was a member of several scholarly societies and associations.

== Death ==
In 1987, he was diagnosed as suffering from terminal cancer. In 1988, during the annual meeting of the American Association for the Advancement of Slavic Studies (AAASS), held in Honolulu, he was unable to attend. However, he received the achievement award by mail. A few months later, he died on March 28, 1989, aged 67.

== Works ==
- "America and Russia" by Michael Boro Petrovich, published by University of Wisconsin, 1951
- "The Soviet Union" by Michael Boro Petrovich, published by Ginn, Boston, 1970
- "Conversations with Stalin" by Milovan Đilas, Michael Boro Petrovich (Translator), published by Harcourt Brace Jovanovich
- "Land Without Justice" by Milovan Đilas, Michael Boro Petrovich (Translator), published by Harcourt Brace Jovanovich in 1956
- "Petar II Petrović-Njegoš" by Milovan Djilas, Michael Boro Petrovich (Translator), published by Harcourt Brace Jovanovich, 1966
- "Wartime" by Milovan Đilas, Michael Boro Petrovich (Translator), published by Harcourt Brace Jovanovich in 1977
- "A History of Modern Serbia, 1804–1918" by Michael Boro Petrovich. Two volume set published by Harcourt Brace Jovanovich in 1976
- "The Emergence of Russian Panslavism, 1856–1870" by Michael Boro Petrovich, published by Columbia University Press, New York, 1956
- "Of Prisons and Ideas" by Milovan Djilas, Michael Boro Petrovich (translator), published by Harcourt Brace Jovanovich in 1986
- "Yugoslavia: A Bibliographic Guide", published: 1974
- "World Cultures" by Michael Boro Petrovich, published: 1995;
- "The Human Achievement" by Philip D. Curtin, Michael Boro Petrovich, published: 1967
