= William G. Salatich =

American businessperson

- Born: October 25, 1922; Chicago, Illinois, U.S.
- Died: October 28, 2009 (aged 87); Northfield, Illinois, U.S.
- Occupation: Business executive
- Employer: Gillette
- Board member of: Motorola
- Children: 4 (incl. Natalie Jacobson)

William George Salatich (October 25, 1922 – October 28, 2009) was a longtime top executive at Gillette, as well as director of the Bob Hope Desert Classic Charity Golf Tournament.

== Biography ==
Born to Serbian immigrants, he was raised in Chicago and overcame childhood poverty to become a World War II veteran.

As president of Gillette North America, Salatich headed eleven divisions at one time, including Right Guard deodorants, Paper Mate pens and the Trac II razor blades. He won many awards during his 32 years with Gillette for his innovative ad tactics and product sampling campaigns. Salatich was also recognized by "The National Conference of Christians and Jews" for hiring and promoting minorities.

Married with four children, Salatich retired in 1979 shortly before his first wife Dawn died from breast cancer. He later served on the boards of several companies, including Motorola, and remarried in 1984, to Phyllis Peterson.

He died in October 2009, at age 87, due to congestive heart failure.

He was the father of Natalie Jacobson, a Boston television news anchor.
