= William Jovanovich =

American publisher and writer (1920–2001)

William Iliya Jovanovich (6 February 1920 – 4 December 2001) was an American publisher, author, and businessman of Montenegrin-Serbian descent. He served as the director of the publishing firm Harcourt, Brace & World from 1954 to 1991, renamed Harcourt, Brace, Jovanovich in his honor in 1970. He also owned SeaWorld marine parks, and wrote both fiction and non-fiction.

== Biography ==
William Jovanovich was born Vladimir Jovanovich in Louisville, Colorado in 1920, the youngest child of a Polish mother and a Serbian father Iliya from Montenegro, who worked as a coal miner. He was educated at youth in Denver public primary schools, then pursued secondary edication at the University of Colorado Boulder from 1938-41. During his time in college he was a member of the Beta Tau Chapter of Beta Theta Pi. After graduation from college, he was commissioned an ensign in the United States Navy and served from 1942 to 1946. After serving in the Navy, he pursued a graduate degree at Columbia University.

In 1943 he married Martha Evelyn Davis, with whom he had three children.

Unable to complete graduate study after the war, he joined the publisher Harcourt Brace and Company as a college textbook salesman. He rose quickly through the company's management ranks. In 1953 he became head of Harcourt's school division and the company's president the following year (1954) at the age of 34, only seven years after starting work as a $50 a week textbook salesman. At that time, the company had 125 employees and about $8 million in sales. When he retired 46 years later, Harcourt Brace Jovanovich (HBJ), had nearly 12,000 employees (6,300 in publishing, and the rest in entertainment and other divisions) and annual sales stood at more than $1.4 Billion.

Most of his close friends were businessmen who achieved great heights, including William G. Salatich.

== Publisher ==
Throughout the years Jovanovich presided over the steady expansion of Harcourt Brace Jovanovich's enterprises, acquiring other publishing firms and even purchasing several theme parks.

In 1970, with company shareholders' approval, the firm changed its name to Harcourt, Brace, Jovanovich (HBJ). Under Jovanovich's leadership, the company published several important authors, such as Günter Grass, Umberto Eco, and Italo Calvino. Jovanovich worked directly with a number of these writers, including Hannah Arendt, Charles Lindbergh, Milton Friedman, and Mary McCarthy. Jovanovich and McCarthy first met in 1958, and their professional relationship evolved into a close personal that lasted until McCarthy's death in 1989. He also cherished his relationship with Eugene and Marta Istomin, Charles Lindbergh and Hannah Arendt. He respected the contientious work of Drenka Willen, the HBJ editor who helped many new foreign and domestic writers edit their manuscripts. During William Jovanovich's tenure the works of Sylvia Beach, Arthur C. Clarke, Edward Dahlberg, E. E. Cummings, T. S. Eliot, E. M. Forster, Hiram Haydn, Helen Hayes, Irving Howe, Jerzy Kosiński, Stanisław Lem, Anita Loos, Marshall McLuhan, Daniel Patrick Moynihan, Lewis Mumford, V. S. Pritchett, Erich Maria Remarque, Richard Rovere, Carl Sandburg, William Saroyan, Vassilis Vassilikos, Andy Warhol, Leonard Woolf were published, and promoted were the works of Serbia's poet Matija Bećković, Serbian American professor Michael Boro Petrovich, communist dissidents Milovan Djilas, Mihajlo Mihajlov, Vladimir Dedijer and Svetlana Alliluyeva, better known as Stalin's daughter.

As the years passed, Harcourt Brace Jovanovich under Jovanovich experienced stunning growth and diversification. In 1987, ten years after the move from New York City, Harcourt Brace Jovanovich fell victim to a hostile takeover effort by Robert Maxwell, a man whom Jovanovich neither respected nor liked.

In response to this unfriendly takeover attempt, William Jovanovich adopted a poison pill strategy. He borrowed nearly $3 billion in order to pay huge one-time stock dividend to the shareholders. This move made many investors happy, and although Maxwell's takeover plan was ultimately foiled, the spontaneous move left the company in significant financial straits. The huge debt forced many changes, including the selling off of many assets. Sea World was sold to Anheuser Busch in September 1989, and there was severe belt-tightening within the corporation. The resulting layoffs, restructuring, and salary freezes left many employees somewhat bitter. However, the integrity of the company was kept intact.

Soon it became evident that it would be best to ease the financial woes by selling Harcourt Brace Jovanovich outright. As a result of the decision of the board of directors, William Jovanovich stepped down as president in March 1988, as chief executive officer in December 1988, and resigned as chairman of the board of directors and retired in May 1990. His son Peter Jovanovich succeeded him as president and CEO. Harcourt Brace Jovanovich was then sold, in January 1991, to General Cinema Corporation (GC). Shortly after General Cinema took over, problems developed between the new owners and Peter Jovanovich. Peter rather abruptly left HBJ to join another publishing company, and new owners wasted no time to change the company name back to Harcourt Brace, erasing the name "Jovanovich" altogether.

Jovanovich died in 2001 at age 81 in San Diego, California after a lengthy illness.

== Author ==
In addition working as a publisher, Jovanovich also wrote a number of books:

- Now, Barabas
- Serbdom
- The Money Trail
- The Slow Suicide
- Madmen Must
- The Temper of the West: A Memoir
- The World's Last Night

He also contributed essays to a magazine, Serb World U.S.A.
