= UTHealth School of Dentistry =

Dental school in Houston, Texas, US

Coordinates: 29.6946°N 95.3931°W

The University of Texas School of Dentistry at Houston
- Type: Public
- Established: 1905
- Dean: John A. Valenza, DDS
- Location: Houston, Texas, USA
- Website: dentistry.uth.edu

The University of Texas Health Science Center at Houston (UTHealth) School of Dentistry, also known as the UTHealth School of Dentistry (formerly named the University of Texas Dental Branch at Houston), was founded in 1905. It is the oldest component unit of The University of Texas Health Science Center at Houston (UTHealth) and began as the privately owned Texas Dental College, joining UT System in 1943 under the name, "University of Texas School of Dentistry." In 1955 the school was renamed "UT Dental Branch" to parallel the name of the UT Medical Branch in nearby Galveston, but the similarity of names sometimes led the public to confuse the two institutions. With the blessing of the UT System Board of Regents, the Dental Branch returned to the name "UT School of Dentistry" on June 1, 2011.

On that same day, John A. Valenza, DDS, was named dean, after having served as interim dean since 2009. A graduate of the Class of 1981, he is the first alumnus to serve as dean in the school's history.
