= List of Serbian inventors and discoverers =

This is a List of Serbian inventors and discoverers, working locally or overseas. The list comprises people from Serbia and ethnic Serb people.

== Science, Mathematics and Technology ==
Voja Antonić:

- Galaksija home computer (1983).

Strawberry Energy:

- Strawberry Tree (solar energy device)

Josif Pančić:

- Extensively documented the flora of Serbia, classified many species of plants which were unknown to the botanical community at that time, discovered the Serbian spruce.

Jovan Žujović:

- Geologically researched and described the soil of Serbia in detail

Miloje Vasić:

- Discovery of the Neolithic site of Vinča culture

Mihailo Petrović Alas:

- Contributed significantly to the study of differential equations and phenomenology, founded engineering mathematics in Serbia, and invented one of the first prototypes of a hydraulic analog computer.

Mihajlo Pupin:

- Loading coil

Mihajlo Pupin Institute:

- HRS-100
- CER Computers
- ATLAS-TIM AT 32

Nikola Tesla:

- Induction motor
- Radio-controlled model
- Wireless power transfer
- Plasma globe
- Capacitor discharge ignition
- Magnifying transmitter
- Teleforce
- Telegeodynamics
- Teleoperation
- Tesla coil
- Tesla turbine
- Tesla's oscillator
- Tesla valve
- Wardenclyffe tower
- World Wireless System
- Violet ray
- Vacuum variable capacitor
- Pioneer in alternating current research

Slobodan Ćuk:

- Ćuk converter

Iván Gutman:

- Graph energy
- Matching polynomial

Jovan Karamata:

- Karamata's inequality
- Slowly varying function
- Improved the Hardy–Littlewood tauberian theorem

Đuro Kurepa:

- Kurepa tree

Bogdan Maglich:

- Migma

Milutin Milanković:

- Milankovitch cycles
- Revised Julian calendar (second most accurate calendar ever written)
- Calculated temperatures of the upper layers of the earths atmosphere as well as temperature conditions of planets on the inner solar system as well as depth of the atmosphere of the outer planets.

Tihomir Novakov:

- Father of black carbon
- Aethalometer

Vlatko Vedral:

- Quantum discord

Vladimir Vukićević:

- webGL
- APNG

Jovan Cvijić:

- Study of Karst
- Father of karst geomorphology

Petar Gburčik:

- Author of first mathematical models of the numerical weather prediction

Serbo-7

- Apollo (spacecraft); A team of 7 Serb engineers and scientists (known as Serbo-7) largely contributed to the Apollo project.

Roger Joseph Boscovich

- Absence of atmosphere on the moon
- Least absolute deviations

Valtazar Bogišić

- Pioneer in the sociology of law and sociological jurisprudence.

Ivan Đaja

- Pioneering work in hypothermia.

Mihajlo D. Mesarovic

- Pioneering work in the field of systems theory.

Dobrivoje Božić

- Inventor and constructor of the first railway air brake.

Lazar the Serb

- Invented and built the first known mechanical public clock in Russia in 1404.

Slobodan Đokić

- Co-creator of Azithromycin.

Pavle Savić:

- Research on interactions of neutrons in chemical physics of heavy elements. which turned out to be an important step in the discovery of nuclear fission.

Ognjeslav Kostović Stepanović

- Early plastics.

== Mechanics ==
Miomir Vukobratović:

- Powered exoskeleton
- Humanoid robot "The beginning of the development of humanoid robotics coincided with the beginning of the development of the world's first active exoskeletons at the Mihailo Pupin Institute in 1969, under the guidance of Prof. Vukobratović. Legged locomotion systems were developed first. Also, the first theory of these systems was developed in the same institute, in the frame of active exoskeletons. Hence, it can be said that active exoskeletons were the predecessors of the modern high-performance humanoid robots. The present-day active exoskeletons are developed as the systems for enhancing capabilities of the natural human skeletal system. The most successful version of an active exoskeleton for rehabilitation of paraplegics and similar disabled persons, pneumatically powered and electronically programmed was realized and tested at Belgrade Orthopedic Clinic in 1972."
- Robot locomotion
- Zero moment point "The zero moment point is a very important concept in the motion planning for biped robots. Since they have only two points of contact with the floor and they are supposed to walk, "run" or "jump" (in the motion context), their motion has to be planned concerning the dynamical stability of their whole body. This is not an easy task, especially because the upper body of the robot (torso) has larger mass and inertia than the legs which are supposed to support and move the robot. This can be compared to the problem of balancing an inverted pendulum."

Rajko Tomović:

- Prostethic five-fingered hand

== Medicine and Pharmacology ==
Miodrag Radulovacki:

- Pioneering pharmacological studies for the treatment of sleep apnea.

Gordana Vunjak-Novakovic

- Pioneering research in tissue engineering and regenerative medicine.

== Linguistics ==
Vuk Karadžić:

- Serbian Cyrillic alphabet

== Culture, Arts & Architecture ==
First Serbian uprising:

- Balkan brass

A distinctive style of music originating in the Balkan region as a fusion between military music and folk music. In recent years, it has become popular in a techno-synth fusion throughout Europe, and in pop music in the Anglo sphere and throughout the world. American bands such as Fifth Harmony and Gogol Bordello have brought the style to a new audience.

Ljubomir Micić:

- Zenitism

Đurađ Branković:

- Serbian epic poetry

Nemanjić dynasty:

- Raška architectural school
- Serbo-Byzantine architecture

Lazar Hrebeljanović:

- Morava architectural school

Miscellaneous:

- Serbo-Byzantine Revival architecture
- Kolo, a dance

== Fashion ==
Nikola Bizumić:

- Hair clipper
- Buzz cut

"Manual hair clippers were invented by the Serbian inventor named Nikola Bizumić. Before the advent of the electrically powered Clippers, these clippers were widely used by barbers to chop hair close and fast. The clipper accumulates hair in locks to rapidly depilate your head. This type of haircut is normal in the military in addition to among boys in schools where strict grooming conventions will be in effect."

== Military ==
Miodrag Tomić:

- Dogfight
- Fighter aircraft

The first aerial dogfight occurred during the Battle of Cer (15–24 August 1914), when Serbian aviator Miodrag Tomić encountered an Austro-Hungarian plane while performing a reconnaissance mission over Austro-Hungarian positions. The Austro-Hungarian pilot initially waved, and Tomić reciprocated. The Austro-Hungarian pilot then fired at Tomić with his revolver. Tomić produced a pistol of his own and fired back. Tomić managed to escape, and within several weeks, all Serbian and Austro-Hungarian planes were fitted with machine-guns.

Kosta Milovanović:

- Designer of the rifle called "mauser-kokinka", lauded as one of the best rifles in the world at the end of 19th century.

== See also ==
- List of Serbian inventions and discoveries

== Sources ==
- Blume, August G. (1968). Miller, Jr., Thomas G. (ed.). "Cross and Cockade Journal". History of the Serbian Air Force. Vol. 9, no. 3. Whittier, California: The Society of World War I Aero Historians.
- Buttar, Prit (2014). Collision of Empires: The War on the Eastern Front in 1914. Oxford, England: Osprey Publishing. ISBN 978-1-78200-648-0.
- Glenny, Misha (2012). The Balkans: 1804–2012. New York, New York: Penguin Books. ISBN 978-1-77089-273-6.
