= List of Serbian inventions and discoveries =

Serbian inventions and discoveries are objects, processes or techniques invented or discovered by Serbian people.

== List ==
Invention/discovery	Inventor/discoverer
Hair clipper (and buzz cut)	Nikola Bizumić
Ćuk converter	Slobodan Ćuk
Strawberry Tree (solar energy device)	Strawberry Energy
Extensively documented the flora of Serbia, classified many species of plants which were unknown to the botanical community at that time, discovered the Serbian spruce.	Josif Pančić
Geologically researched and described the soil of Serbia in detail	Jovan Žujović
Discovery of the Neolithic site of Vinča culture	Miloje Vasić
Contributed significantly to the study of differential equations and phenomenology, founded engineering mathematics in Serbia, and invented one of the first prototypes of a hydraulic analog computer.	Mihailo Petrović Alas
Graph energy Matching polynomial	Iván Gutman
Karamata's inequality Slowly varying function	Jovan Karamata
Kurepa tree	Đuro Kurepa
Migma	Bogdan Maglich
Milankovitch cycles Revised Julian calendar (second most accurate calendar ever written)	Milutin Milanković
Father of black carbon Aethalometer	Tihomir Novakov
Loading coil	Mihajlo Pupin
HRS-100 CER Computers ATLAS-TIM AT 32	Mihajlo Pupin Institute
Quantum discord (one of discoverers)	Vlatko Vedral
webGL APNG	Vladimir Vukićević
Powered exoskeleton (developed at the same time as the General Electric / US Armed Forces "Hardiman")	Miomir Vukobratović
Prostethic five-fingered hand	Rajko Tomović
Design of the modern alternating current (AC) electricity supply system, Induction motor (invented at the same time as one by Galileo Ferraris), Plasma globe, Tesla coil, Tesla turbine, Tesla's oscillator, Tesla valve, Violet ray	Nikola Tesla
Galaksija (computer)	Voja Antonić
Early plastics	Ognjeslav Kostović Stepanović
Karst and a number of geographical theories related to the Balkans	Jovan Cvijić
Apollo (spacecraft); A team of 7 Serb engineers and scientists (known as Serbo-7) largely contributed to the Apollo project.	Serbo-7
Absence of atmosphere on the moon Least absolute deviations	Roger Joseph Boscovich
Pioneer in the sociology of law and sociological jurisprudence.	Valtazar Bogišić
Pioneering work in hypothermia.	Ivan Đaja
Pioneering research in tissue engineering and regenerative medicine.	Gordana Vunjak-Novakovic
Pioneering work in the field of systems theory.	Mihajlo D. Mesarovic
Inventor and constructor of the first railway air brake.	Dobrivoje Božić
Invented and built the first known mechanical public clock in Russia in 1404.	Lazar the Serb
Co-creator of Azithromycin.	Slobodan Đokić
Designer of the rifle called "mauser-kokinka", lauded as one of the best rifles in the world at the end of 19th century.	Kosta Milovanović
Research on interactions of neutrons in chemical physics of heavy elements. which turned out to be an important step in the discovery of nuclear fission.	Pavle Savić
He led the first successful laboratory cultivation and serial propagation of Measles and Hepatitis B virus.	Milan Milovanović
Serbian Cyrillic alphabet	Vuk Karadžić

== See also ==
- List of Serbian inventors and discoverers
