= Kalbfleisch =

Kalbfleisch is a German surname. Notable people with the surname include:

- George Randolph Kalbfleisch (1931–2006), US physicist
- Girard Edward Kalbfleisch (1899–1990), US judge
- James G. Kalbfleisch (1940–2017), Canadian academic
- Martin Kalbfleisch (1804–1873), Dutch-American politician
- Walter Kalbfleisch (1911–1960), Canadian hockey player

== See also ==
- F. W. Kalbfleisch, former Germany publishing company
