= SolarJOOS =

Solar JOOS, Inc.
- Type: Privately owned
- Industry: Solar Energy, Solar Chargers, Renewables
- Founded: 2008
- Headquarters: California
- Website: www.solarjoos.com

SolarJOOS was a solar power company founded in 2008. The company builds an efficient and rugged portable solar charger used to charge cell phones and other portable electronic devices. The company's product, the JOOS Orange, won the 2011 Consumer Electronics Association's Best of Innovations Award and was featured in the Best of Innovations Showcase at the 2011 CES event in Las Vegas, Nevada.

== JOOS Orange ==
The JOOS Orange, the company's first product, uses a solar panel (solar photovoltaics or solar PVs) to generate the electricity needed to charge an on-board battery. The device is then used to power or recharge portable electronic devices. A graphical user interface (GUI) can be downloaded by the user to track their solar energy production and encourage good green behavior.

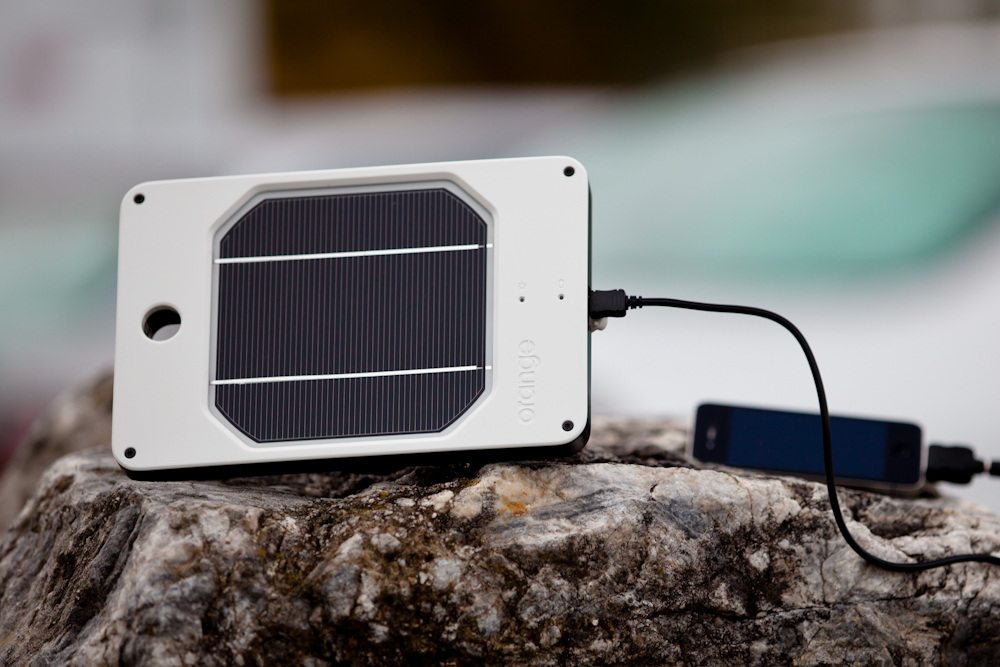
The JOOS Orange by SolarJOOS

== The company ==
SolarJOOS is based in California.

== Media ==
SolarJOOS has been featured on local and national news, and in magazines and publications worldwide. In August 2011, Fox News featured a hurricane preparedness review of the JOOS Orange demonstrating its durability and water resistance. Gizmodo and Wired Magazine gave the JOOS Orange high ratings calling it "the physical manifestation of simplicity. It's rugged, easy to store and carry, and (most importantly) quick to bestow a watt or two whenever you need it." U.S. Airways also featured the JOOS Orange on the cover of its magazine, touting it as one of the Top 12 Tech Tools of 2011.

== See also ==
- Solar charger
- Solar power in the United States
- Photovoltaics
- Energy harvesting
