= Ognjeslav =

Ognjeslav is a given name. Notable people with the name include:

- Ognjeslav Stepanović Kostović (1851–1916), Serbian inventor
- Ognjeslav Utješenović (1817–1890), Serbian politician
