= Lynn Stevenson =

American physicist and professor (1923–2021)

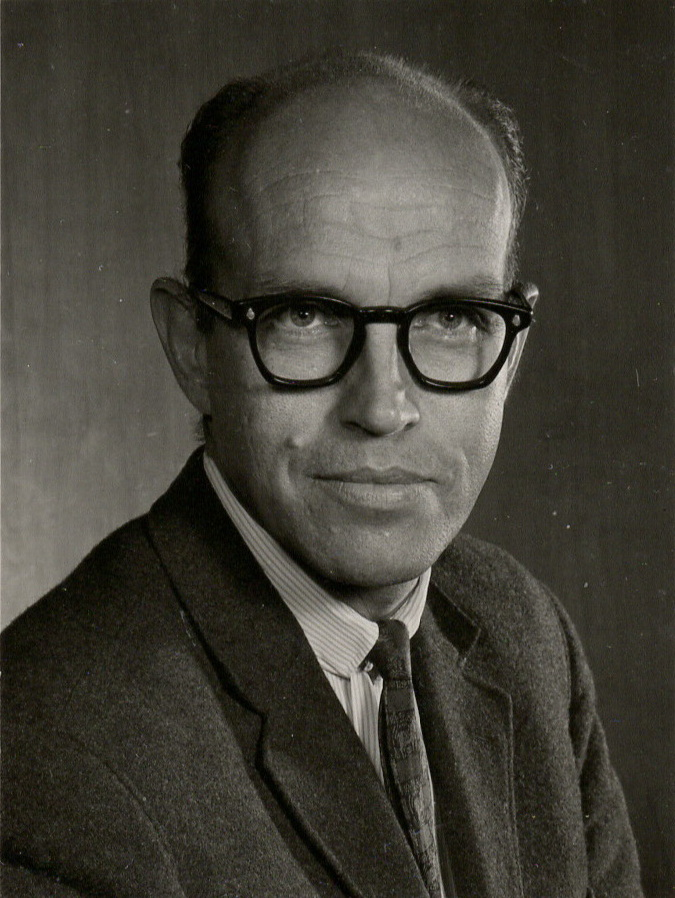
- Born: October 31, 1923; Ogden, Utah, United States
- Died: April 10, 2021 (aged 97); Berkeley, California, United States
- Education: City College of New York, University of California, Berkeley
- Spouse: Lois Griffin Stevenson (m. 1948)
- Children: Leslie, Scott, Jeffrey, Conrad, Cybele
- Scientific career
- Fields: Physics
- Workplaces: University of California, Berkeley

Merlon Lynn Stevenson (October 31, 1923 – April 10, 2021) was an American physicist. He cofounded Luis Walter Alvarez's research group at the Lawrence Berkeley National Laboratory. His first paper presented internationally described proton-generated mesons using results generated by the lab's cyclotron.

Among doctoral candidates he advised are George Kalbfleisch, John Marriner, and Bill Gary. In 1966-1967 he held a visiting professorship at the University of Heidelberg in Germany.

During World War II, Stevenson enlisted at Fort Douglas; following basic training, he volunteered as an aeronautics engineer. The Army sent him to City College of New York where he was educated in mechanical engineering. He was then sent to Fort Belvoir in order to learn both the setting-up and the defusing of mines. However, he was, instead of Europe, sent to Okinawa by Army Intelligence to analyze aerial photographs.

Stevenson was an avid bicyclist who, as a member of the East Bay bicycle coalition in the early 1970s, helped establish bike paths and bike racks for campus buses.

Stevenson retired in 1991 and was named professor emeritus. Shortly thereafter he was diagnosed with Parkinson's disease.
