= Dobromani =

Dobromani Добромани
- Village
- Location within Bosnia and Herzegovina
- Coordinates: 42°48′N 18°10′E
- Country: Bosnia and Herzegovina
- Entity: Republika Srpska
- Municipality: Trebinje
- Time zone: UTC+1 (CET)
  - Summer (DST): UTC+2 (CEST)

Dobromani (Serbian Cyrillic: Добромани) is a village in the municipality of Trebinje, Republika Srpska, Bosnia and Herzegovina. It was the permanent home of Rajko Tomović, a Serbian scientist who developed research programs in robotics, medical information technology, biomedical engineering, rehabilitation engineering, artificial organs, and other disciplines
