= Rajko Tomović =

Serbian and Yugoslav scientist (1919–2001)

- Born: 1 November 1919; Baja, Hungary
- Died: 30 May 2001 (aged 81); Belgrade, Federal Republic of Yugoslavia
- Known for: Multifunctional hand prosthesis, CER-10 computer, Repet.Dif.Analyzer RDA
- Awards: National 7 July Award, AVNOJ Award
- Scientific career
- Fields: Physics, Robotics
- Workplaces: Institute "Mihajlo Pupin" and ETF

Rajko Tomović (1919–2001) was a Serbian and Yugoslav scientist, who developed research programs in robotics, medical information technology, biomedical engineering, rehabilitation engineering, artificial organs, and other disciplines. He is officially credited for creation of the first artificial hand with five fingers in 1963 in Belgrade. A subsequent version, the USC Belgrade hand -- a collaboration between Tomović and roboticist George A. Bekey at the University of Southern California in Los Angeles -- became a landmark in the history of robotic hands. Tomović was a member of Serbian Academy of Sciences and Arts (SANU).

== Biography ==
Rajko Tomović was born in Baja, Hungary, in 1919. In 1938, he commenced his undergraduate education at the Department for Electro-Mechanical Engineering of the Technical University of Belgrade in 1938.

World War II dramatically changed his life, but he persisted in studies and graduated in 1946 with excellence. After graduation he started his highly productive career, characterised by scientific and cultural collaboration. With his extraordinary language skills, and excellent overall education, he communicated at the highest scientific level with colleagues from the Soviet Union, European countries, and North America. In 1952, Tomović received a doctorate in Technical Sciences from the Academy of Sciences of Serbia.

In 1950, Tomović started scientific work in the Vinča Institute of Nuclear Sciences. His main interests during the "Vinča period" were analog computers, and he greatly contributed to first analog, digital and hybrid computers ever built in Vinča.

== Robotic science ==
In 1960 he moved to the Institute "Mihajlo Pupin" to pursue research in the field of anthropomorphic robotics and water engineering. In 1962, Rajko Tomović joined the Faculty of Electrical Engineering in Belgrade at the Department for Automatic Control. While at the University, Tomović started programs in robotics, information technologies in medicine, bio-medical engineering, rehabilitation engineering, artificial organs, and many other important disciplines that are reaching maturity today. The first artificial hand with five fingers in the world was made in 1963 in Belgrade by academician Tomović and his associates. These so-called "Belgrade hands" are now in the Museum of Robotics in Boston. In the 1980s, Bekey and Tomović worked closely to improve the hand. Bekey and his team added sensors, motors and control systems while greatly improving the device's reliability. Unlike other hands being developed at the time, the Bekey-Tomović version had an adaptable structure that enabled the hand to grasp and hold random objects.

In Belgrade, 1972, Tomović made an exoskeleton which was the first machine designed for walking disability. This machine is now in the Museum of Robotics in Moscow. Tomović was also assisted by Miomir Vukobratović and his team. Tomović retired from official duties at the Faculty of Electrical Engineering, yet he never stopped being engaged in various projects, or student supervision, at both the Faculty of Electrical Engineering and in the Academy of Sciences and Arts of Serbia (SANU) where he developed new initiatives, and continued to educate young researchers.

Rajko Tomović spent time in the U.S. contributing greatly to the development of new views and methods in robotics, biomedical engineering, and computer sciences. During this period he built a lifelong cooperation with scientists from the University of California, Los Angeles (UCLA), University of Southern California (USC), Los Angeles, Ohio State University, Columbus, Ohio, and many other research institutions. His contacts and communication spread over Canada, the U.S., the Soviet Union, Poland, Czechoslovakia, Hungary, Bulgaria, France, Germany, Greece, Italy, and many other countries. He was a chief of project CER-10, the first Yugoslav digital computer from 1960.

== Academy of Science memberships ==
Based in his research results and his contributions to science he was elected as a member of the Vojvodina Academy of Science and Arts (VANU), and afterwards he became a member of the Serbian Academy of Sciences and Arts (SANU). He was also elected as an external member of the Slovenian Academy of Academy of Sciences and Arts (SAZU). Tomović was decorated with the highest state medals and awards. He received the National 7 July Award, the AVNOJ Award, and much recognition for his research.

== Social and cultural activities ==
Tomović was one of the founders of the Yugoslav Committee for Electronics, Telecommunication, Automatics and Nuclear Sciences (ETAN), Yugoslav Society for Computers, Yugoslav Society for Biomedical Engineering, Center for Multidisciplinary Studies of the University of Belgrade, Center for Strategic Social and Technical Planning in Novi Sad, and many other institutions. He was a member of various high-level state organizations and a recognized member of the only political party in Yugoslavia.

== Work ==
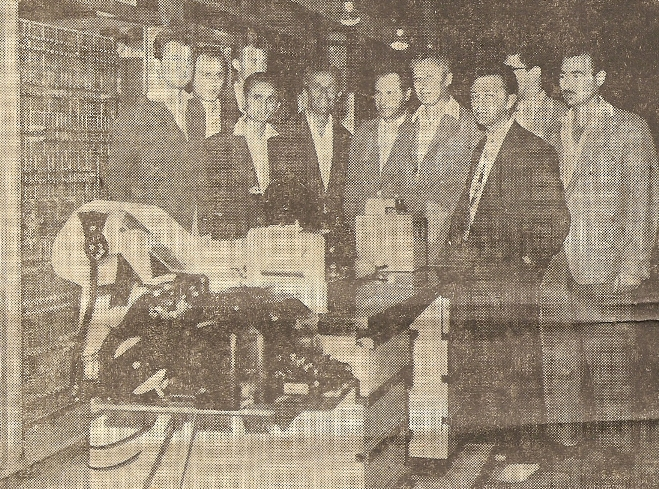
Picture of the designers group of CER-10, the first Yugoslavian digital computer at the M.P. Institute, Belgrade

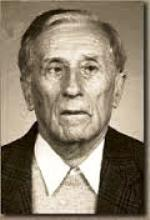
Academician Dr Rajko Tomović, ETF Belgrade

During the period 1955 to 1990 he worked on several pioneering scientific and technological developments. Many of these activities received global attention. His book about High-speed Analog Computers (with Walter J. Karplus) published in 1962 introduced the concept of electronic device systems for a repetitive (analog) computer facility. It was published in French, English, and Russian.

He authored the first monograph dealing with sensitivity theory of dynamical systems together with Dr. Miomir Vukobratović. Tomović was the author of the textbook Nonlinear Systems (1983) with Prof. Srdjan Stanković and the book Limitations of the Formal System Theory (1979) with Walter J. Karplus.

One his best-known results was the multifunctional hand prosthesis, developed in collaboration with Prof. Miodrag Rakić that is now exhibited in the Museum of Robotics in Boston. In the 1980s, together with colleagues from the Universities of Novi Sad and Belgrade, Tomović promoted the Belgrade NSC robotic hand, which was at the time one of the most powerful robotic grasping devices. In the early eighties, Tomović was leading a project for Veterans Administration Center, New York City, that resulted in the only powered and externally controlled self-contained transfemoral prosthesis that reached the world market. It was a type of artificial leg. Tomović participated in and contributed to many designs and development projects including the first analog and digital computers for the Yugoslav army and defense systems. As a world-recognized expert and leader in the field, Tomović was frequently invited to teach and consult in other ways at various universities, international meetings, specialized workshop, and major funding agencies.

Rajko Tomović was constantly involved in the organization of scientific and engineering meetings, summer schools, and workshops that took place in Yugoslavia. These meetings were for a long time a unique opportunity for East and West to meet. Yugoslavian meetings became places where scientists from the Soviet Union and other Eastern-bloc countries met with their colleagues from North America and Western Europe. The series of 10 triennial international meetings "Advances in External Control of Humans Extremities", known as the Dubrovnik meetings, resulted in 10 historic Proceedings that are used as the basic reference for the work in the rehabilitation of humans with an impact on movement.

Tomović supervised many masters and doctoral students. The students of Rajko Tomović became world renowned experts in their fields. In 1984, Dr. Norman Kaplan, Director of the National Science Foundation, Washington, D.C., depicted Rajko Tomović's personality, as that of a renaissance scientist.

Tomović authored more than 150 scientific papers; most of those in peer-reviewed journals. He was and is frequently cited, and some of his works opened important technical developments. Together with Dr. Dejan B. Popović and Richard B. Stein, he published the first monograph in the world about non-analytical methods for motor control in 1995. He wrote many invited encyclopedia chapters and authored other books dealing with robotics, biomedical engineering, and automation.

== Books ==
- Technology and Society
- High Speed Analogue Computers
- Introduction to Nonlinear Automatic Control Systems
- Sensitivity analysis of dynamic systems (McGraw-Hill electronic sciences series)
- Non-analytical Methods for Motor Control
- General Sensitivity Theory (Modern analytic and computational methods in science and mathematics)

== Personal life ==
Tomović was active in the political life of Yugoslavia, mostly working as an advisor and consultant. Throughout his life, Tomović never compromised his cosmopolitan ideals. Tomović sought to balance his scientific and other activities, especially later in his life, studying arts and philosophy. The piano and his collection of CDs were close to hand and he greatly enjoyed classical music. The little pillow in front of the CD player and old gramophone, a large collection of CDs and LP records, and headphones that can eliminate daily noise, were all parts of his living room furniture. Reading the classics in mathematics and philosophy a source of much inspiration for Tomović. He was also involved actively in playing sports, especially rowing. He had the second-best result in rowing in his age group for several years, and he constantly wanted to improve his performance while rowing with professional youngsters on the Sava River around his famous Ada Ciganlija Island. Tennis was his hobby. His permanent home was in Dobromani village, Bosnia and Herzegovina, where he owned a house.
