= Bogdan Maglich =

American physicist (1928–2017)

- Born: August 5, 1928; Sombor, Yugoslavia
- Died: November 25, 2017 (aged 89); Newport Beach, California, US
- Education: University of Belgrade; University of Liverpool; Massachusetts Institute of Technology
- Scientific career
- Thesis: Polarization of protons in high-energy interactions (1959)
- Doctoral advisor: Bernard T. Feld

Bogdan Cvete Maglić (anglicized Maglich, August 5, 1928 – November 25, 2017) was a Serbian-American experimental nuclear physicist and the leading advocate of a purported non-radioactive aneutronic fusion energy source. Maglich built four models of Migma, devices producing fusion of deuterium atoms in colliding ion beams.

== Education and academic work ==
Maglich received his Bachelor of Science degree from the University of Belgrade in 1951, his Master of Science from the University of Liverpool in 1955, and his Ph.D. in high-energy physics and nuclear engineering from the Massachusetts Institute of Technology in 1959.

Upon receiving his Ph.D., Maglich joined Dr. Luis Walter Alvarez's research group at Lawrence Berkeley Lab. During this time, he, along with Fred Kirsten, invented the "sonic spark chamber", the first film-less spark chamber particle detector system.

Maglich participated in the discovery of the omega meson, as described in Alvarez's Nobel lecture:

Although Bogdan Maglich originated the plan for this search, and pushed through the measurements by himself, he graciously insisted that the paper announcing the discovery should be co-authored by three of us who has developed the chamber, the beam, and the analysis program that made it possible.

Between 1963 and 1967, he worked at the European Organization for Nuclear Research (CERN) in Geneva, Switzerland. While conducting research at CERN, he invented the "missing mass spectrometer". With this instrument, his team of French and Swiss physicists reported the discovery of seven mesons.

In 1967, Maglich joined the faculty of the University of Pennsylvania, as well as being visiting faculty at Princeton University. In 1969, he became professor and principal investigator for high energy physics at Rutgers University. In 1974, he left academia to pursue his research in the private sector.

== Early work ==
Maglich first rose to prominence in his field working on a team at the University of California's Lawrence Radiation Laboratory analyzing liquid hydrogen bubble chamber data from Berkeley's bevatron accelerator. The team, which also included Luis W. Alvarez, Arthur H. Rosenfeld, and Lynn Stevenson, discovered the first solid experimental evidence for the existence of the ω meson resonance. (In 1968, Luis Alvarez was awarded a Nobel Prize for this and related work.)

Maglich's contribution to this discovery led to him receiving a White House citation from President John F. Kennedy and being named an honorary citizen in Switzerland by the president of the Swiss Confederation.

Toward the end of the 1960s, R. Macek and Maglich proposed "the principle of self colliding orbits" and the perceptron, a self-colliding particle beam accelerator originally proposed for studying pion-pion collisions. Shortly thereafter, in the early 1970s, the perceptron design formed the basis for Maglich's "migmatron" concept of a self-colliding ion beam fusion reactor.

== Business ventures ==
In his attempts to raise funding for his magma research, Maglich has been associated with a string of business ventures. In 1974, he formed MIGMA Institute of High Energy Fusion, Fusion Energy Corp.

From 1985 to 1987, he was CEO and principal investigator of Aneutronic Energy Labs of United Sciences, Inc. at Princeton, a research firm also known as AELabs. It was during this time that Maglich worked under a research grant from the United States Air Force to attempt to develop his migmatron concept into a compact power source for spacecraft with Bechtel Corp. From 1988 to 1993, he was CEO of Advanced Physics Corporation, chaired by Glenn T. Seaborg.

In 1995, Maglich founded HiEnergy Microdevices, which later became HiEnergy Technologies, Inc., a developer and manufacturer of neutron-based bomb detection equipment based on his invention of "atometery".

He continued to occupy various positions with that company until being terminated for cause. Sixteen months after Maglich's departure, HiEnergy Technologies declared bankruptcy in 2007 but was restructured with the formation of Clear Path Technologies, Inc. Under new management, Clear Path Technologies was able to commercialize "atometry" into various award-winning threat materials and explosives detection devices sold to state, federal and foreign government counter-terrorism agencies.

After leaving HiEnergy Technologies, Maglich became the chief technology officer of California Science & Engineering Corporation (CALSEC).

== Personal life ==
The son of a lawyer and elected member of the Yugoslav Royal Parliament, Maglich (at age 13) and his mother were imprisoned in a Croatian Ustaše (Nazi-affiliated) concentration camp for Serbs, but managed to escape.

Maglich has five children: Angelica (born 1989) and Aleksandra Maglich (born 1991), from a prior marriage to UCLA media artist Victoria Vesna; also Marko (born 1960), Ivanka (born 1961) and Roberta (born 1972).

== See also ==
- Pavle Savić
- Milan Bulajić
