= Srdjan Stankovic =

Montenegrin electrical engineer (born 1964)

Srdjan Stanković
- Born: May 9, 1964 (age 62); Plav, Montenegro
- Education: B.Sc. (Hons) in Electrical Engineering from the University of Montenegro in 1988; M.Sc. in Electrical Engineering from the University of Zagreb, Croatia, in 1991; Ph.D. degree in Electrical Engineering from the University of Montenegro in 1993
- Scientific career
- Fields: Multimedia systems; Digital signal processing; Digital Electronics Devices; Compressive sensing; Time-frequency analysis; Digital watermarking
- Workplaces: University of Montenegro

Srdjan Stankovic (also published under Srdjan Stanković and Srđan Stanković; born 1964) is a Montenegrin scientist and a full professor at the Faculty of electrical engineering, University of Montenegro.

== Education and scientific interest ==
Srdjan Stanković (1964) is a Montenegrin scientist and a full professor at the Faculty of Electrical Engineering, University of Montenegro. He obtained a BSc degree in Electrical Engineering from the University of Montenegro in 1988 and his MSc degree in Electrical Engineering from the University of Zagreb, Croatia, in 1991. In 1993, he obtained a Ph.D. degree in Electrical Engineering from the University of Montenegro. Currently, he is a Full Professor at the Faculty of Electrical Engineering, University of Montenegro.

The areas of his research interests are Digital Signal Processing, Digital Electronics, and Multimedia Systems.

== Career ==
Stanković was a Dean of the Faculty of Electrical Engineering - University of Montenegro (2007–2013) and Vice-Rector of the University of Montenegro (2014–2015). He is a Senior IEEE Member. He served as a Lead Guest Editor of the IET Signal Processing (2014), Lead Guest Editor of the EURASIP Journal on Advances in Signal Processing (2010), Guest Editor of Signal Processing (2010), and was an Associate Editor of the IEEE Transactions on Image Processing (2005–2009).

He was also a Member of the Board of Directors of Montenegrin Broadcasting Company (2005–2019), a President of the Board of Directors of Montenegrin Broadcasting Company (2005–2006 and 2017–2019), a President of the National Council for Higher Education (2018–2019), and an Extraordinary and Plenipotentiary Ambassador of Montenegro in the Argentina Republic, Buenos Aires (2019–2021).

== Awards ==
Stanković received the "Best Column Award" for the paper published in the IEEE Signal Processing Magazine. In 2017, he received a "Best Paper Award" from the European Association for Signal Processing (EURASIP) 2017 for a paper published in the Signal Processing journal. The Ministry of Science of Montenegro awarded professor Stanković as the Leader of the Best Scientific Project in Montenegro in 2011. He is a scholarship holder of the Alexander von Humboldt Foundation.

== International collaboration ==
Stanković collaborated with the Department of Informatics at the Aristotle University in Thessaloniki (1998), Darmstadt University of Technology - Signal Theory Group (1999–2000), and the University of Applied Sciences Bonn-Rhein-Sieg - Department of Computer Science (2002).

During 2004–2007, Stanković periodically visited E3I2 Laboratory, ENSIETA, Brest, France, while in the period 2007–2010 he collaborated with King's College London - Centre for digital signal processing research and Moscow State University Lomonosov - Laboratory of mathematical methods of image processing. One academic year (2012–2013) he spent at the Villanova University - Centre for Advanced Communications. Stanković collaborated with the National Polytechnic Institute of Toulouse, University of Toulouse. He has a continuous collaboration with GIPSA Laboratory at INP Grenoble where he spent one semester in 2014. In 2016 he visited Swanson School of Engineering - University of Pittsburgh and Heidelberg Collaboratory for Image Processing, Heidelberg University.

== Publications ==
Stanković published more than 100 scientific papers in the leading scientific journals (out of more than 300 journal and conference papers authored or co-authored by professor Stanković). He is an author of the book "Multimedia Signals and Systems: Basic and Advanced Algorithms for Signal Processing", Springer (2016) and he is the co-author of three monographs in English dealing with Time-Frequency Analysis.

Selected works:

1. Stanković, S.; Stanković, L. (1996). "Introducing time-frequency distribution with a 'complex-time' argument". Electronics Letters. 32 (14): 1265. Bibcode:1996ElL....32.1265S. doi:10.1049/el:19960849.
2. Stankovic, Srdjan; Orovic, Irena; Zaric, Nikola (March 2010). "An Application of Multidimensional Time-Frequency Analysis as a Base for the Unified Watermarking Approach". IEEE Transactions on Image Processing. 19 (3): 736–745. Bibcode:2010ITIP...19..736S. doi:10.1109/TIP.2009.2033624. PMID 20172773. S2CID 10405047.
3. Stanković, Ljiša; Orović, Irena; Stanković, Srdjan; Amin, Moeness (September 2013). "Compressive Sensing Based Separation of Nonstationary and Stationary Signals Overlapping in Time-Frequency". IEEE Transactions on Signal Processing. 61 (18): 4562–4572. Bibcode:2013ITSP...61.4562S. doi:10.1109/TSP.2013.2271752. S2CID 995800.
4. Stanković, Srdjan; Orović, Irena; Stanković, Ljubiša (1 November 2014). "An automated signal reconstruction method based on analysis of compressive sensed signals in noisy environment". Signal Processing. 104: 43–50. doi:10.1016/j.sigpro.2014.03.049.
5. Stanković, Srdjan; Orović, Irena; Stanković, Ljubiša (1 January 2017). "Polynomial Fourier domain as a domain of signal sparsity". Signal Processing. 130: 243–253. arXiv:1411.3651. doi:10.1016/j.sigpro.2016.07.015. S2CID 13931650.
