= Solar charger =

Small device to convert solar energy to electricity

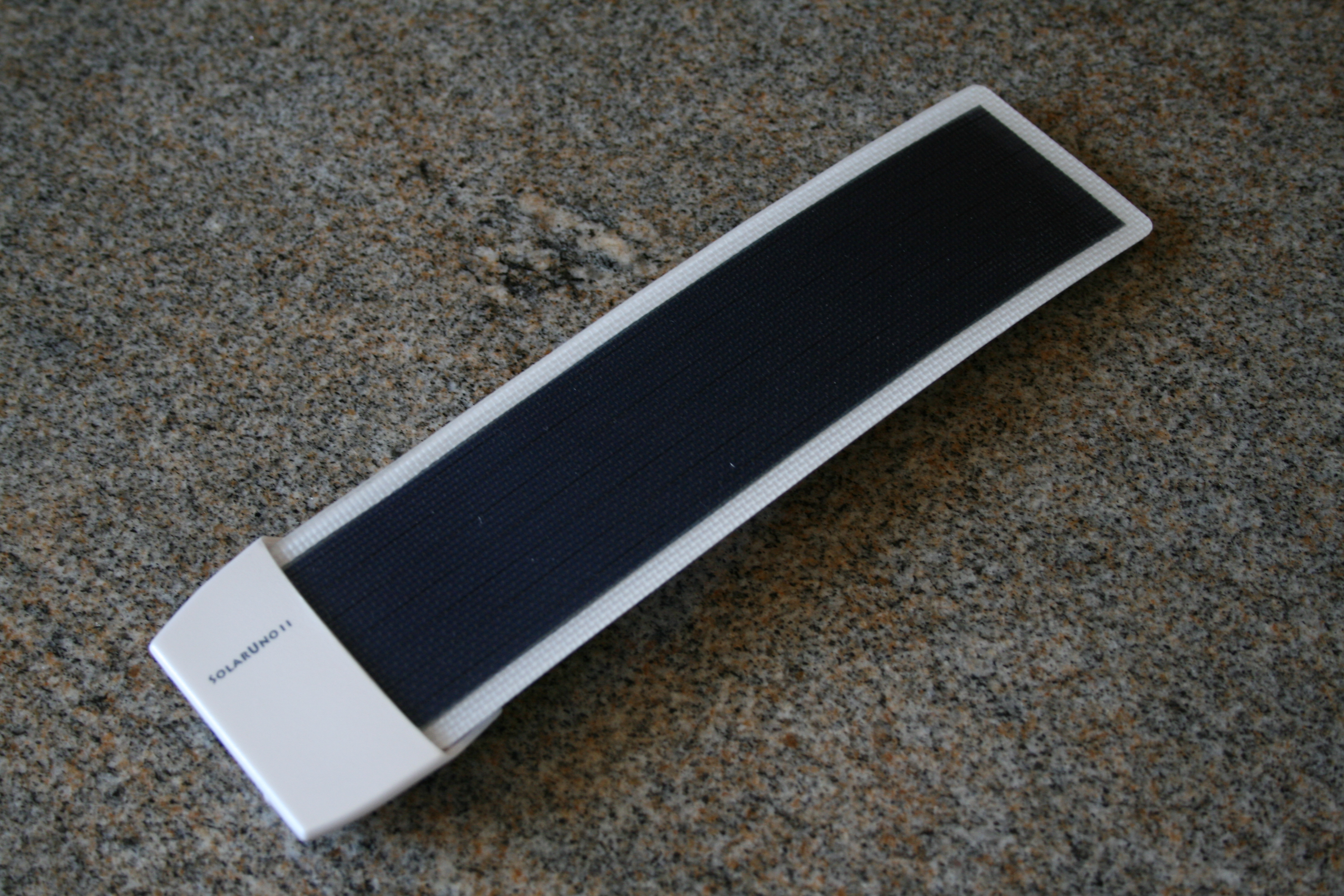

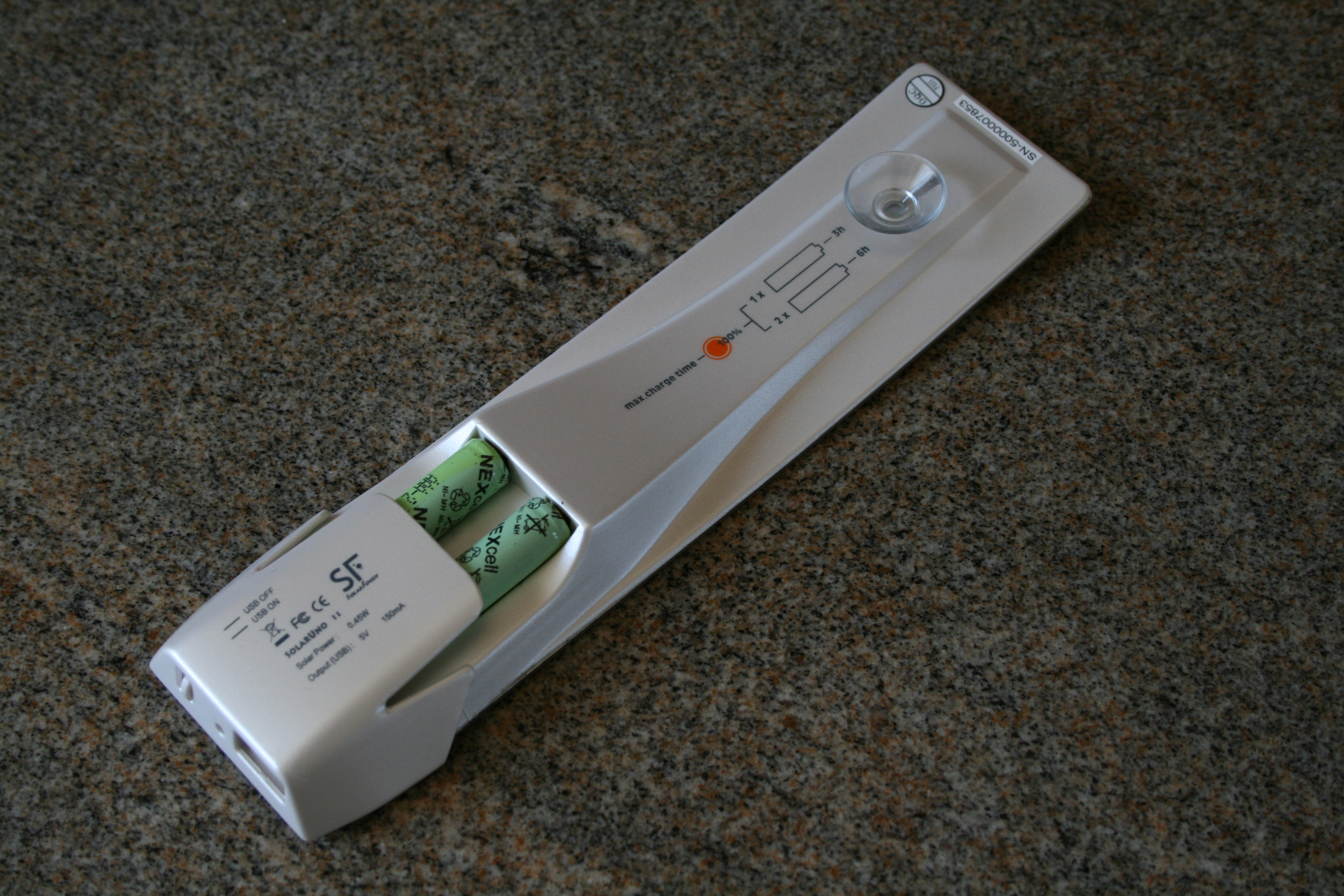
Front and back views of a small, portable solar charger with two AAA batteries and USB output

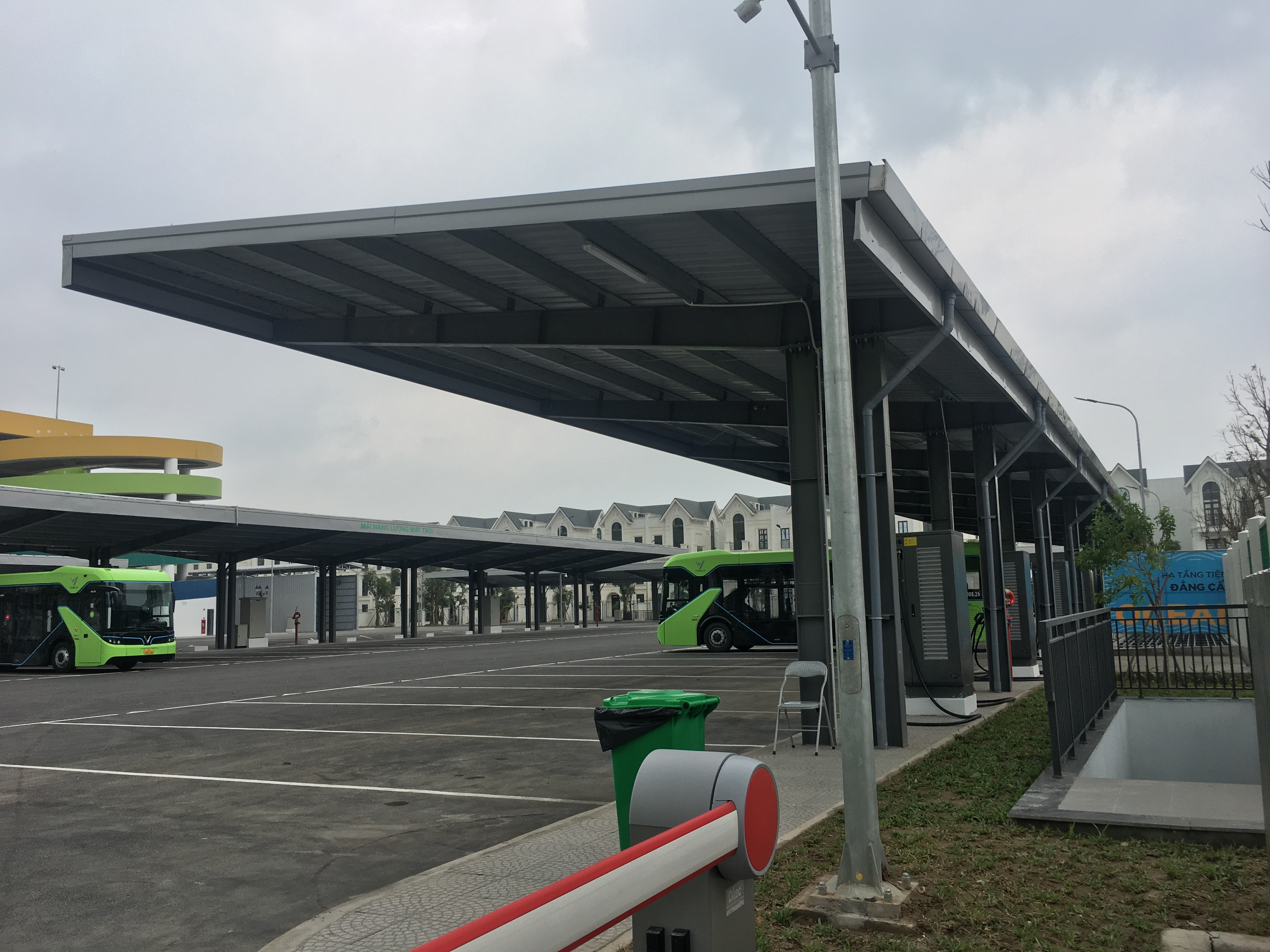
Charging station for battery electric bus VinBus

A solar charger is a charger that employs solar energy to supply electricity to devices or batteries. They are generally portable.

Solar chargers can charge lead acid or Ni-Cd battery banks up to 48 V and hundreds of ampere hours (up to 4000 Ah) capacity. Such type of solar charger setups generally use an intelligent charge controller. A series of solar cells are installed in a stationary location (ie: rooftops of homes, base-station locations on the ground etc.) and can be connected to a battery bank to store energy for off-peak usage. They can also be used in addition to mains-supply chargers for energy saving during the daytime.

Most portable chargers can obtain energy from the sun only. Examples of solar chargers in popular use include:

- Small portable models designed to charge a range of different mobile phones, cell phones, iPods or other portable audio equipment.
- Fold out models designed to sit on the dashboard of an automobile and plug into the cigar/12v lighter socket to keep the battery topped up while the vehicle is not in use.
- Flashlights/torches, often combined with a secondary means of charging, such as a kinetic (hand crank generator) charging system.
- Public solar chargers permanently installed in public places, such as parks, squares and streets, which anyone can use for free.

== Voltage regulator ==
A solar panel can produce a range of charging voltages depending upon sunlight intensity, so a voltage regulator must be included in the charging circuit so as to not over-charge (overvoltage) a device such as a 12 volt car battery.

== Solar chargers on the market ==
Portable solar chargers are used to charge cell phones and other small electronic devices on the go. Chargers on the market today use various types of solar panels, ranging from thin film panels with efficiencies from 7-15% (amorphous silicon around 7%, CIGS closer to 15%), to the slightly more efficient monocrystalline panels which offer efficiencies up to 18%.

The other type of portable solar chargers are those with wheels which enable them to be transported from one place to another and be used by a lot of people. They are semi-public, considering the fact that are used publicly but not permanently installed.

The solar charger industry has been plagued by companies mass-producing low efficiency solar chargers that don't meet the consumer's expectations. This in turn has made it hard for new solar charger companies to gain the trust of consumers. Solar companies are starting to offer high-efficiency solar chargers.

Portable solar power is being utilized in developing countries to power lighting as opposed to utilizing kerosene lamps which are responsible for respiratory infections, lung and throat cancers, serious eye infections, cataracts as well as low birth weights. Solar power provides an opportunity for rural areas to "leapfrog" traditional grid infrastructure and move directly to distributed energy solutions.

Some solar chargers also have an on-board battery which is charged by the solar panel when not charging anything else. This allows the user to use the solar energy stored in the battery to charge their electronic devices at night or when indoors.

Solar chargers can also be rollable or flexible and are manufactured using thin film PV technology. Rollable solar chargers may include Li-ion batteries.

=== Cell phone chargers ===
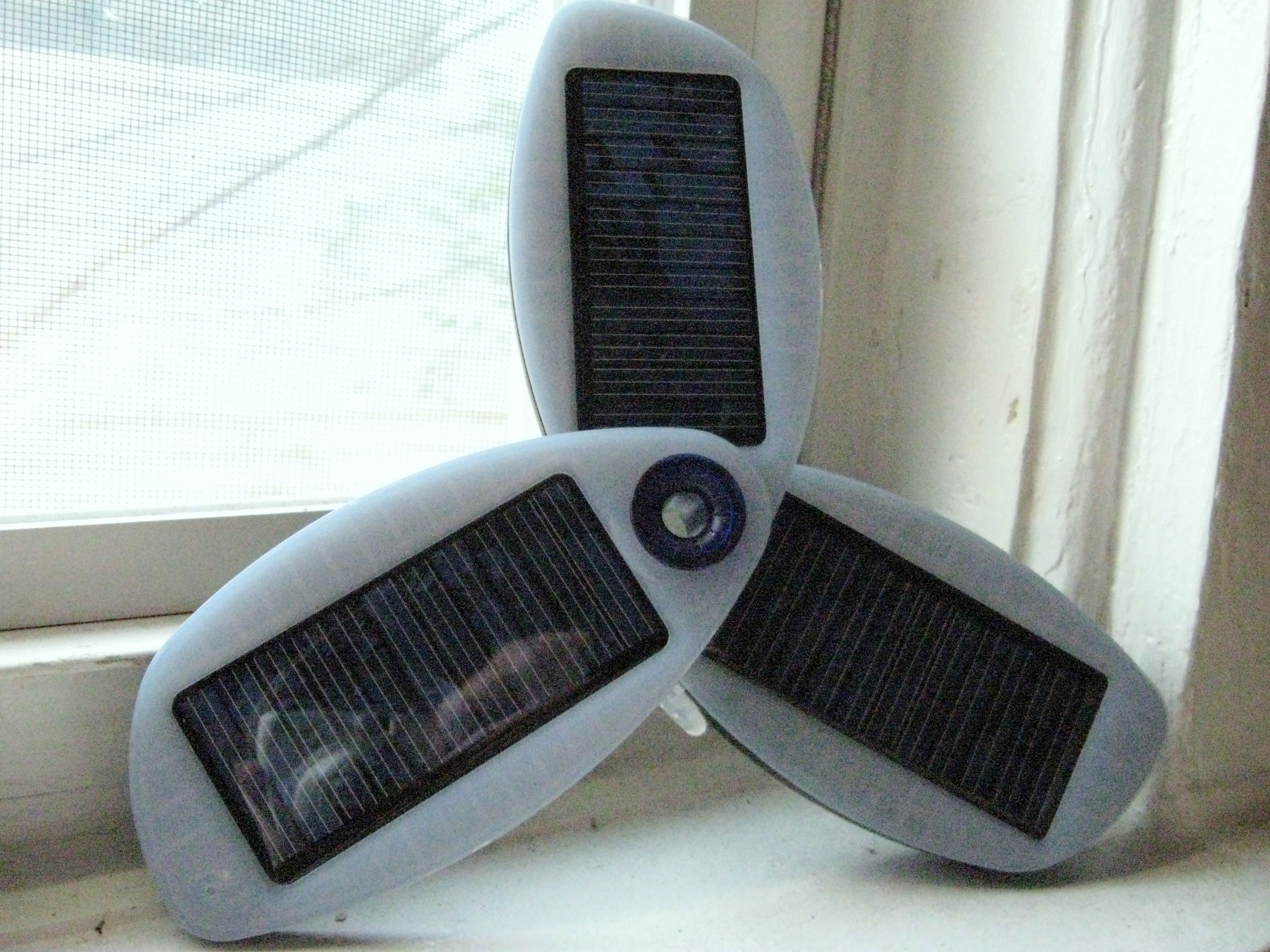
Solar cell phone charger

Solar cell phone chargers use solar panels to charge cell phone batteries. They can be used when no electricity supply is available—either mains or, for example, a vehicle battery—and are sometimes suggested as a way to charge phones without consuming mains electricity, unlike electrical cell phone chargers. Some can also be used as a conventional charger by plugging into an electrical outlet. Some chargers have an internal rechargeable battery which is charged in sunlight and then used to charge a phone; others charge the phone directly.

There are also public solar chargers for mobile phones which can be installed permanently in public places such as streets, park and squares. One such is the Strawberry Tree public solar charger.

Street Charge was a solar-powered phone charging station developed by NRG Energy, Inc., designed to grant free phone charging services to pedestrians and tourists. The charging stations can also be modified to emit Wi-Fi signals and display advertisements. The appliance was released in 2013, and the original prototype was tested in Brooklyn, New York. A collaboration between NRG Energy, Inc. and AT&T to implement Street Charge units throughout New York City that was planned to each offer six USB ports. This project will cost around $300,000-500,000. There was a concern was that the wiring might be modified by malicious users to steal or wipe data from devices plugged into the device.

One cell phone model was reported in 2010 to have a built in solar charger. Solar chargers are commercially available for cellphones.

Solar cell phone chargers come in different shapes and configurations including folding (Goal Zero, Endless Sun Solar) and types that unfold like petals (Solio).

They also come in the form of straps, with solar cells on the outer surface and a rechargeable battery inside. Solar cell technology limits the effectiveness and practicality of phone solar chargers for everyday use. Phone charge times vary depending on the solar panel size and efficiency, or the battery capacity of models with batteries, further extending the charge times of solar chargers. The fold-out design provides a larger solar panel, hence higher charge current, and is compact when not in use.

Solar chargers can be used to charge other rechargeable devices with requirements similar to a mobile phone, such as Bluetooth headsets and music players.

Solar chargers used to charge a phone directly, rather than by using an internal battery, can damage a phone if the output is not well-controlled, for example by supplying excessive voltage in bright sunlight. In less bright light, although there is electrical output it may be too low to support charging, it will not just charge slower.

== Gallery ==
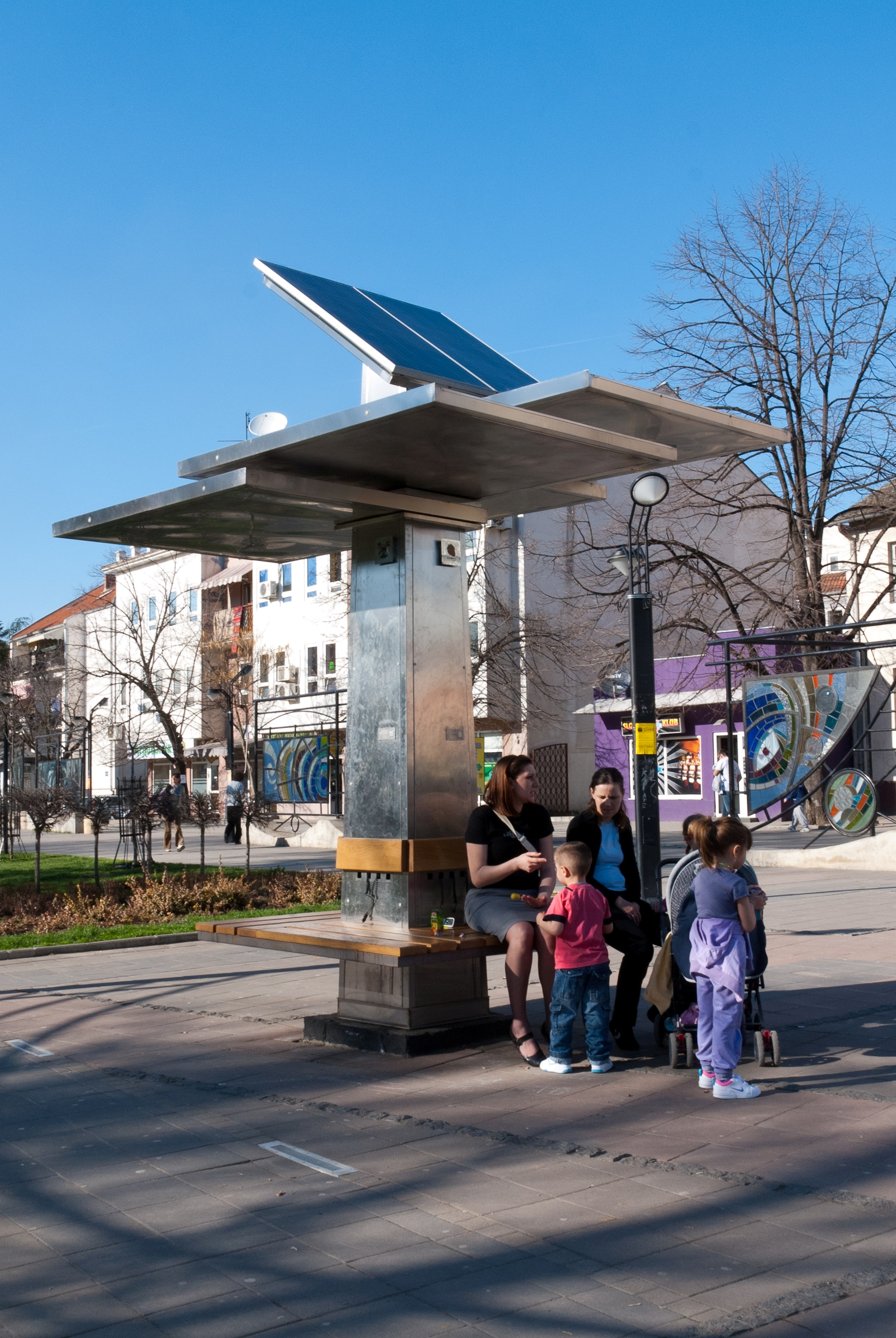
A public solar charger installation, the Strawberry Tree, in Obrenovac, Serbia

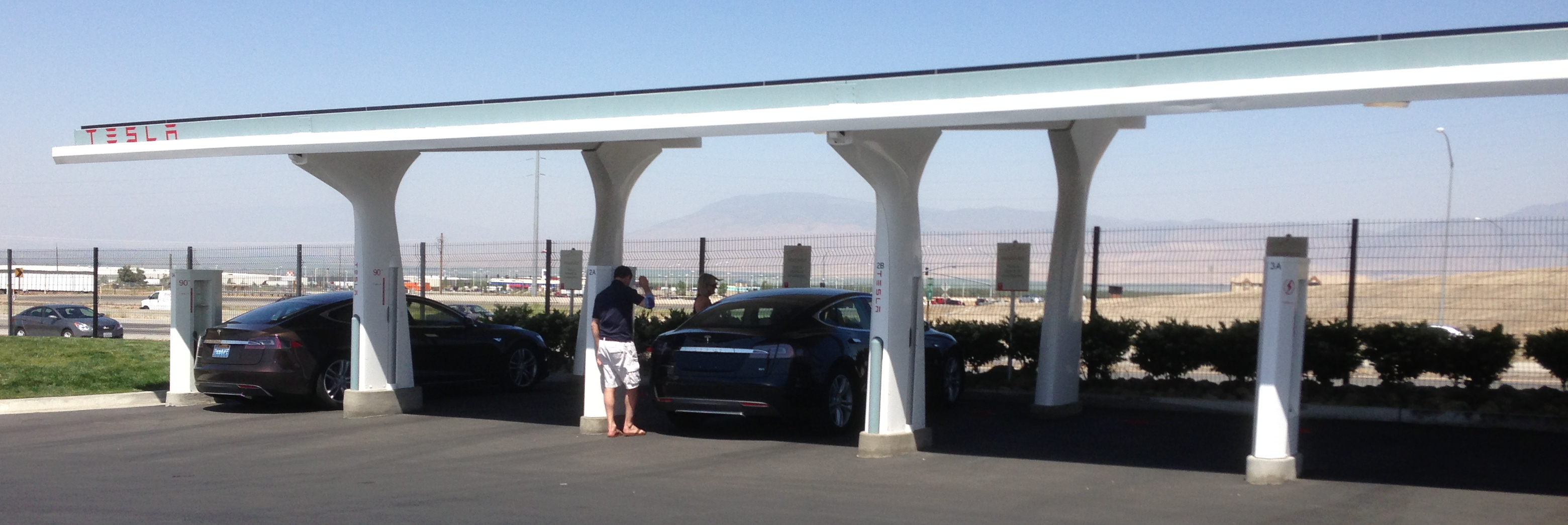
Tesla supercharger rapid charging station, California. The stationary solar arrays are on top.

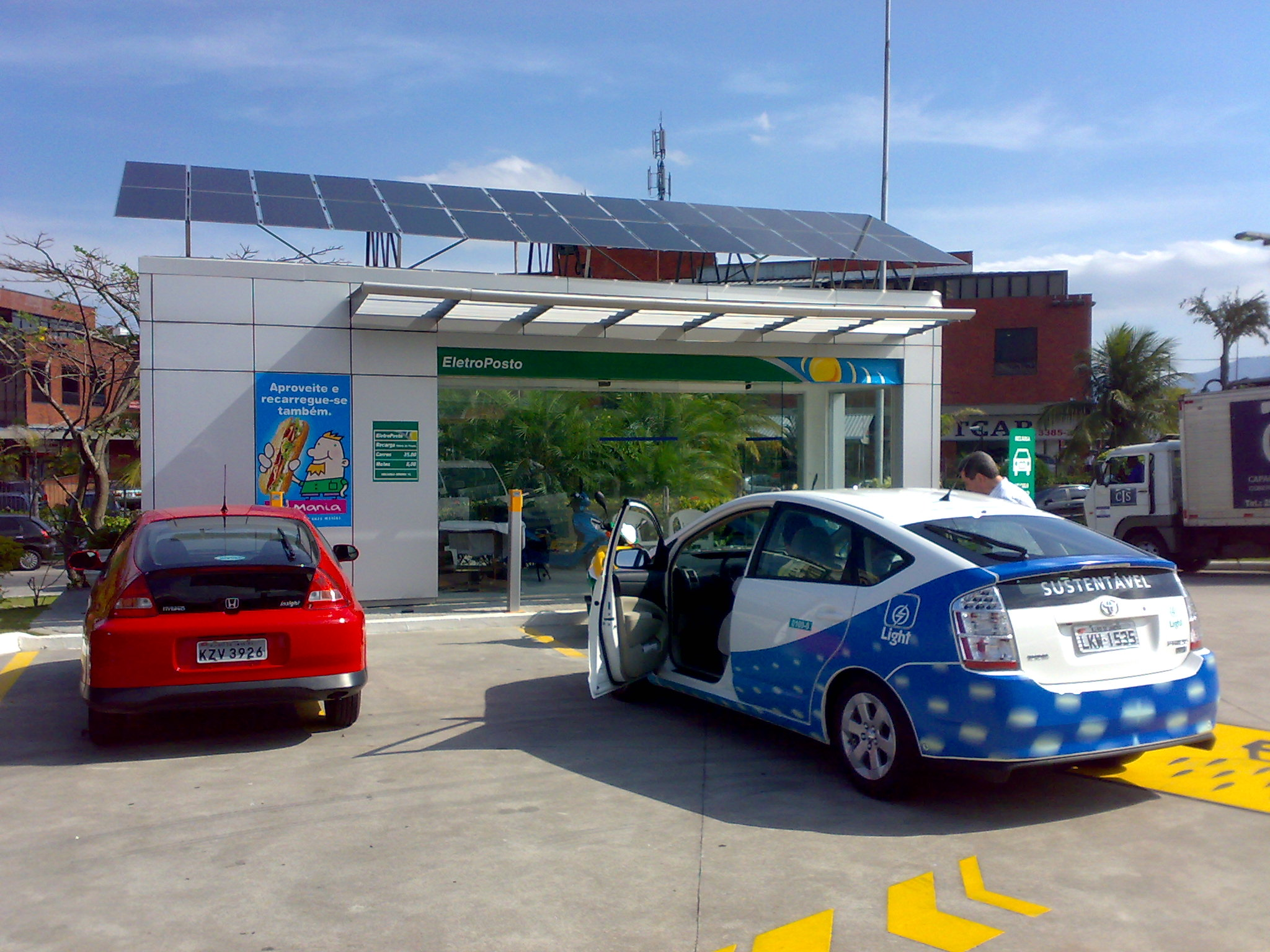
Charging station at Rio de Janeiro, Brazil, owned by Petrobras, with stationary solar arrays.

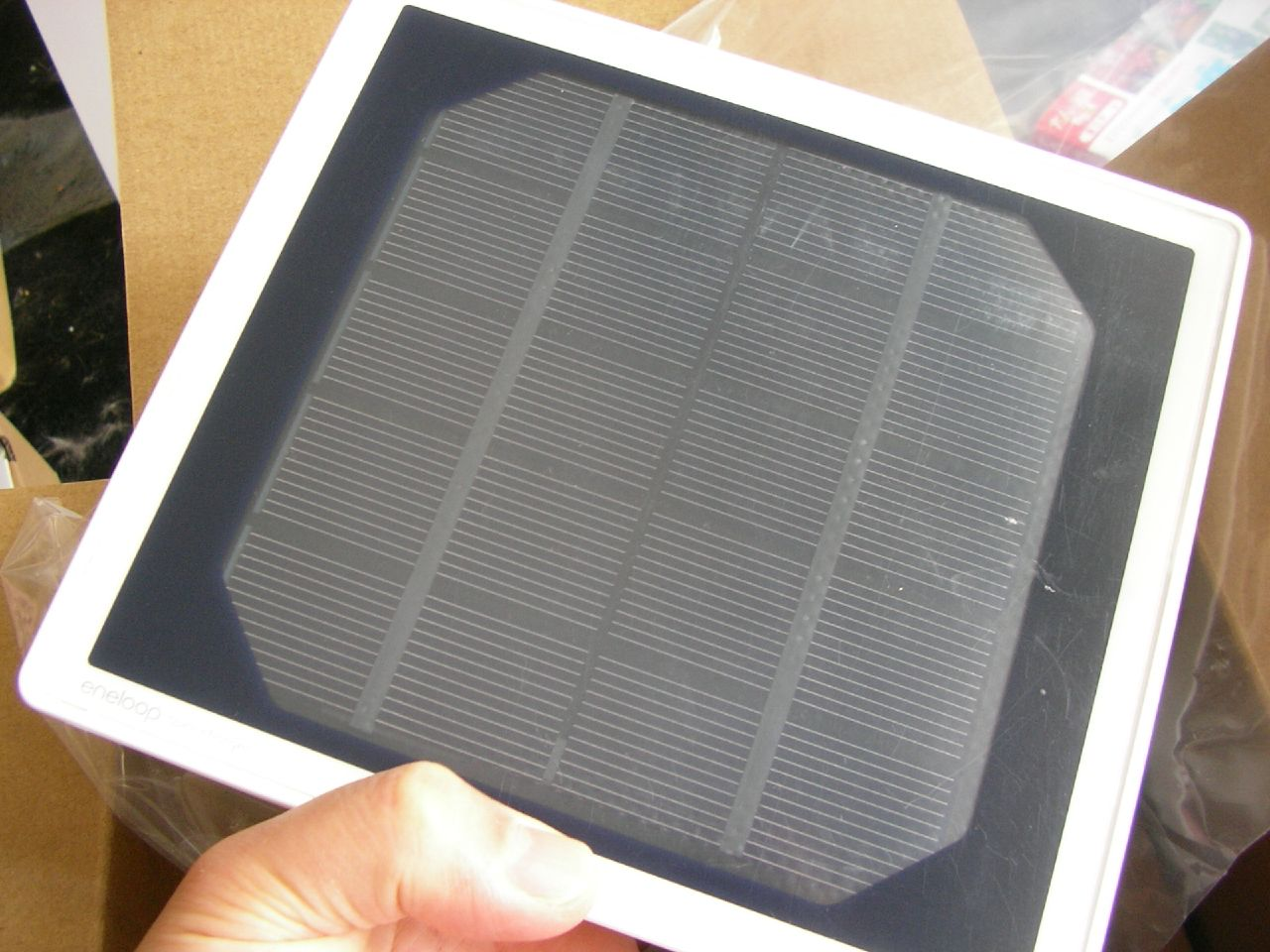

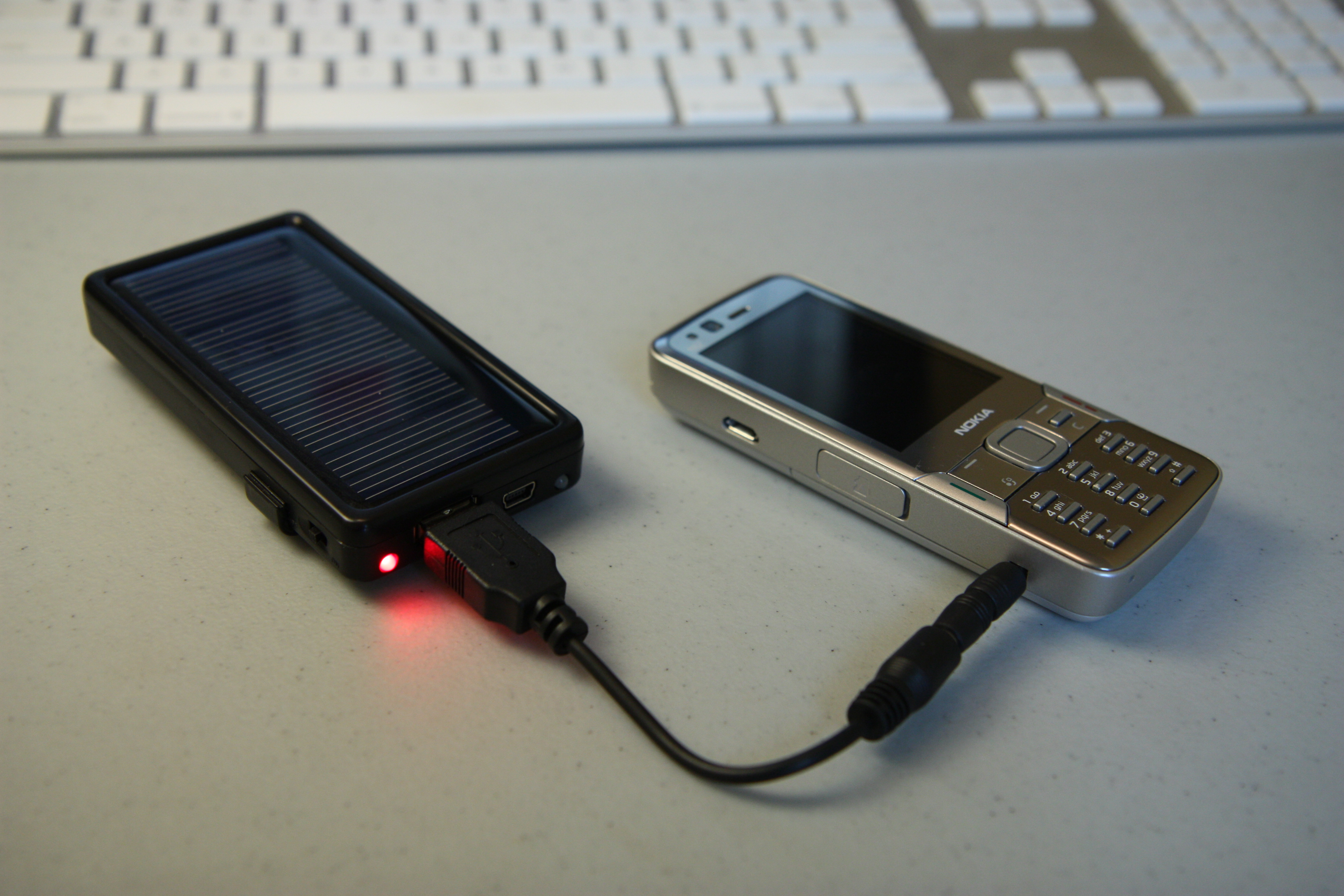

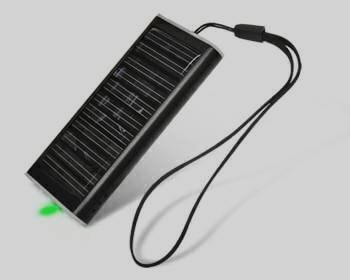

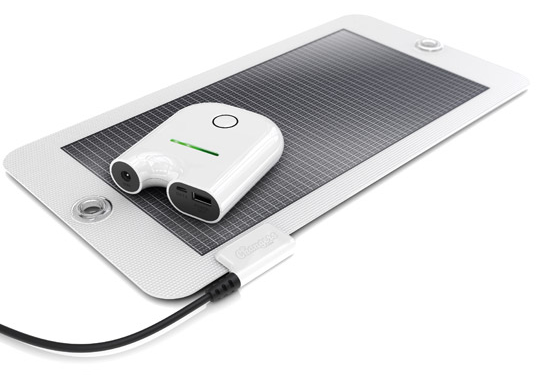

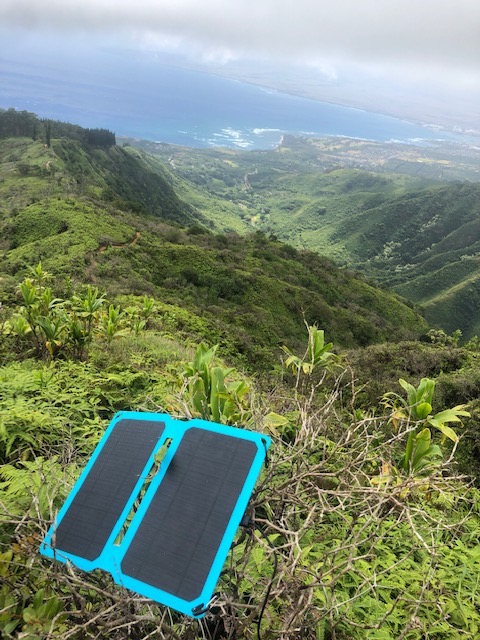

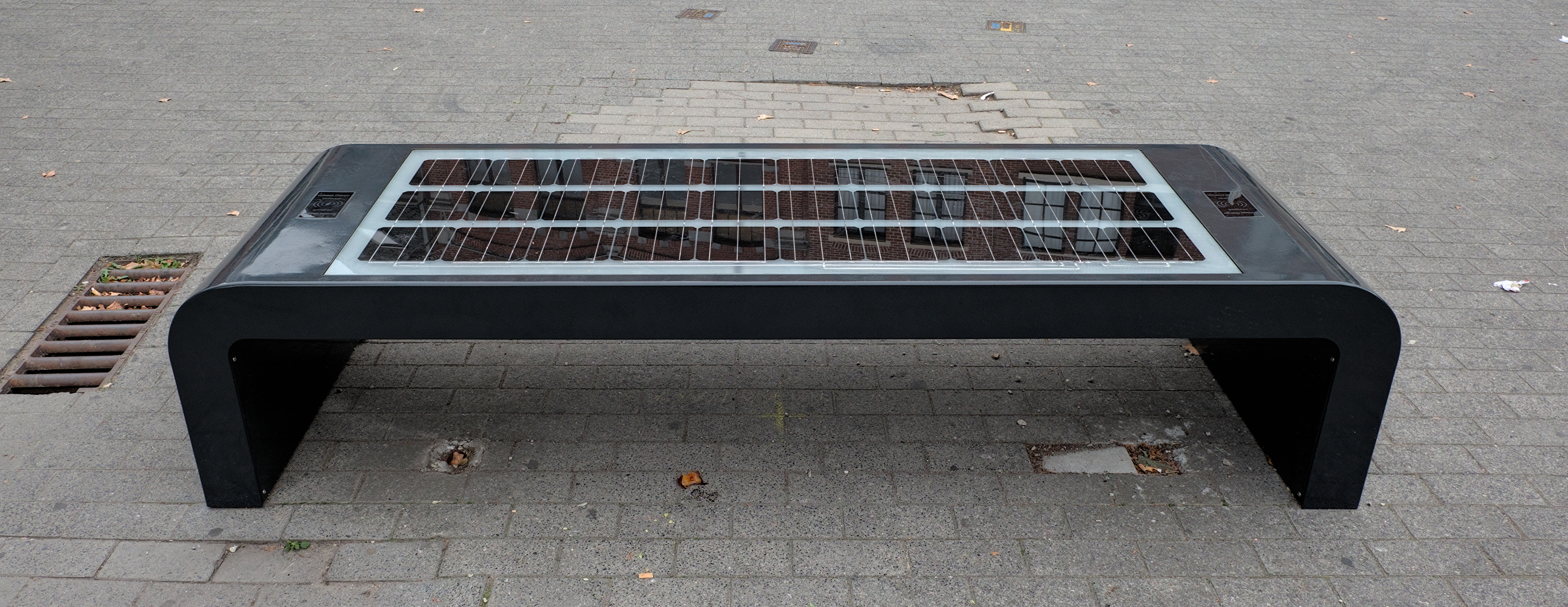
Solar bench in Belgium
