= Petar Gburčik =

Serbian meteorologist (1931–2006)

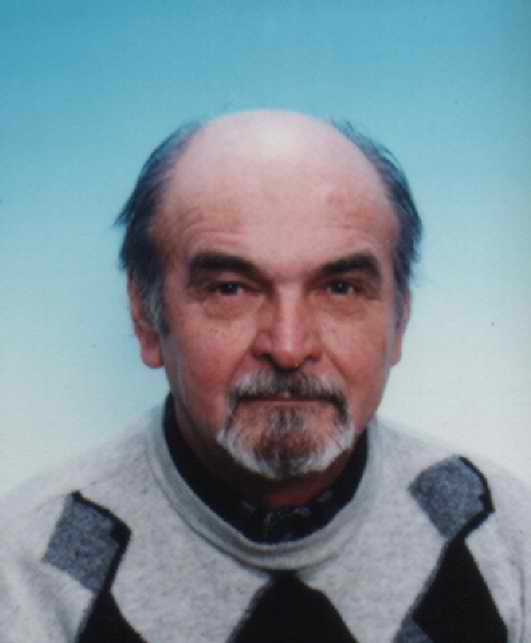
- photograph circa 2004
- Born: 30 October 1931; Sremska Mitrovica, Serbia
- Died: 29 October 2006 (aged 74); Belgrade, Serbia
- Known for: Mathematical models of numerical weather prediction, spatial distribution of air pollution
- Scientific career
- Fields: Meteorology, Atmospheric Physics, Mathematical modelling

Petar Gburčik (Cyrillic: Петар Гбурчик) (30 October 1931 - 29 October 2006) was a Serbian scientist and a professor of meteorology at the University of Belgrade. He was the author of mathematical models of numerical weather prediction, which were used operationally in the Weather Service of Yugoslavia from 1970 to 1977. In the same period he began modelling the atmospheric diffusion of air pollution and created the first model of the spatial distribution of air pollution. The output of this model was used for the elaboration of the urban plan of Pančevo. For the actual research of the three-dimensional distribution of wind energy (on the territories of Belgrade and Serbia) he applied the integration of classic models with GIS technology.

A special area of his research was intentionally and inadvertently modified climates and their impact on sustainable development. These modifications destabilize the climate system and lead to natural and social damage, due to the lack of possibility of weather control. Gburčik proved this with his scientific papers on weather modifications and climate change.
