= ATLAS-TIM AT 32 =

Serbian inventions

ATLAS AT 32
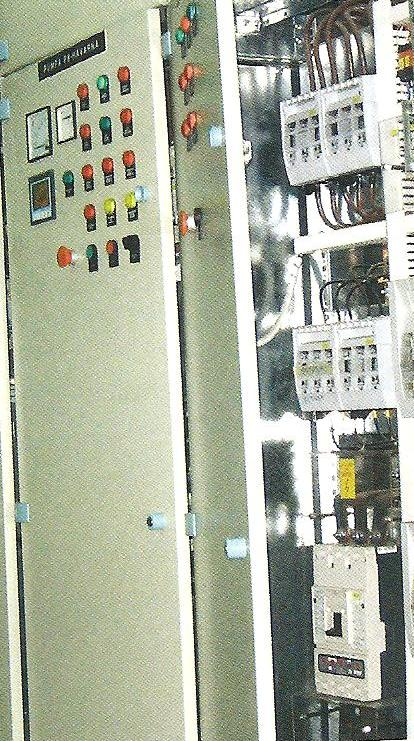
- ATLAS AT 32 Process computer at Mihailo Pupin Institute
- Developer: Mihajlo Pupin Institute
- Type: Process Computer
- Released: 1987; 39 years ago
- Operating system: SCADA VIEW 6000; SCADA VIEW2
- CPU: Intel 386 & Intel 486 compatible
- Memory: 256 to 512 MB RAM
- Storage: 3.5-inch floppy drive
- Display: CRT monitor

The ATLAS-TIM AT 32 was the process computer developed by Mihajlo Pupin Institute in Belgrade in the 1980s. The designers were Dr Vukasin Masnikosa, Dr Bozidar Levi, Mr Milenko Nikolic and their associates. Professor Bozidar Levi with 2 coauthors got the Nikola Tesla award for his ATLAS design in 1988.

The SCADA (Supervisory, Control And Data Acquisition) software systems, such as SCADA VIEW 6000 and SCADA VIEW2, were used in many Serbian Hydro and Termal Power plants. The SCADA hardware developed and manufactured in the M. Pupin Institute includes ATLAS AT 32 (with Intel 386 microprocessors and VLSI circuitry), ATLAS MAX PLC (Intel 486), ATLAS MTU, Programmable controllers TIMKO), Atlas-2000, ATLAS XP, ATLAS-NANO, pico-ATLAS modular RTU devices etc.
