= Graph energy =

In mathematics, the energy of a graph is the sum of the absolute values of the eigenvalues of the adjacency matrix of the graph. This quantity is studied in the context of spectral graph theory.

More precisely, let G be a graph with n vertices. It is assumed that G is a simple graph, that is, it does not contain loops or parallel edges. Let A be the adjacency matrix of G and let $\lambda_i$, $i = 1 , \ldots , n$, be the eigenvalues of A. Then the energy of the graph is defined as:

$$E(G) = \sum_{i=1}^n|\lambda_i|.$$
