= Kosta Milovanović =

Serbian general

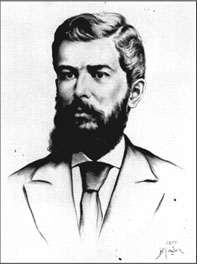
- Born: June 8, 1847
- Died: May 6, 1905 (aged 57)
- Occupations: General Officer, Professor at the Military Academy in Belgrade, designer of the rifle called "mauser-kokinka"

Kostantin "Kosta" Milovanović or Koka Milovanović (Serbian Cyrillic: Коkа Миловановић; Belgrade, 8 June 1847 – Belgrade, 6 May 1905) was a Serbian general, professor at the Military Academy in Belgrade and designer of the rifle called "mauser-kokinka", lauded as one of the best rifles in the world at the end of 19th century.

== Biography ==
Koka Milovanović was the first military envoy of the Principality of Serbia in Austria-Hungary from 1878 to 1880. During that period Milovanović completely modified the antiquated mauser rifle and impressed upon his government to manufacture it in appreciable quantity. He was appointed too late as chief of staff in the unpopular Battle of Slivnitsa on 22 November 1885 against the Bulgarians Milovanović was elected a corresponding member of the Serbian Academic Society on 30 January 1885, but in June he declared in writing that he would not accept the election.
