= Strawberry Tree (solar energy device) =

Solar energy device

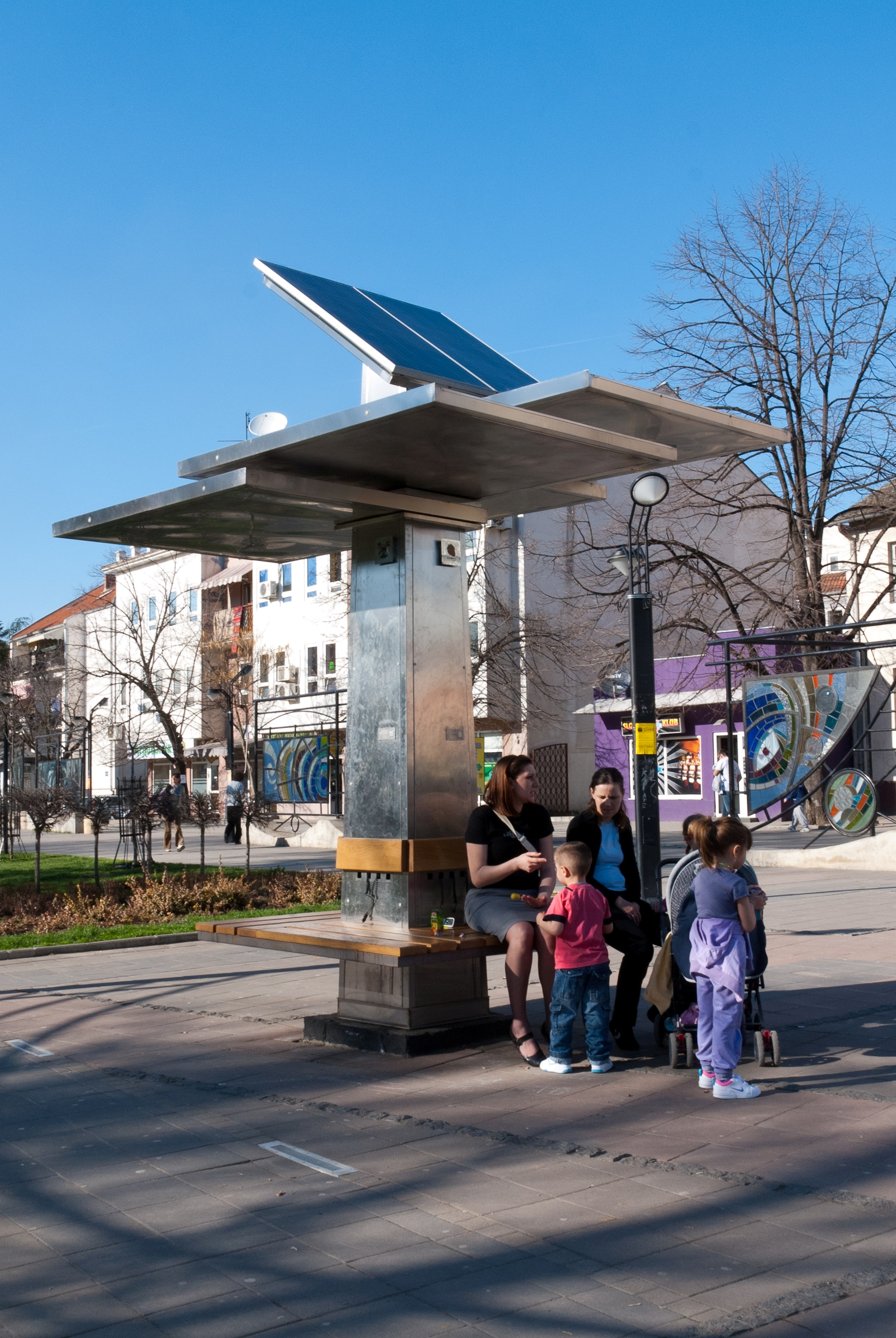
Public solar charger Strawberry Tree installed in Obrenovac, Serbia in October, 2010.

The Strawberry Tree is the world’s first public solar charger for mobile devices. It was developed by Serbian company Strawberry Energy. It won first place in the European Commission’s "Sustainable energy week 2011" competition in Brussels, in the category Consuming.

== Functionalities ==
Strawberry Tree is a solar and WiFi station which is permanently installed in public places such as streets, parks and squares, providing passersby with the opportunity to charge their mobile devices for free when they are outside. Its main parts are:

- Solar panels that transform solar energy to electrical energy
- Rechargeable batteries which accumulate energy and make Strawberry Tree function for more than 14 days without sunshine
- Sixteen cords for different types of mobile devices such as mobile phones, cameras, mp3 players etc.
- Smart electronics which enables balance between produced and consumed energy

Also, Strawberry Tree provides free wireless internet in the immediate surroundings.

== History ==
The first idea of a public solar charger for mobile devices, Strawberry tree was developed by Miloš Milisavljević, founder of Strawberry Energy company.

As of 2013, there were eleven Strawberry Trees installed. The first Strawberry Tree was installed in October, 2010 in the main square of Obrenovac municipality, Serbia. During the first 40 days from presentation of the solar charger, 10,000 chargings were measured. One year later, in cooperation with Telekom Serbia Company, a second Public solar charger for mobile devices was set up in Zvezdara municipality, Belgrade, Serbia. In the same month, a third Strawberry Tree was set in Novi Sad, Serbia. By the beginning of 2012, more than 100,000 chargings had been achieved on all three Strawberry trees.

In cooperation with Telekom Serbia Company, Strawberry energy also installed Strawberry Tree at these locations:

- Kikinda, Serbia, in July, 2012.
- Vranje, Serbia, in August, 2012.
- Bor, Serbia, in October, 2012.
- Valjevo, Serbia, in October, 2012.

In cooperation with city of Belgrade and Palilula municipality, Strawberry energy installed Strawberry Tree Black in Belgrade in Tašmajdan Park, in November 2012, with a completely new design by Serbian architect Miloš Milivojević.

In the beginning of 2013, Strawberry energy, in cooperation with the city of Belgrade and Mikser organization, set up Public solar charger Strawberry Tree Flow with the new design by Serbian designers Tamara Švonja and Vojin Stojadinović, in Slavija square, Belgrade, Serbia.

Later in 2013, through the project "Bijeljina and Bogatić – together on the way towards energy sustainability through increasing energy efficiency and promotion of renewable energy sources" within Cross Border Cooperation Programme Serbia – Bosnia and Herzegovina, two solar chargers have been installed in Bijeljina: in front of Cultural center and in the City park.
