= Vladimir Vukićević =

Serbian computer scientist (born 1979)

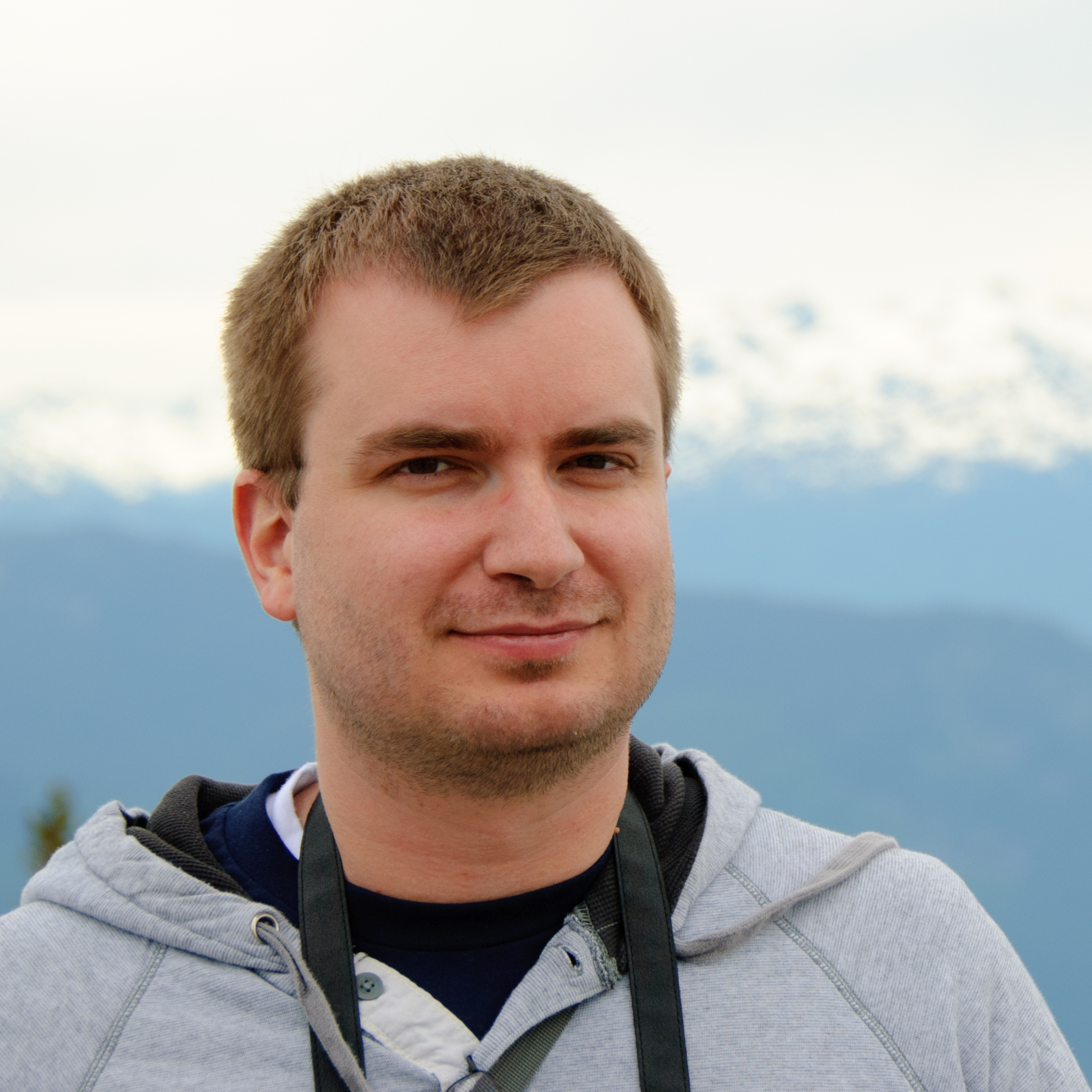
- Vukićević at the 2010 Mozilla Summit in Whistler, British Columbia, Canada
- Born: 29 April 1979 (age 47)
- Occupation: Computer Science
- Known for: Major technological contributions to the Mozilla Firefox web browser, WebGL

Vladimir Vukićević (born 29 April 1979), is a Serbian-born American software engineer who has worked on many open source projects. He is known mostly for his work on open-source graphics libraries, including those used in the Mozilla project, and for being the creator of WebGL.

== Career ==
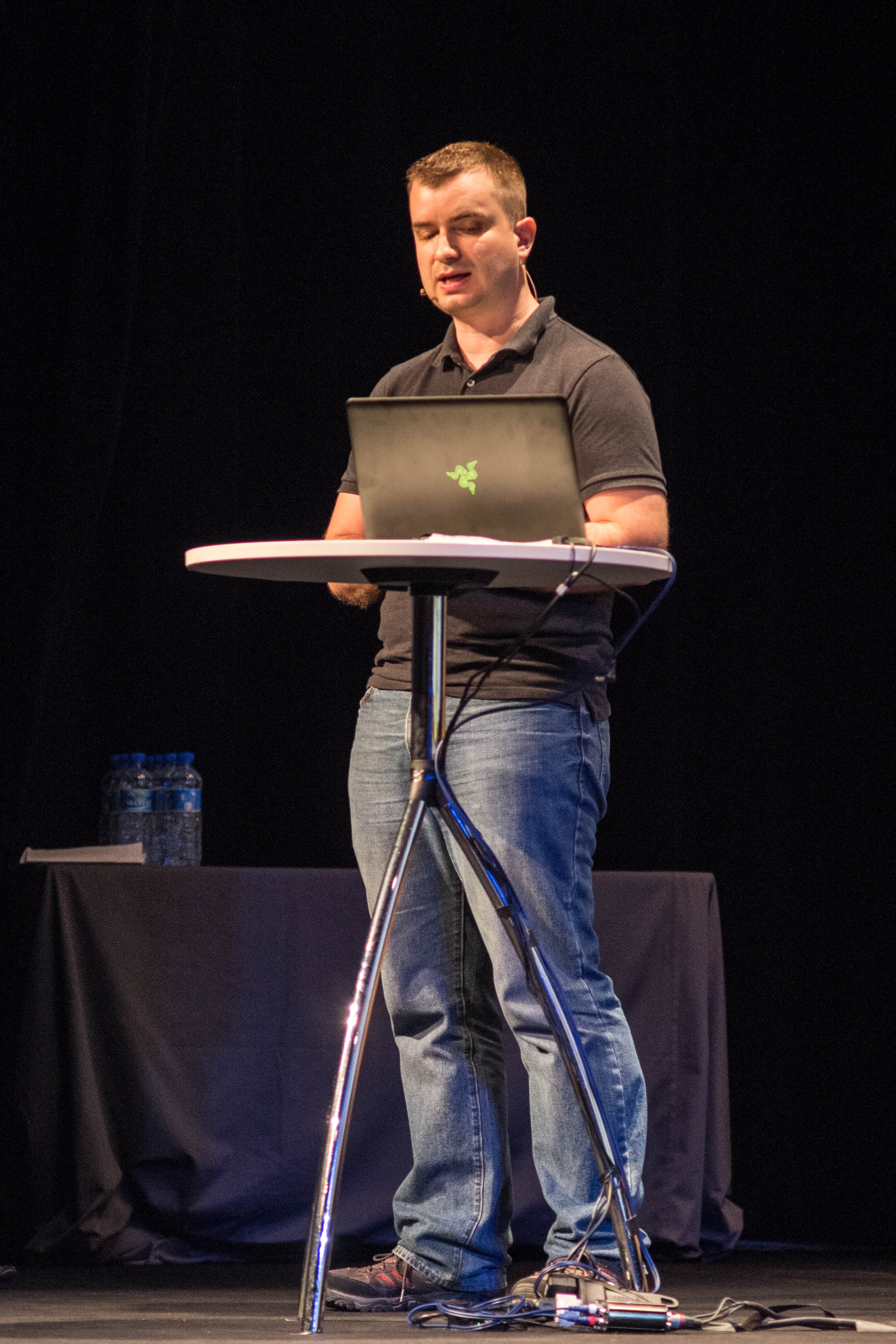
Vukićević at the 2013 Mozilla Summit

In 2006, Vukićević began work on a prototype OpenGL 3D context for the canvas HTML element, which he called Canvas 3D. This work led to the creation of a "Accelerated 3D on the Web" working group within the Khronos Group in order to create a royalty-free standard API for OpenGL and OpenGL ES 2.0 capabilities, which produced the WebGL specification.

In 2008, Vukićević publicly criticized Apple for using private interfaces in the Safari web browser to improve its performance, leaving third-party applications such as Firefox without solutions for similar performance problems.

Vukićević made many important contributions to Firefox Mobile/Fennec, including an ARM backend for the TraceMonkey JavaScript engine and the initial port of Fennec to Android.

Vukićević also co-authored (with Stuart Parmenter) the APNG specification in 2004.

Vukićević served as the chair of the Khronos WebGL Working Group, and has worked as Director of Engineering for Mozilla until 2017 where he created a prototype OpenGL 3D context in Canvas which became WebGL.

He now works as Senior Software Engineer for Emerging Technologies at Unity Technologies. In 2019, he was the company's team leader on Project Tiny, a technology to create light-weight games for the mobile industry based on WebGL and WebAssembly.
