= Migma =

Proposed fusion reactor

Migma, sometimes migmatron or migmacell, was a proposed colliding beam fusion reactor designed by Bogdan Maglich in 1969. Migma uses self-intersecting beams of ions from small particle accelerators to force the ions to fuse. As most such potential collisions will not result in fusion, a key aspect of the migma design was to bend ion paths into circles so they would have many changes to collide. Similar systems using larger collections of particles instead of single ions, up to microscopic dust sized, were referred to as "macrons". Migma was an area of some research in the 1970s and early 1980s, but lack of funding precluded further development.

== Conventional fusion ==
Fusion takes place when atoms come into close proximity and the nuclear strong force pulls their nuclei together. Counteracting this process is the fact that the nuclei are all positively charged, and thus repel each other due to the electrostatic force. In order for fusion to occur, the nuclei must have enough energy to overcome this coulomb barrier. The barrier is lowered for atoms with less positive charge, those with the fewest protons, and the strong force is increased with additional nucleons, the total number of protons and neutrons. This means that a combination of deuterium and tritium has the lowest coulomb barrier, at about 100 keV (see requirements for fusion).

When the fuel is heated to high energies the electrons disassociate from the nuclei, which are left as ions in a gas-like plasma. Any particles in a gas are distributed across a wide range of energies in a spectrum known as the Maxwell–Boltzmann distribution. At any given temperature the majority of the particles are at lower energies, with a "long tail" containing smaller numbers of particles at much higher energies. So while 100 keV represents a temperature of over one billion degrees, in order to produce fusion events the fuel does not have to be heated to this temperature as a whole. Even at a much lower temperature, the rate of fusion among the long tail members may be high enough to provide useful power output as long as it is confined for some period of time so they have a chance to meet. Increased density also increases the rate, as the energy from the reactions will heat the surrounding fuel and potentially incite fusion in it as well. The combination of temperature, density and confinement time is known as the Lawson criterion.

Two primary approaches have developed to attack the fusion energy problem. In the inertial confinement approach the fuel is quickly squeezed to extremely high densities, increasing the internal temperature in the process. There is no attempt to maintain these conditions for any period of time, the fuel explodes outward as soon as the force is released. The confinement time is on the order of nanoseconds, so the temperatures and density have to be very high in order for any appreciable amount of the fuel to undergo fusion. This approach has been successful in producing fusion reactions, but to date the devices that can provide the compression, typically lasers, require more energy than the reactions produce.

In the more widely studied magnetic confinement approach, the plasma, which is electrically charged, is confined with magnetic fields. The fuel is slowly heated until some of the fuel in the tail of the temperature distribution starts undergoing fusion. At the temperatures and densities that are possible using magnets the fusion process is fairly slow, so this approach requires long confinement times on the order of tens of seconds, or even minutes. Confining a gas at millions of degrees for this sort of time scale has proven difficult, although modern experimental machines are approaching the conditions needed for net power production.

== Migma fusion ==
The colliding beam approach avoided the problem of heating the mass of fuel to these temperatures by accelerating the ions directly in a particle accelerator.

The simple way to make such a system is to take two accelerators and aim them at each other. However, the chance that two ions will collide is infinitesimal; most of the ions would fly by each other and the energy put into them would be lost. In order to make such a system practical in energy terms, the particles need to be recirculated so they have many chances to collide. One way to do this is to use a storage ring, but those ions that come close to a reaction scatter out at high angles that make them exit the rings. Simple mathematics showed this approach would not work; the loss rate from these near misses would always be much higher than the energy gained from fusion reactions.

Maglich's concept modified the arrangement based on a new particle storage concept he had co-invented, known as the "precetron". In a typical storage ring concept, the particles are fired into the ring "end on" with a specific energy so they follow the path of the ring. In contrast, in the precetron the storage area is a magnetic mirror. In most magnetic mirror arrangements the average particle energy is relatively low and the ions and electrons have relatively small orbits around the magnetic lines of force, much smaller in radius than the diameter of the mirror as a whole. In the precetron, the ions have much higher energies, and thus much larger orbits, taking up a significant portion of the mirror's diameter, about 1/3 to 1/2. In this arrangement, the ions will tend to move towards the center of the mirror volume, instead of reflecting back and forth between the ends as in the classical mirror setup.

Additionally, due to the arrangement of the fields, with the field being stronger at the outside of the volume, the ion orbits will precess around the inner area. This causes the circular path to move its center of rotation. For instance, if the particle is initially fired into the storage area so that it is orbiting around the bottom half of the mirror area, it will slowly move so the orbit is on one side, then the top, the other side, and then the bottom again. If one traces out the path of a single ion over time, it forms a pattern similar to that of a Spirograph, creating a series of circles that fill the volume.

The key to using this concept in the migma system was to fire the ions into the chamber with the right energy so that their paths passed through the geometric center of the mirror. After a short time, this orbit would precess away from the initial entry point. When another ion is fired in, it takes up the original orbit. Over time, the chamber would fill with ions orbiting within what was effectively an infinite number of storage rings all intersecting in the center. And because they met in the center, ions on opposite sides of the chamber were moving in opposite directions when they met, so a single accelerator produced an effect similar to two accelerators in the conventional layout.

A great advantage of this approach is that forward scattering of the ions in "missed" reactions would simply move them to a different orbit, but their natural movement in the mirror field would rapidly bring them back to the center. It was only those ions that scattered to a large off-axis angle that would escape. As a result, it was expected that any given ion would take about 10^{8} orbits through the reaction area before scattering out of the system. The term "migma", from the Greek word for "mixture", was chosen to distinguish this mass of orbiting ions from the plasma in conventional machines.

== Reactors ==
A series of four Migma reactors were built; the original Migma (retroactively, Migma I) in 1973, Migma II in 1975, Migma III in 1976, and eventually culminating with the Migma IV in 1982. These devices were relatively small, only a few meters long along the accelerator beamline with a disk-shaped target chamber about 2 metres (6 ft 7 in) in diameter and 1 metre (3 ft 3 in) thick. Migma testbed devices used accelerators of about 1 MeV, to 2 MeV.

The Migma designs aimed at using aneutronic fuels, most notably D-He3 reaction, which requires much higher temperatures to reach ignition than the typical D-T reaction. Migma II managed to reach the required temperature, about 15 billion degrees, in 1975. Migma IV set a record for confinement time of 25 seconds in 1982, as well as the record fusion triple product (density × energy-confinement-time × mean energy) of 4 × 10^{14} keV sec cm^{−3}, a record that was not approached by a conventional tokamak until JET achieved 3 × 10^{14} keV sec cm^{−3} in 1987.

To make a Migma large enough to produce net energy, the triple product reached by Migma IV would have to be increased between 100 and 1000 times. Maglich attempted to secure funding for a follow-on design for some time, unsuccessfully. According to an article in The Scientist, Maglich had been involved in an acrimonious debate with the various funding agencies since the 1980s.

== Problems ==
When the Migma design was first being considered, it was modelled using particle accelerator techniques. There was no deep consideration of the beta of the design, the ratio of the magnetic field to the plasma pressure. In conventional designs, like the traditional mirror, beta is a key performance figure that indicates how powerful the magnets would need to be for any given amount of fuel inside the reactor. The cost of the magnets scales with the power, so this gives a rough estimate of the economics of the reactor. In Migma, there is no plasma in the conventional sense, so it was not clear that this consideration applied - as long as one matched the field to the energy of the ions so they remained confined, the technical needs were met.

But the continual feeding of ions leads to an obvious problem, the reaction chamber would become increasingly positively charged. This produced an outward pressure that was similar to the pressure from a conventional plasma caused by the ideal gas law. Eventually, this pressure would overwhelm the magnetic field, regardless of the energy of the particles. To stay below this limit, the density of the particles had to be very low, about 1/1000 that of a typical mirror design.

One could offset this effect by injecting electrons as well as ions, so that the macroscopic volume is neutralized. However, this leads to two new effects that cause energy to be lost from the reactor. One is that the electrons will randomly impact the ions, causing them to neutralize, meaning they are no longer subject to the magnetic field and free to leave the reaction chamber. Even when such neutralization did not occur, the impacts between the electrons and ions would cause the electrons to release energy through both bremsstrahlung and synchrotron radiation.

At some critical electron density, these losses will be greater than the amount of energy fed into the system by the accelerators. To address this, the designs intended to operate with very low electron counts, on the order of one electron for every 100 ions. This leads to a significant limitation on the possible operating parameters of the design; if the electron counts are low the density of the fuel must be low to avoid the positive charge overwhelming the magnets, but if the electron density is increased to allow higher fuel density, the losses begin to increase through electron effects.

In order to improve this figure, it was suggested that a second accelerator fire electrons into the chamber as well; if electrons met ions they would neutralize, and as such, they would no longer be subject to the magnetic fields and leave the chamber. The key to making this work would be to send the electrons into the center, where the slower ions that were no longer useful were massing. Free electrons were also to be scavenged by devices in the reactor chamber.

In the late 1990s, a generalized consideration of these issues suggested that the Migma was not alone in this problem; when one considers bremsstrahlung in non-thermalized fuels, it appears that no system running on aneutronic fuels can approach ignition, that any system using non-thermalized fuels (including Migma) appear to be able to cover their losses. The only approach that appears to have a theoretical possibility of working is the D-T or perhaps D-D reaction in a thermalized plasma mass.

In reply to this, the problem of space charge neutralization by electrons was addressed in Maglich's primary work, in the article TIME AVERAGE NEUTRALIZED MIGMA: A COLLIDING BEAM/PLASMA HYBRID PHYSICAL STATE AS ANEUTRONIC ENERGY SOURCE - A REVIEW. In this article Maglich details his discovery of transverse electron oscillation and control by biased plates. While this provided neutralization up to his highest achieved density, the density was then limited by injected current, and trapping efficiency, which were both low. This technique, discussed in "Section 10. How the space charge limit was exceeded", of the above named article, covers the theory and experimental of a novel method for space charge neutralization. What possibilities it holds for future progress in this field should perhaps not be disregarded out of hand.

Other more recent studies have been published by Arvind Jain and another by the same author. Additionally there is a newly incorporated company called 21st Century Fusion, Inc. that has patents US7,825,601 and US7,405,410 for a new type of accelerator that incorporates the Migma axis crossing orbits.
