= Slobodan Ćuk =

Electrical engineer

- Pronunciation: Chook
- Education: California Institute of Technology (Caltech)
- Known for: Ćuk converter
- Awards: See below

Slobodan Ćuk (Serbo-Croatian pronunciation: [tʃuk]) is a Serbian-American author, inventor, business owner, electrical engineer, and professor of electrical engineering at the California Institute of Technology (Caltech). The Ćuk switched-mode DC-to-DC voltage converter is named after him.

== Biography ==
For over 20 years, he was a full-time Professor of Electrical Engineering at the California Institute of Technology until January 1, 2000.

In 1979, Slobodan founded TESLAco, located in Laguna Niguel, California. It had a charter to apply basic research results developed at Caltech for practical commercial and military designs.

Over 30 patents have Ćuk's name on them.

== Personal life ==
Slobodan's parents are Milojko and Julijana Ćuk. He speaks American English and Serbian. On February 29, 1972, Slobodan immigrated from Belgrade, Yugoslavia to the United States and was sponsored by NASA.

Slobodan received a Dipl.Ing. from University of Belgrade in 1970, a M.S. in Electrical Engineering from Santa Clara University in 1974, and a Ph.D. in Power Electronics from the California Institute of Technology (Caltech) in 1977.

== Bibliography ==
=== Books ===
- Power Electronics, Vol. 5: Power Electronics: A New Beginning; Ćuk Slobodan; announced but not released yet
- Power Electronics, Vol. 4: State-Space Averaging and Ćuk Converters; Ćuk Slobodan; 2016; ISBN 978-1519520289
- Power Electronics, Vol. 3: Advanced Topics and Designs; Ćuk Slobodan; 2015; ISBN 978-1519520296
- Power Electronics, Vol. 2: Modeling, Analysis, and Measurements; Ćuk Slobodan; 2015; ISBN 978-1519513267
- Power Electronics, Vol. 1: Topologies, Magnetics, and Control; Ćuk Slobodan; 2015; ISBN 978-1519161130

=== Books (Coauthor) ===
- Advances in Switched-Mode Power Conversion, Vol. 3:; Ćuk Slobodan and R.D. Middlebrook; 1983; ASIN B000H4NQLY
- Advances in Switched-Mode Power Conversion, Vol. 2: Switched-mode Topologies; Ćuk Slobodan and R.D. Middlebrook; 1981; ASIN B00125WN16
- Advances in Switched-Mode Power Conversion, Vol. 1: Modeling, Analysis, and Measurement; Ćuk Slobodan and R.D. Middlebrook; 1981; ASIN B003XX2EB4

=== Patents ===
- US Patent 7915874, filed in 2010, "Step-down converter having a resonant inductor, a resonant capacitor and a hybrid transformer" (Ćuk-Buck2 converter)
- US Patent 4257087, filed in 1979, "DC-to-DC switching converter with zero input and output current ripple and integrated magnetics circuits" (Ćuk converter)

=== Patents (Coauthor) ===
- US Patent 7778046, filed in 2008, "Voltage step-up switching DC-to-DC converter"
- US Patent 5442539, filed in 1992, "Ćuk DC-to-DC switching converter with input current shaping for unity power factor operation"
- US Patent 4274133, filed in 1979, "DC-to-DC Converter having reduced ripple without need for adjustments" (Ćuk converter)
- US Patent 4184197, filed in 1977, "DC-to-DC switching converter" (Ćuk converter)

=== Papers ===
- Modeling, Analysis, and Design of Switching Converters; PhD thesis at California Institute of Technology; November 1976

=== Papers (Coauthor) ===
- A General Unified Approach to Modelling Switching-Converter Power Stages; IEEE Power Electronics Specialists Conference; June 8, 1976

=== Magazine articles ===
- "Hybrid-Switching Step-down Converter with Hybrid Transformer"; Power Electronics; May 2011 (Ćuk-Buck2 converter)
- "Single-Stage Isolated Bridgeless PFC Converter Achieves 98% Efficiency"; Power Electronics; November 2010

== See also ==
- Ćuk converter
- DC-to-DC converter
- Switched-mode power supply
