= George Randolph Kalbfleisch =

American physicist

George Randolph Kalbfleisch (March 14, 1931 – September 12, 2006) was an American particle physicist.

George Kalbfleisch was born March 14, 1931, in Long Beach, California, to Friedrich Carl and Hildegard Kalbfleisch. He graduated from Phineas Banning High School, Wilmington, California, in 1948. He received his Bachelor of Science degree in chemistry from Loyola University, Los Angeles, California, in 1952. On October 23, 1954, he married Ruth Ann Adams in San Pedro, California. He received his Ph.D. in experimental High Energy Physics in 1961 from the University of California at Berkeley. He worked as a post-doctoral associate at the University of California at Berkeley with Dr. Luis Alvarez, as a staff physicist at Brookhaven National Laboratory on Long Island, New York, for twelve years, and at Fermi National Laboratory (Fermilab) in Batavia, Illinois, for three years. He performed experiments in the systematizing and the discovery of new particles since 1958, using beams of muons, pions, kaons, protons and antiprotons, and neutrinos. He worked with liquid hydrogen bubble chambers until 1972, and subsequently worked with electronic spectrometers. He performed research at CERN Laboratory in Switzerland during a sabbatical in 1972. While at Fermilab, he was in charge of the superconducting quadrupoles for the Tevatron (at that time, the world's highest energy machine), built more than twenty prototype quadrupoles, and developed and provided the production tooling from which more than 200 quadrupoles were made for the Tevatron.

Kalbfleisch came to the University of Oklahoma (OU) in 1979 where he established the OU High Energy Physics group (OU-HEP). He was elected as a Fellow in the American Physical Society in 1982 for his discoveries of the first hyperonic beta decay, of the ninth pseudoscalar meson, the first direct observation of the electron-neutrino in muon decay and direct measurements of the velocities of neutrinos. In 1990, he established a sister High Energy Physics group at Langston University, Langston, Oklahoma. He was a consultant for the Superconducting Super Collider Laboratory in Waxahachie, Texas, until the United States Government canceled that project in 1993. In 1999, Dr. Kalbfleisch retired from teaching at the University of Oklahoma, although he continued conducting research as Professor Emeritus of Physics until a few weeks before his death. In 2001, he was the first physicist inducted into the inaugural Alumni Wall of Fame at Loyola Marymount University, in honor of his lifetime achievements. His research has included the study of "charm quark" and "beauty quark" quantum states at Fermilab and neutrino properties in-house at OU, and was supported by continuing grants from the United States Department of Energy. He finished the search for low mass accelerator produced magnetic monopoles (E-882, 1995) approved by Fermilab and performed at OU. Most recently, he worked on an EDM (electric dipole moment) of the electron experiment at OU, with younger collaborators. He published more than one hundred and ninety articles in elementary particle physics.
