= Ognjeslav Stepanović Kostović =

Serbian inventor (1851-1916)

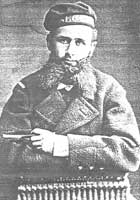
- Born: 1851; Wieselburg, Austrian Empire
- Died: December 16, 1916 (aged 64–65); Saint Petersburg
- Occupation: Inventor

Ognjeslav Stepanović Kostović (Serbian Cyrillic: Огњеслав Степановић Костовић) (1851 – 16 December 1916) was a Serbian inventor. He is credited with creating "arbonite" (i.e. plywood), the first "plastic" materials (e.g. gutta percha) pre-date 1906 plastic in the world.

== Biography ==
He was born in Wieselburg in the Austrian Empire to a Serbian noble family residing in Pest in the Kingdom of Hungary, but spent most of his life in Saint Petersburg in the Russian Empire.

He is credited with creating "arbonite" (i.e. plywood), the first "plastic" materials (e.g. gutta percha) pre-date 1906 plastic in the world. Kostović patented the technology of the production of arbonite in the USA on 4 September 1906. In the early 1880s he designed and attempted to construct a dirigible (airship), about 20 years before Ferdinand von Zeppelin. His flight vehicle was destroyed in a fire and never tested in the air. He also developed and constructed a large gasoline engine for his dirigible. In 1879 he demonstrated his flying models of a helicopter, aircraft and ornithopter, while in 1881 approached the building of an aircraft. In the catalogue of an aeronautical exhibition of 1911 and in the article of G.V. Piotrovski it is said that Kostović actually constructed a flight vehicle. The same was also said in A. Ewald's report in the Russian technical society on 12 March 1883.

Kostović's 1883/1884 petrol engine (with carburettor) preceded and out-performed the Daimler-Benz equivalent.

Ognjeslav Kostović lived with his family in Saint Petersburg, Russia. He celebrated the slava of Saint Nicholas every year, and one of his regular guests was Dmitri Mendeleev.

One of his daughters married a Serbian officer; during the First World War she became, together with Nadežda Petrović, a voluntary nurse. Two of his daughters lived in Belgrade.

When he died in December 1916 in Saint Petersburg, the press reported that "a brilliant inventor and scientist has disappeared, a man who has, for many reasons, deserved that future generations remember his unusual destiny and scientific achievements".

== See also ==
- Plywood
- Zeppelin
