= Serbian Americans =

Americans of Serb descent

Амерички Срби Američki Srbi
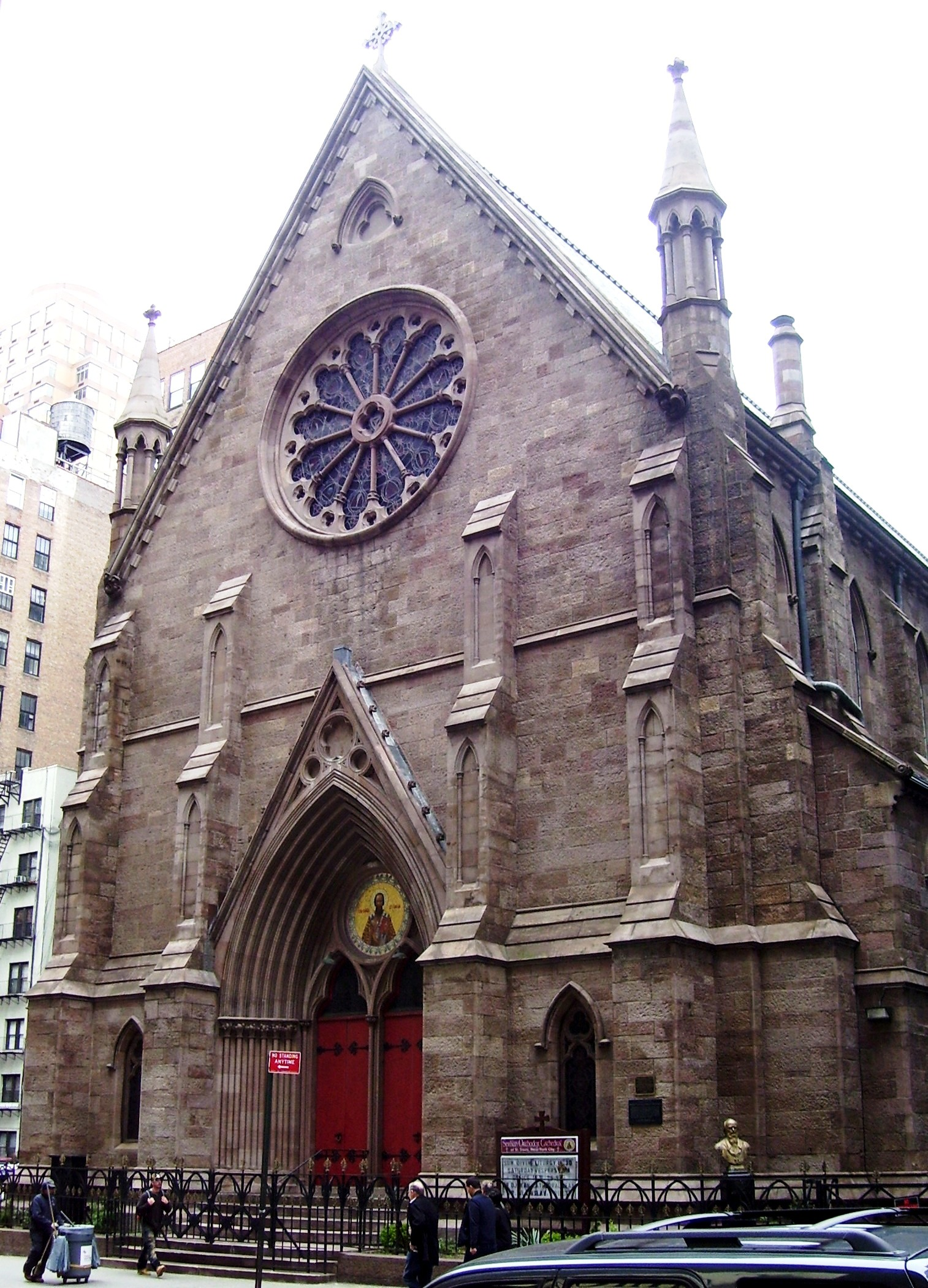
- Saint Sava Serbian Orthodox Church in Manhattan, New York City

Total population
- 169,227 (2025)

Regions with significant populations
- Illinois, California, Pennsylvania, Ohio, Florida, Indiana, New York, Michigan, Wisconsin, Arizona

Languages
- American English and Serbian

Religion
- Predominately Eastern Orthodoxy (Serbian Orthodox Church), minority Protestantism and Catholicism

Related ethnic groups
- Serbian Canadians, Montenegrin Americans, Croatian Americans, Bosnian Americans, Macedonian Americans, Yugoslav Americans

Serbian Americans or American Serbs, (Note: The community is commonly referred to as Serbian Americans in English and more rarely as Serb Americans. In Serbian, the community is known as American Serbs (Амерички Срби, Američki Srbi), and more rarely as Serbs in America (Срби у Америци, Srbi u Americi).) are Americans of ethnic Serb ancestry. As of 2025, there were over 169,000 American citizens who identified as having Serb ancestry, though broader estimates include many of those with Yugoslav ancestry. Serbian Americans represent one of the largest groups within the global Serb diaspora.

== History ==
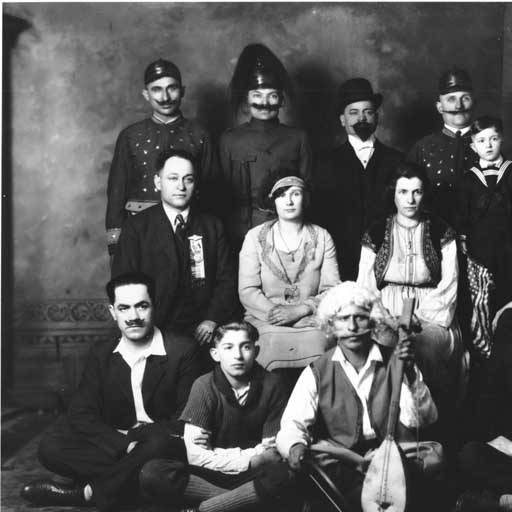
Members of the Serbian Association in Juneau, Alaska in costume for the production of a theatrical play, 1928

One of the first Serb immigrants to the United States was the settler George Fisher, who arrived in Philadelphia in 1815, fought in the Texan Revolution, and became a judge in California. Another notable early Serb in America was Basil Rosevic, who founded a shipping company, the Trans-Oceanic Ship Lines, around the year 1800. In the early 1800s, many Serbs immigrated to New Orleans seeking employment. In 1841, Serbs founded the Greek Orthodox parish with Greek immigrants in New Orleans, further solidifying their presence in the region.

Serb immigrants first came in significant numbers to the United States in the late 19th century from the Lika, Dalmatia, and Bay of Kotor regions. The primary area of settlement for Serbian and Montenegrin Americans in the 19th century was California, particularly the San Francisco Bay Area. Serbs in mid-19th century Sacramento owned saloons, coffee salons, restaurants, and produce markets.

Other Serbs often found employment in mines, and numerous Serb families moved to mining towns in California, mostly in the Sierra Nevada. Amador County, in particular, had a large Serb population in the late 1880s and 1890s due to the California Gold Rush. The Saint Sava Serbian Orthodox Church in Jackson, built in 1894, was the first Serbian Orthodox church in America.

Serbian miners, especially from Montenegro, and their families also settled in great numbers in Alaska, during the Klondike Gold Rush in the late 1890s with the primary areas of settlement being Juneau, Douglas, Fairbanks, and Sitka. By World War I there were two Serbian societies established, one in Juneau and other in Douglas (around Serbian Orthodox Church of Saint Sava) for the preservation of Serbian customs heritage in Alaska. In 1905 a newspaper called "The Serbian Montenegrin" was founded in Douglas. Serbs also made up a large number of the miners at the Treadwell gold mine until its collapse in 1917 and subsequent closure in 1922. In 1910, there was a massive explosion on the 1,100 foot level of the Mexican mine at Treadwell. 39 men were killed, 17 of whom were Serbian.

Serbian-Americans volunteered in the First Balkan War. During World War I, as many as 15,000 Serbian-American volunteers returned to the Balkans to fight for the Allied cause in their homeland, especially from Alaska and California. Serbs in the United States who did not volunteer to fight marched for the creation of Yugoslavia, sent aid to the Balkans through the Red Cross, formed a Serbian Relief Committee, and urged notable Americans to support the Serbian cause. Distinguished Serbian American scientist Mihajlo Pupin, a friend of U.S. President Woodrow Wilson, led the Serbian National Defence, a Serbian-American organization which collected money and attempted to influence American public opinion with regard to the Balkans. During World War I, Pupin's Consulate in New York served as a center of Serbian-American diplomacy and volunteering of Serbian Americans to the Serbian front.

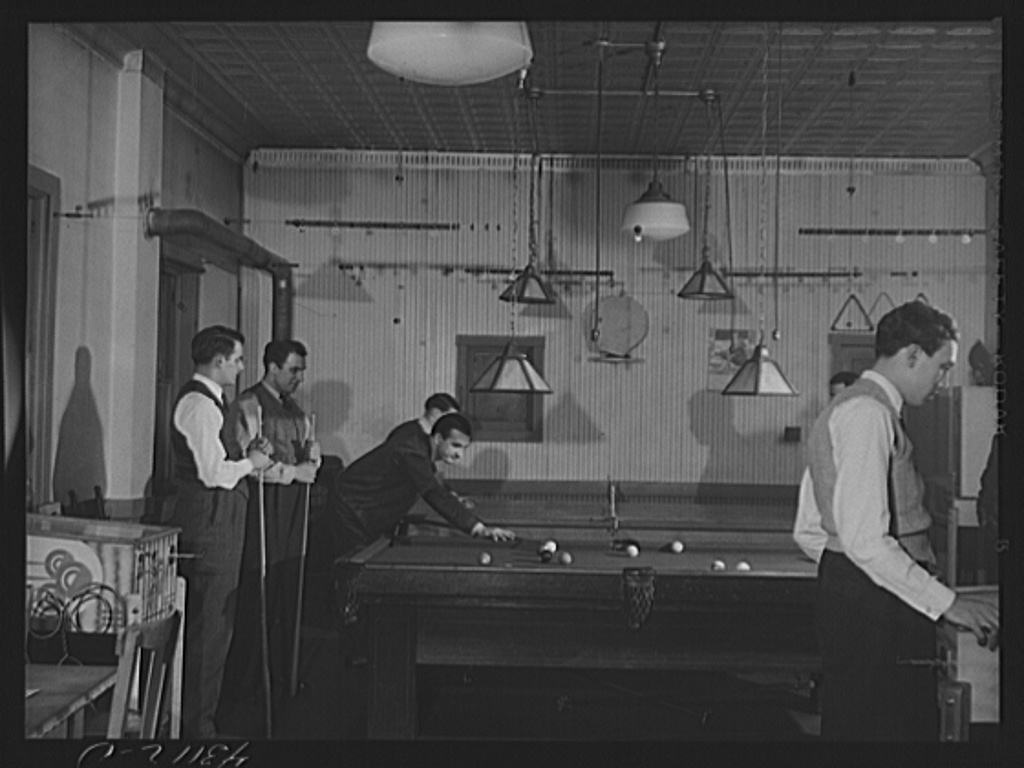
Inside the Serbian Club in Aliquippa, Pennsylvania, 1941

Following World War II, a significant wave of Serb immigration to the United States began, including members of the royalist Chetnik movement, after the country came under the authoritarian rule of Communist leader Josip Broz Tito. These waves primarily settled in industrial midwestern cities like Chicago, Milwaukee, and Pittsburgh, as well as coastal areas such as Los Angeles and New York City, building on earlier Serbian communities. Many Serbian American cultural and religious organizations have been formed at that time.

A select group of seven pioneering Serbian American engineers, affectionately dubbed the "Serbo 7", played pivotal roles in NASA's Apollo program during the 1960s, leveraging their expertise in systems engineering, avionics, and project management to help propel humanity's first lunar landing in 1969. Their contributions spanned critical phases of spacecraft design, testing, and mission coordination, including troubleshooting during the dramatic Apollo 13 crisis.

The 1990s saw another surge due to the Yugoslav Wars, as Serb immigrants escaped ethnic conflicts in Bosnia and Herzegovina and Croatia as well as economic collapse in Serbia. Demographically, the Serbian American population grew steadily during this period; census data shows 100,941 people declaring Serbian descent in 1980, rising to 140,337 by 2000.

== Demographics ==
According to data from the 2023 American Community Survey, 181,469 people stated that they had Serb ancestry (whether alone or in combination with another ancestry), out of which 42,968 were Serbia-born. Serbian Americans comprise 0.05% of total U.S. population. Some 178,286 declared Yugoslav as their ancestry in 2025. Many of those self-reporting as Yugoslavs may be of ethnic Serb origin. The number of Serbia-born people in the United States fell to 36,310 in 2025.

The Serbian American community is concentrated (over one-third of the total) in Great Lakes region, with major hubs in Chicago, Cleveland, and Milwaukee metro areas.

Map of U.S. states by Serbian American population (2025) >20,000 10,000 to 20,000 5,000 to 10,000 1,000 to 5,000 <1,000

Year	Population
1980	100,941
1990	116,975
2000	140,337
2010	187,739
2016	181,607
2018	199,632
2020	193,844
2022	191,538
2023	181,469
2024	176,643
2025	169,227

State		Population (2025)
Flag of Illinois	Illinois	20,065
Flag of California	California	13,628
Flag of Ohio	Ohio	13,003
Flag of Florida	Florida	12,939
Flag of Pennsylvania	Pennsylvania	12,483
Flag of New York (state)	New York	10,074
Flag of Arizona	Arizona	8,512
Flag of Michigan	Michigan	7,761
Flag of Indiana	Indiana	7,663
Flag of Wisconsin	Wisconsin	6,313
Flag of Texas	Texas	5,084

Serbian Americans predominantly belong to the Eastern Orthodoxy with the Serbian Orthodox Church as the traditional church. There are three Serbian Orthodox dioceses (Eastern America, New Gračanica and Midwestern America, and Western America) encompassing 122 parishes across the United States, with 68,800 adherents, of which some 15,400 regularly attended services.

Significant portion of Serbian Americans also adhere to Protestantism or various Christian denominations, as well as Catholicism, while the rest are mainly irreligious.

== Heritage ==
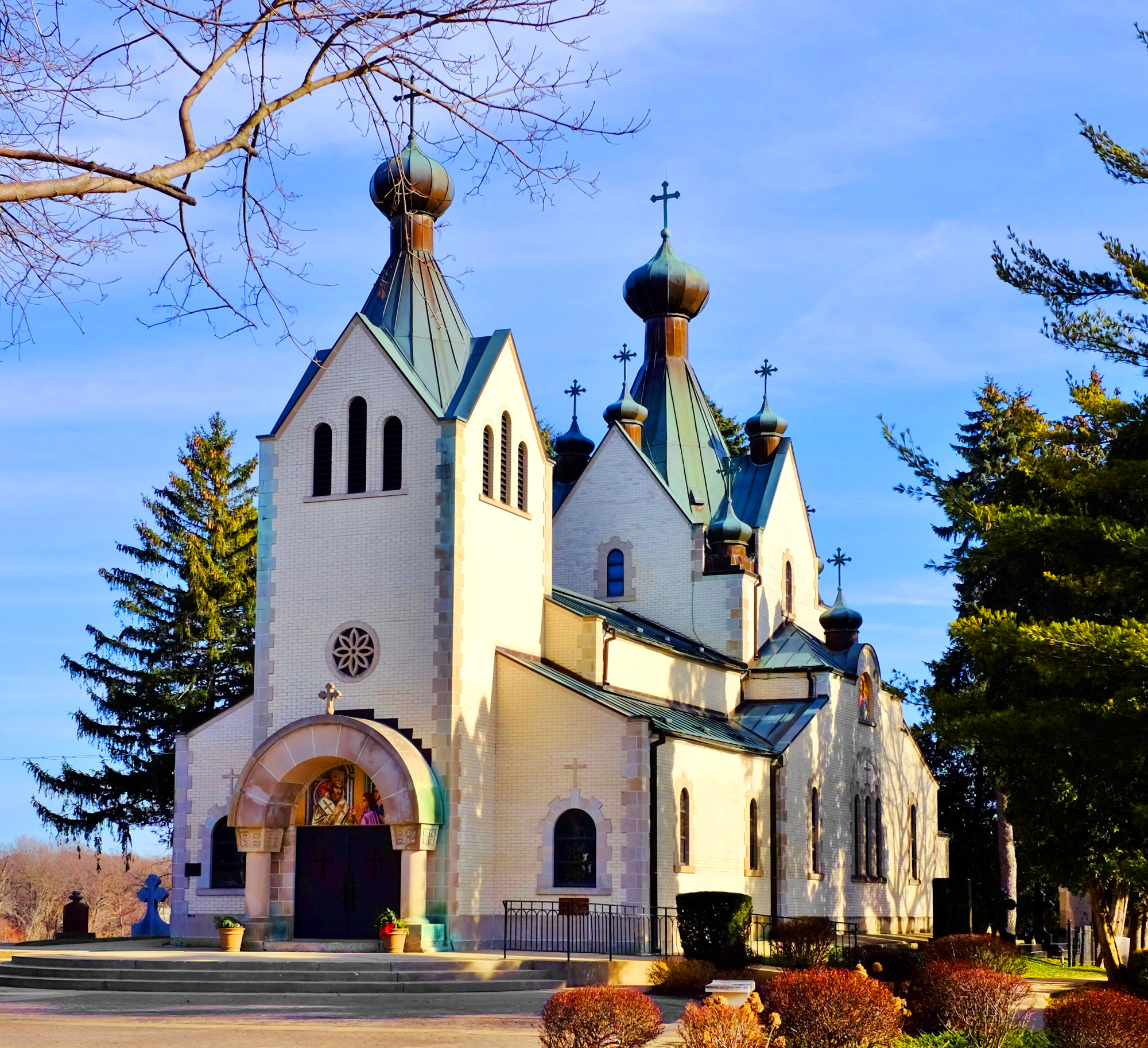
Saint Sava Serbian Orthodox Monastery and Seminary in Libertyville, Illinois

There are 139 Serbian Orthodox churches in 34 states across the country, many of which stand as representations of Serbo-Byzantine architecture that include unique characteristic elements from the Middle Ages. Consecrated in 1894, the Saint Sava Church in Jackson, California, is the oldest Serbian Orthodox church in the United States. The New Gračanica Monastery in Third Lake, Illinois, is an impressive architectural replica of the Serbian Orthodox monastery of Gračanica in Kosovo, the famous church that was continually destroyed and rebuilt in the course of the history.

The United States has at least seven places named Belgrade, making it one of the most duplicated foreign city names in the country. All are tributes to the Serbian capital of Belgrade, largest of which is Belgrade in Montana with population of 12,509 and named after the Serbian capital, as an expression of appreciation to the Serbian investors who helped finance a portion of the Northern Pacific Railway.

== Media ==
Serbian Americans have historically published and continue to publish a number of newspapers in both the Serbian and English languages. The oldest Serbian American newspaper currently in publication is the Pittsburgh-based bilingual American Srbobran, which has been in circulation since 1906.

There are Serbian-language radio programs available in the United States, not as full-time dedicated FM/AM stations but as brokered-time shows on multilingual outlets, most prominent of which is Serbian Radio Chicago, a daily one-hour program on WNWI Chicago-area radio station.

Serbian Television USA is a Chicago-based media production company focused on producing content that promotes Serbian culture, values, language, and customs while covering Serbian-American community events. Its flagship show, Serb View, airs weekly on Xfinity cable channel 19 in the Chicago area.

== Organizations ==
The Serbian American community has developed a rich network of organizations focused on cultural preservation, mutual aid, religious life, political advocacy, and humanitarian efforts.

The Serbian American organization Serbian National Defense Council, founded in 1914, is a Serb diaspora community organization whose goal is promoting interest of Serbs and Serbia abroad as well as the interests of the Serbian Orthodox Church. It is based in Chicago, and also has chapters in Hamilton (Canada) and Sydney (Australia).

The Serb National Federation is the oldest Serbian American community organization, founded 1901. It publishes American Srbobran newspaper.

== Notable people ==
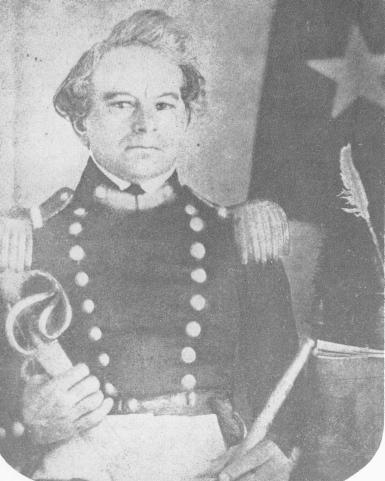
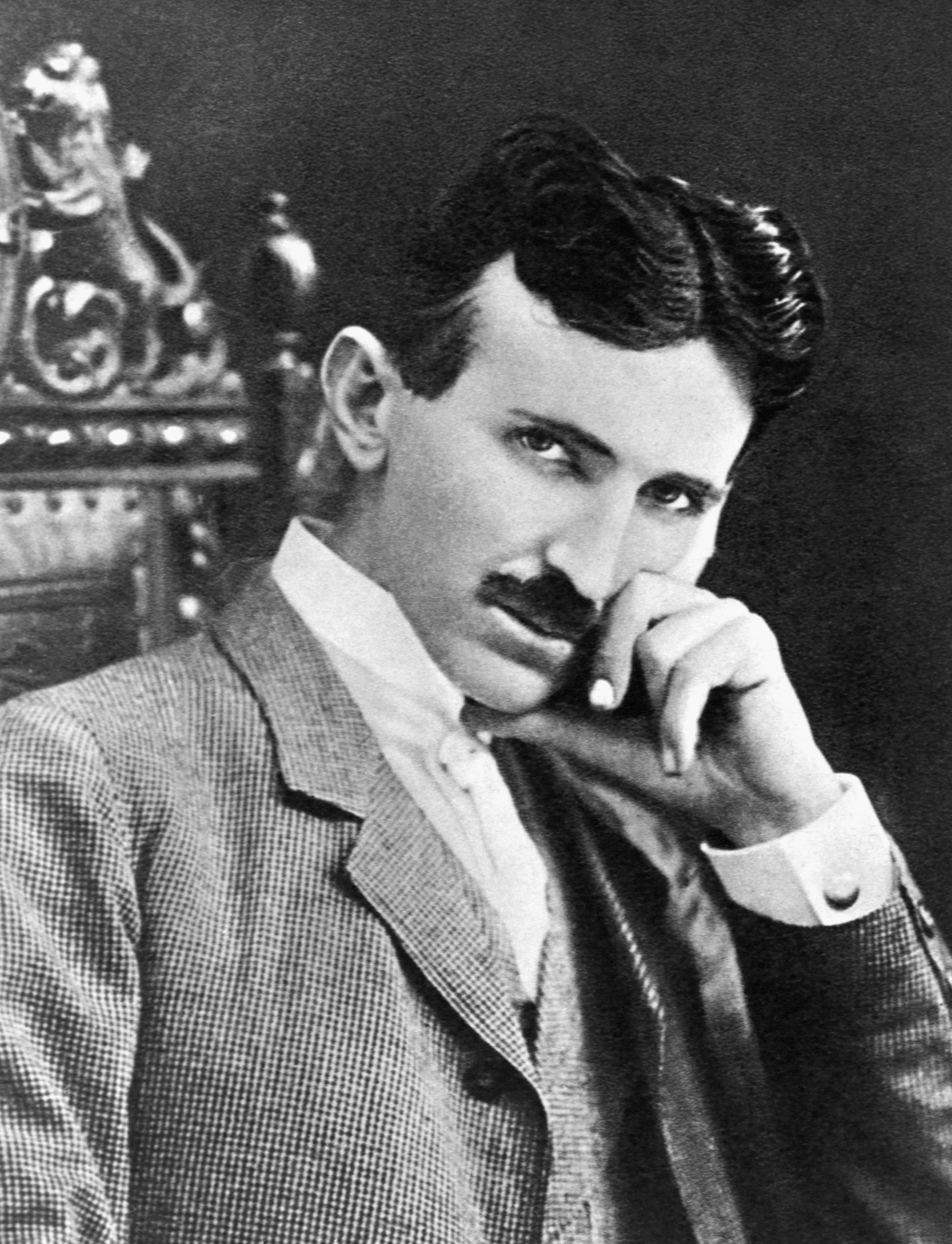
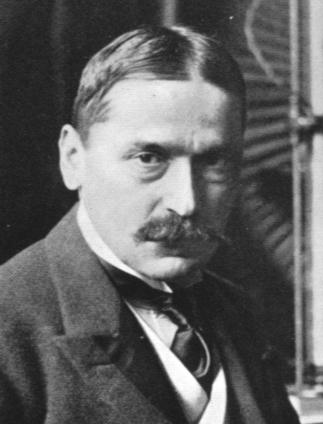
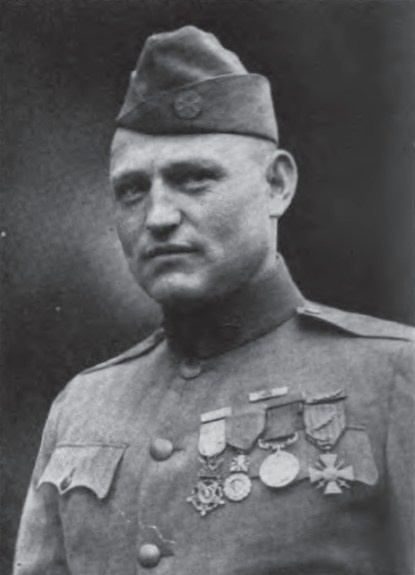
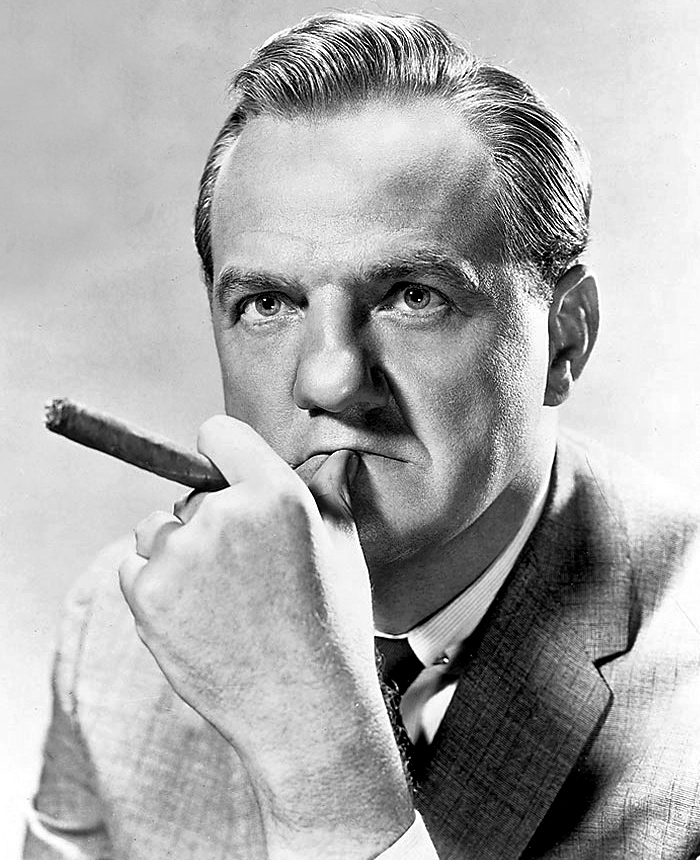
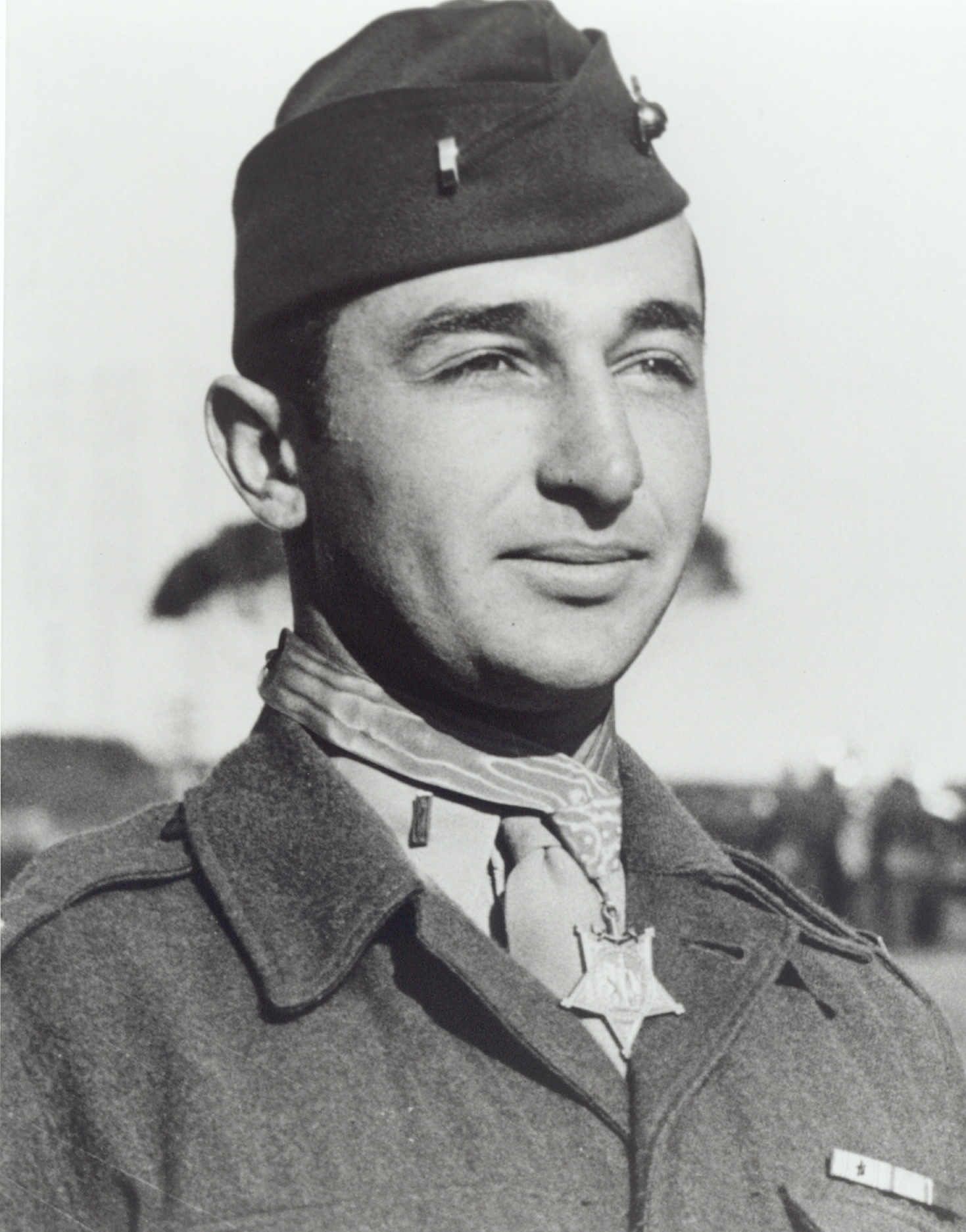
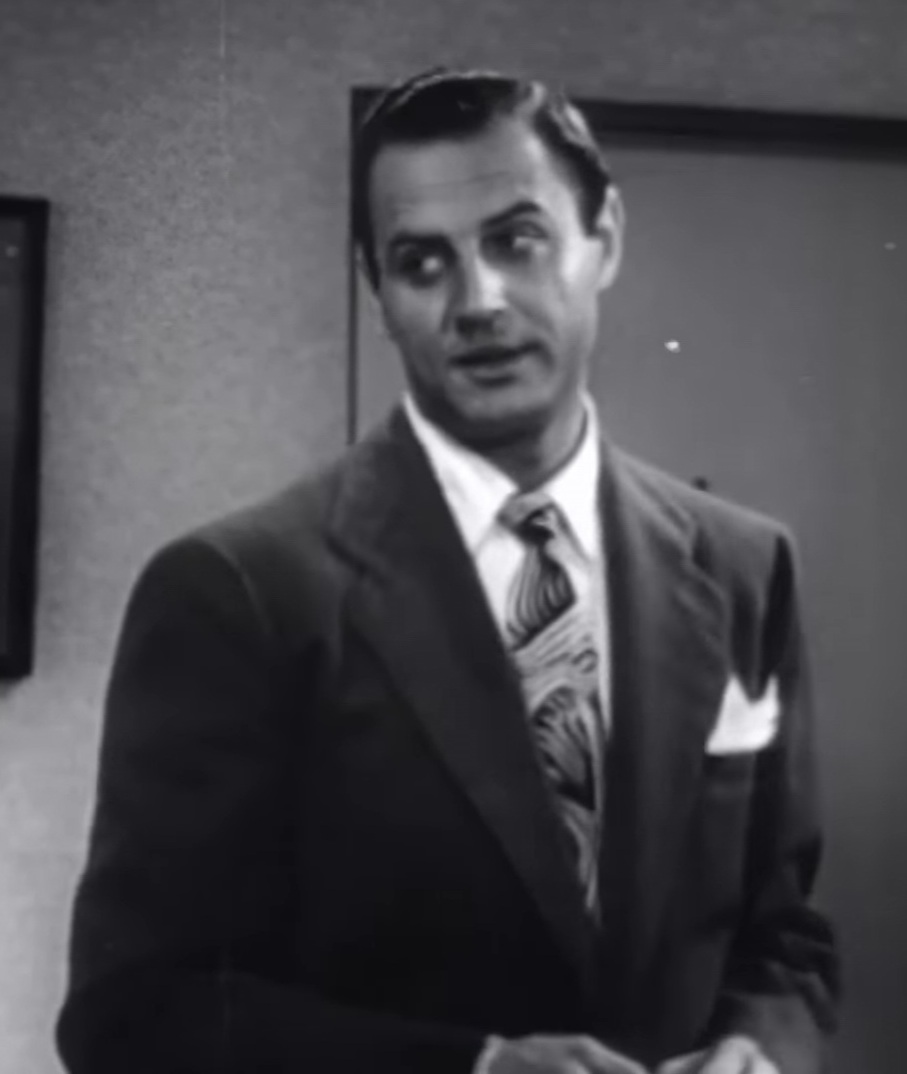
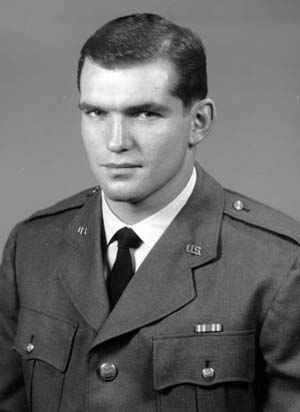
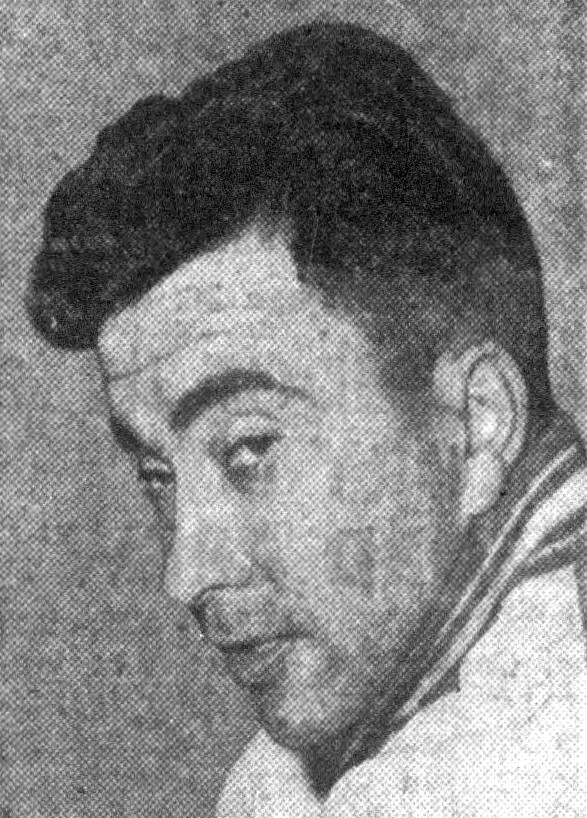
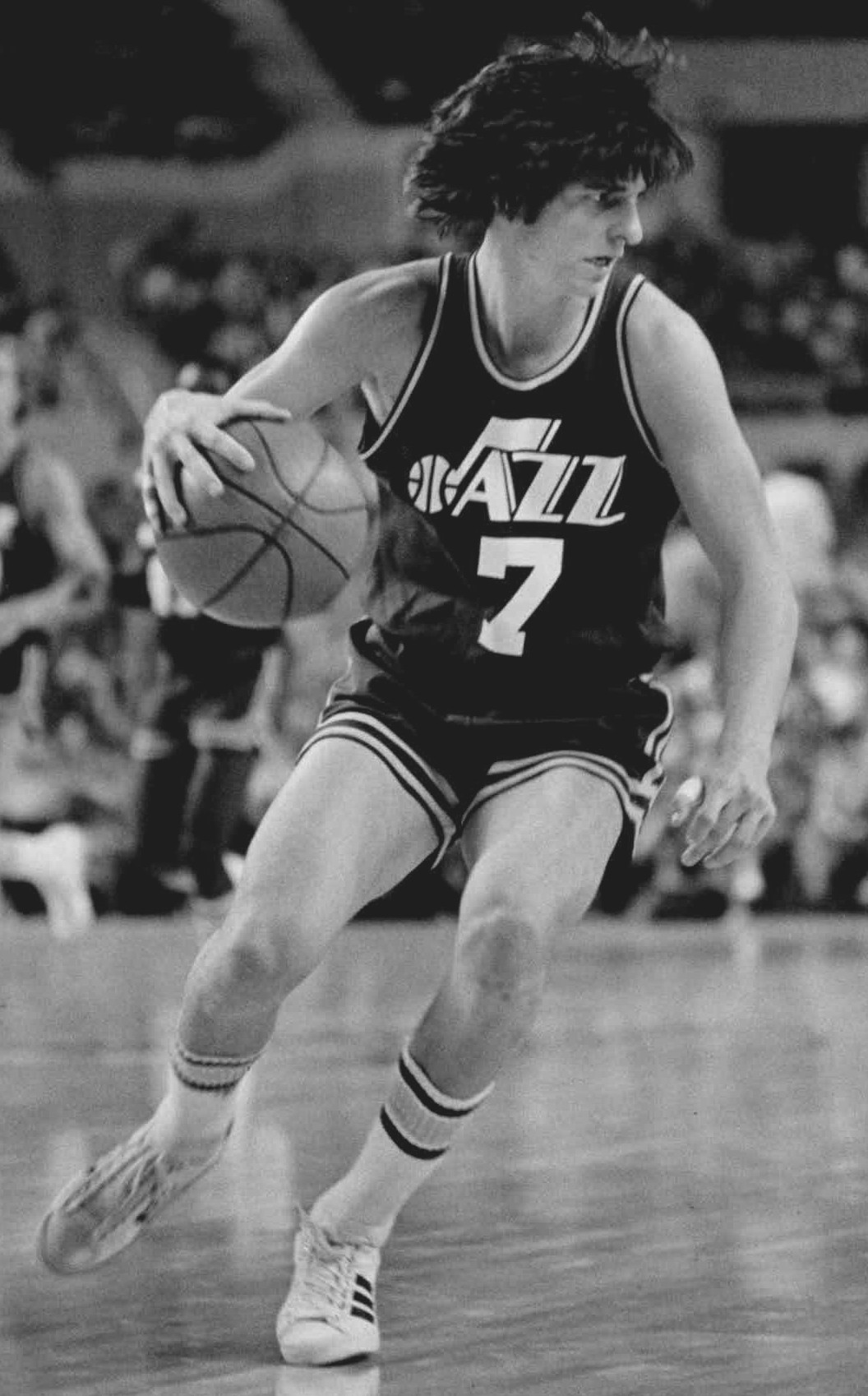
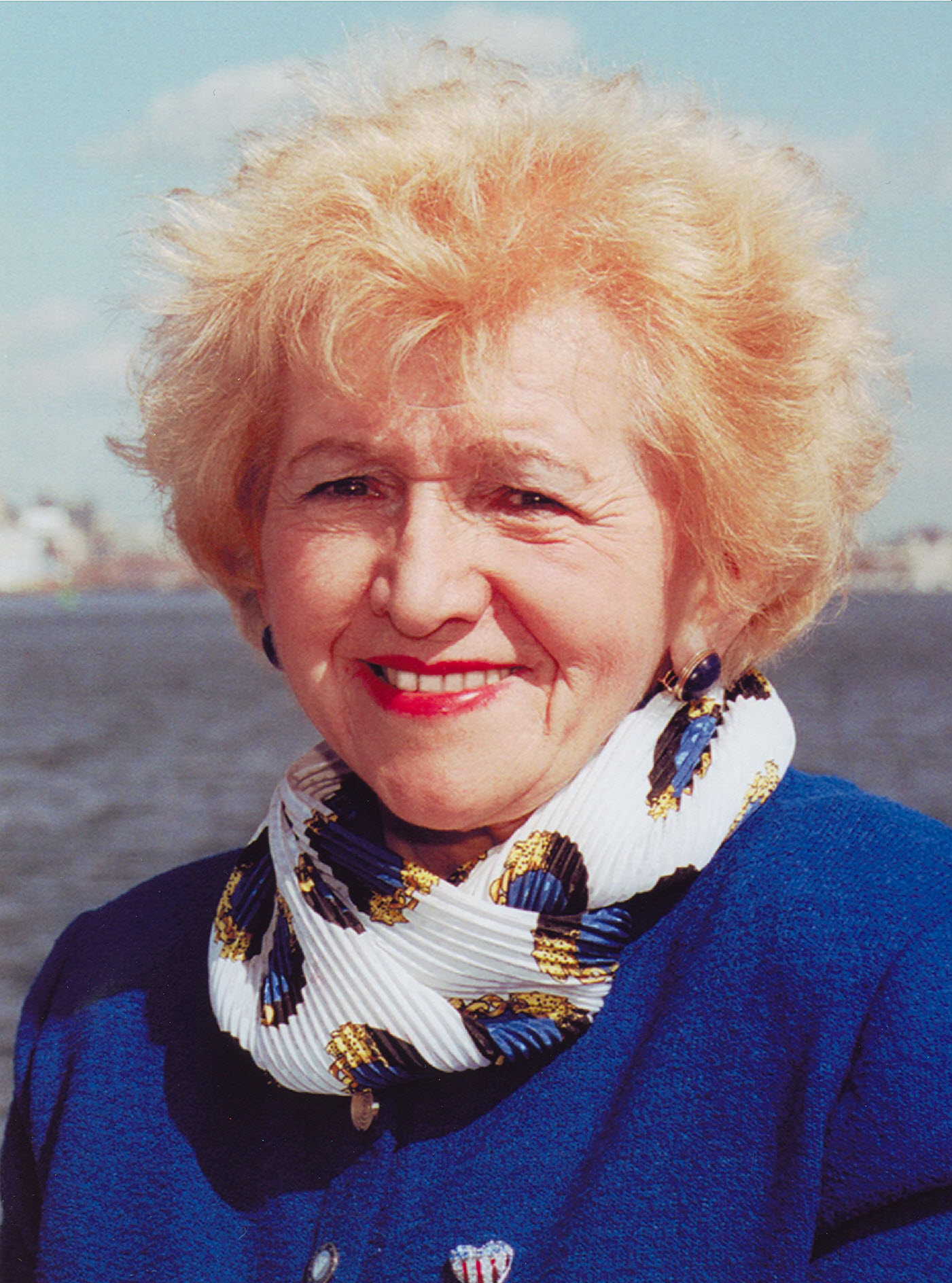
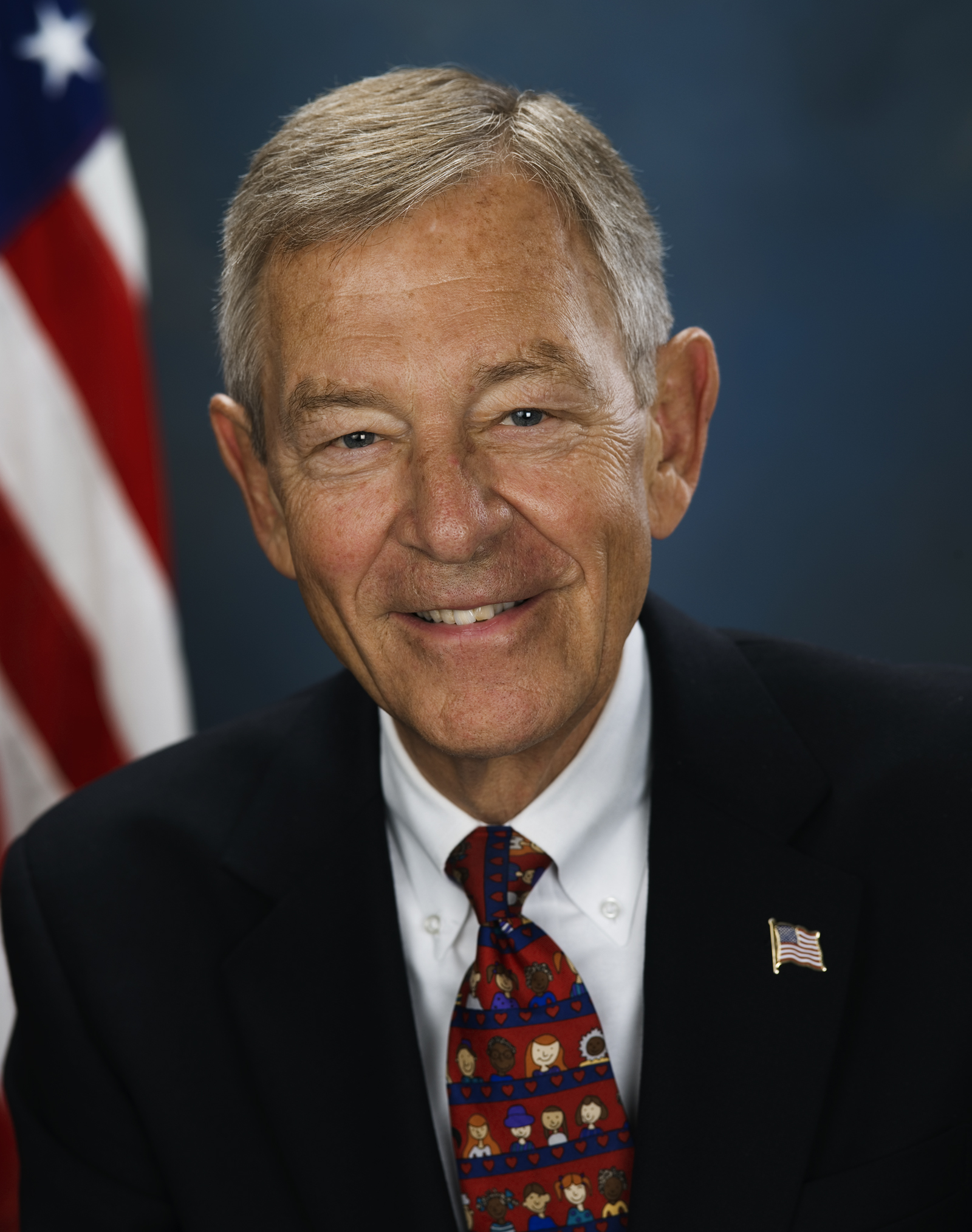
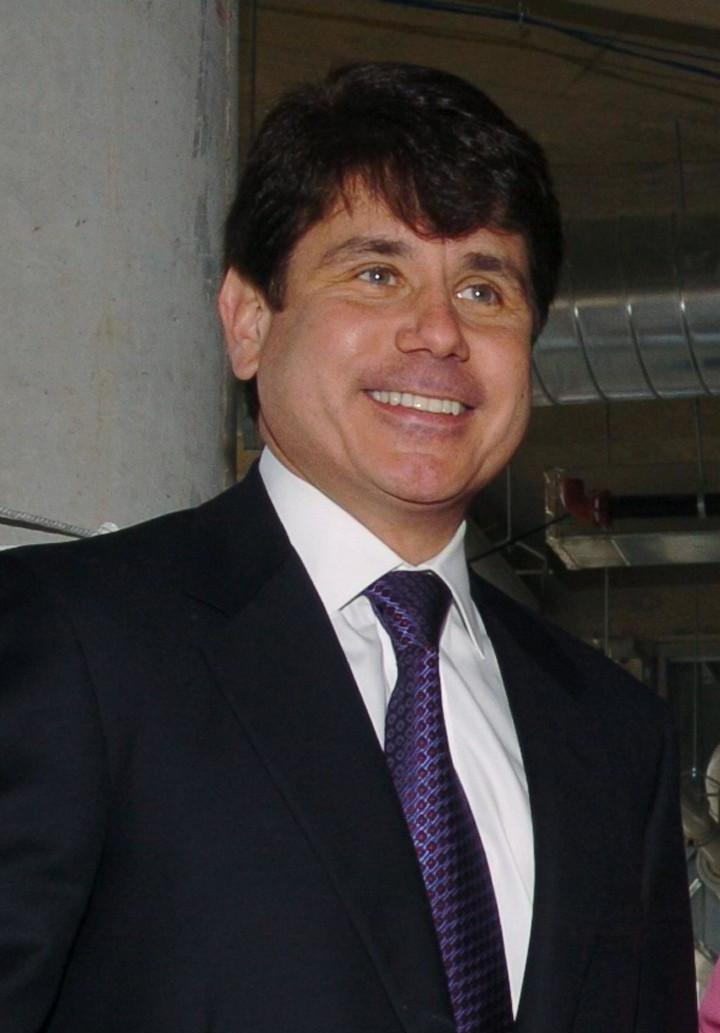
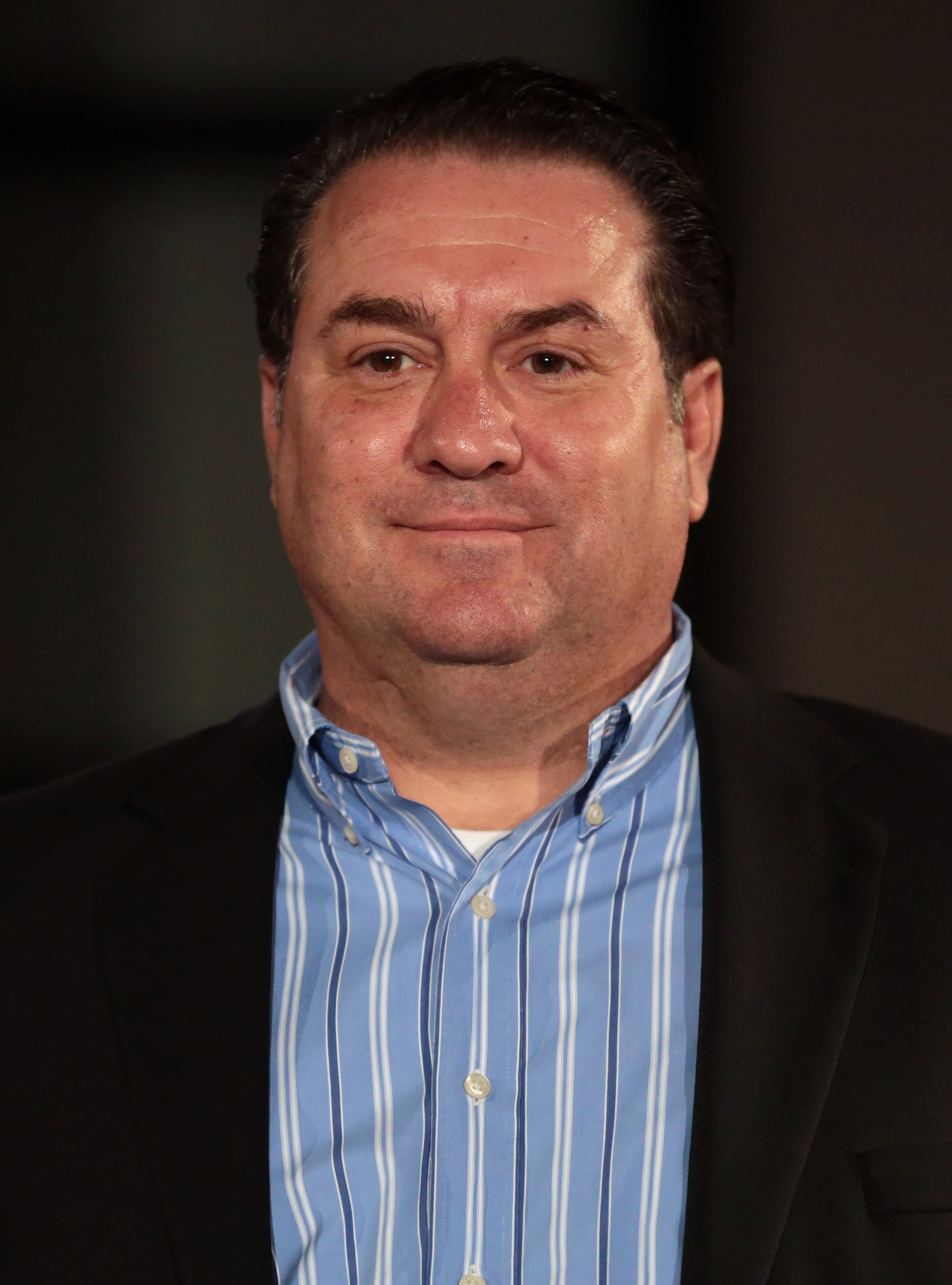
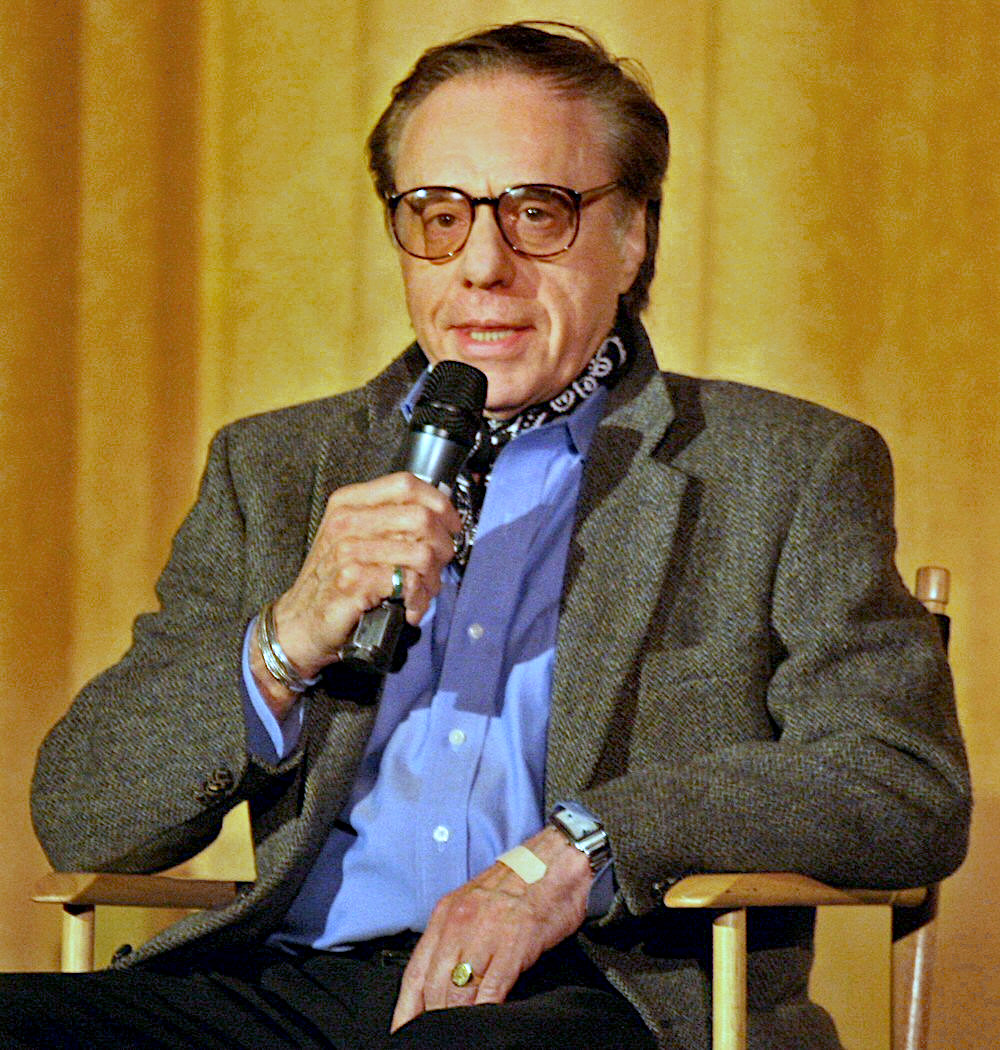
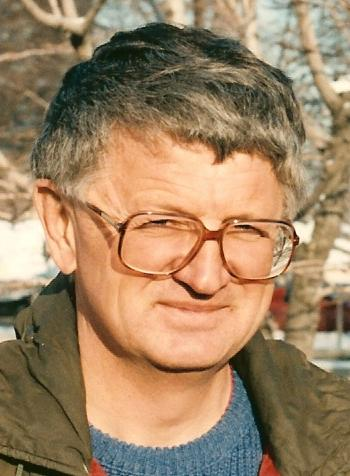
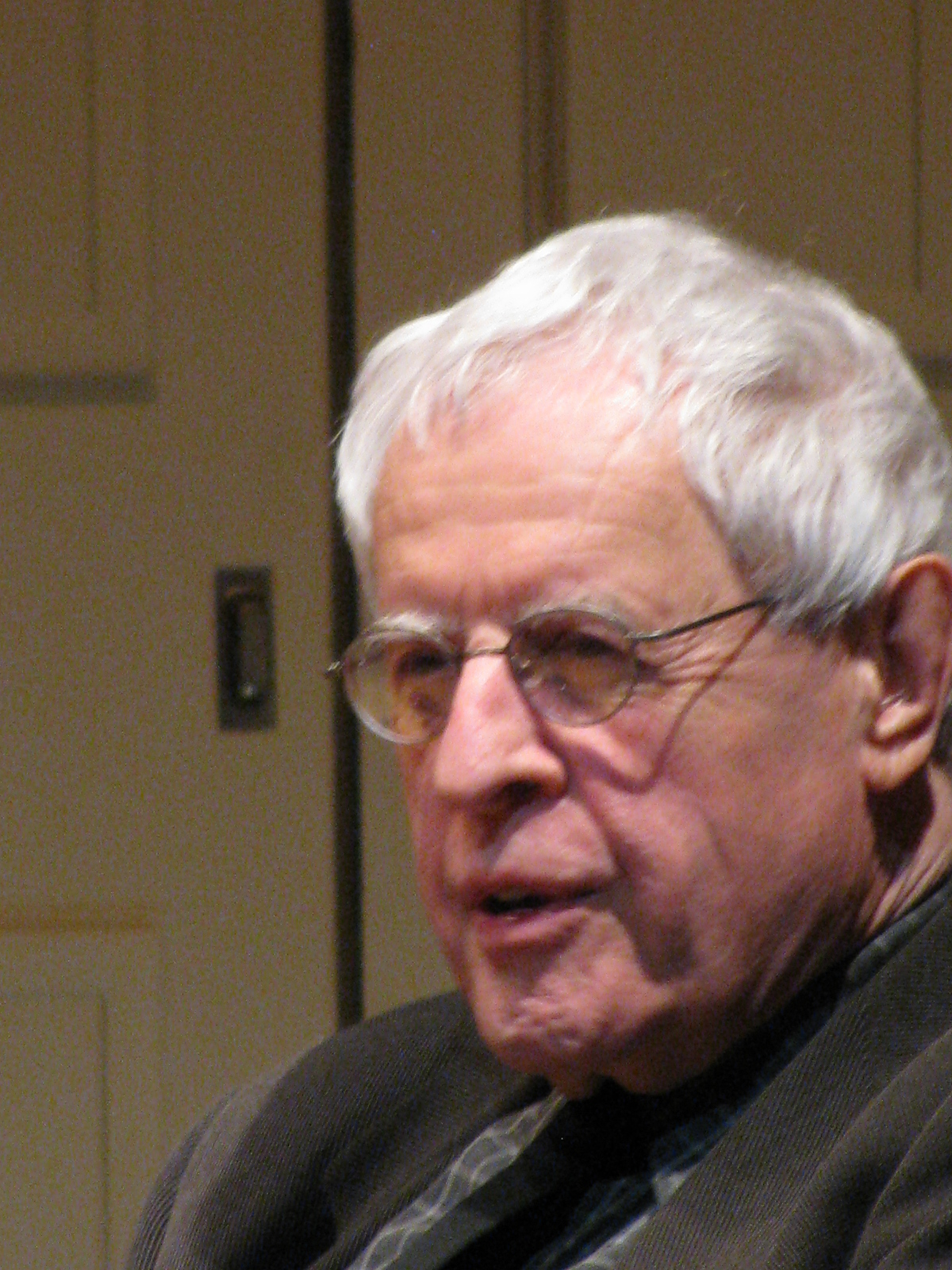
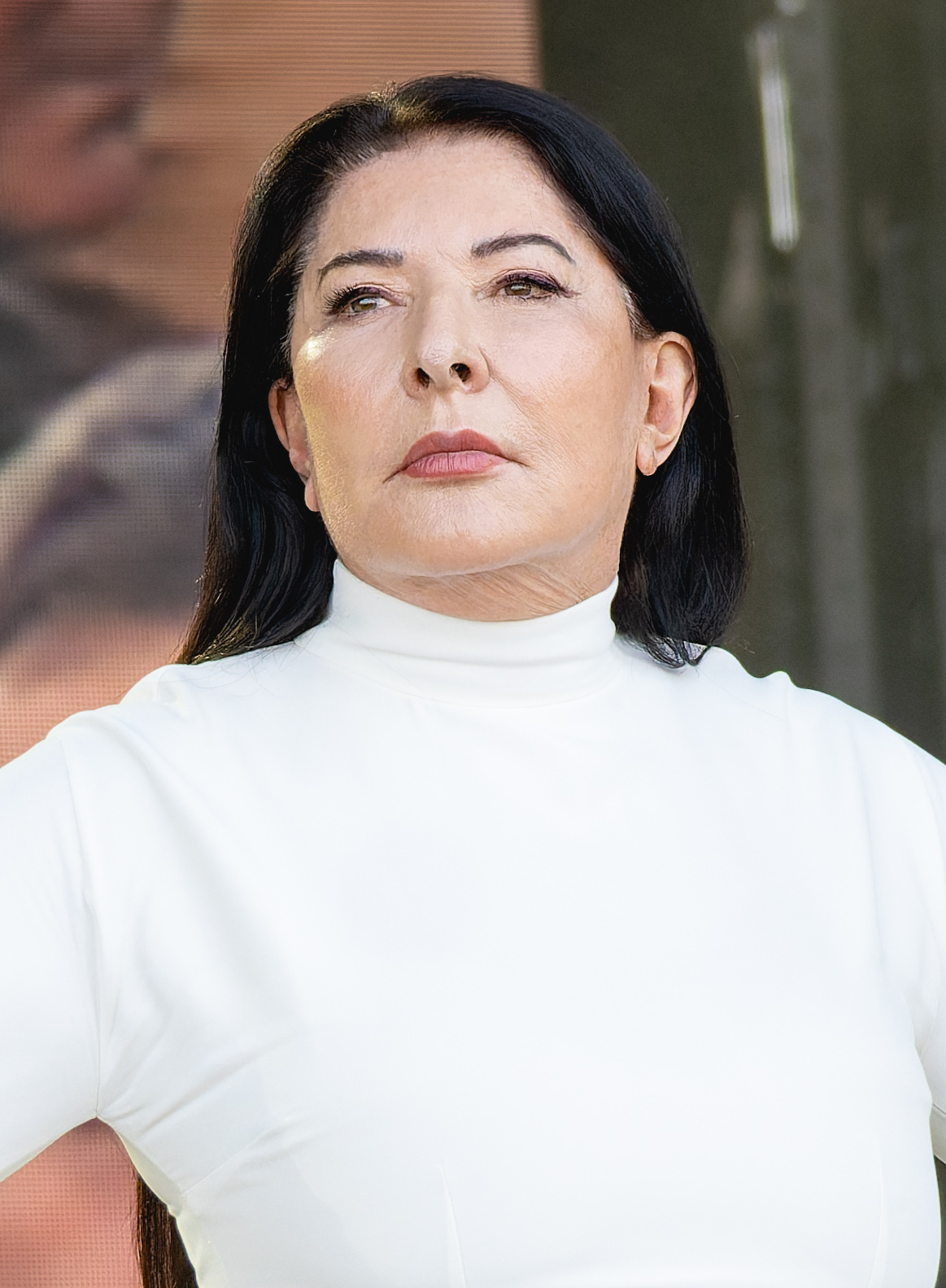
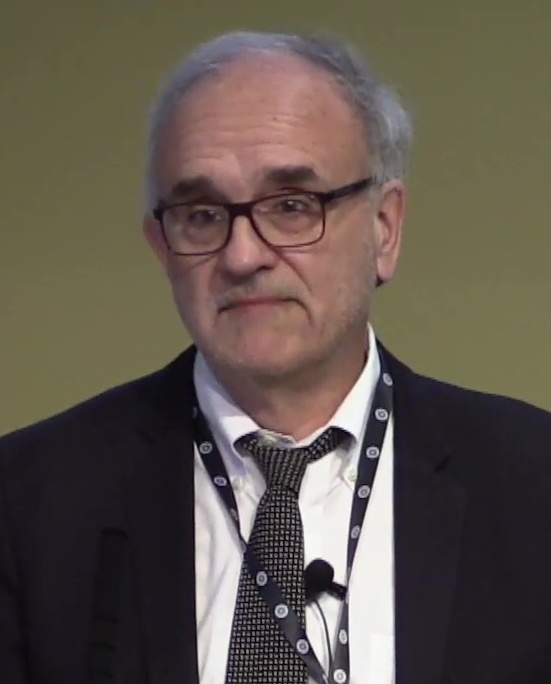
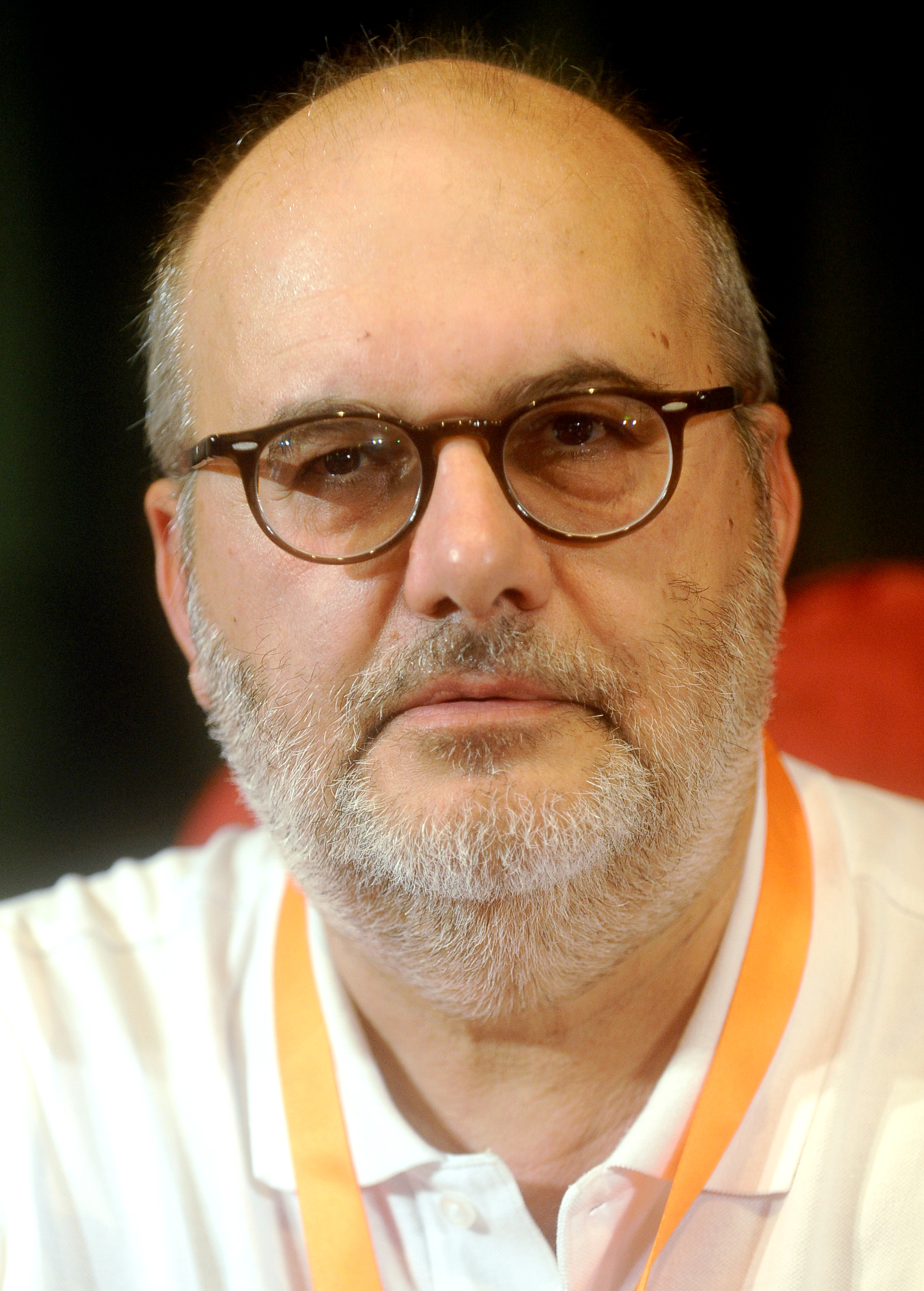
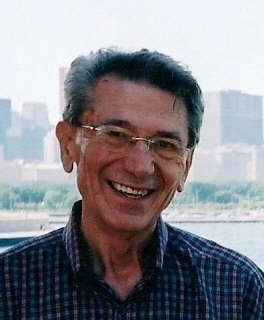
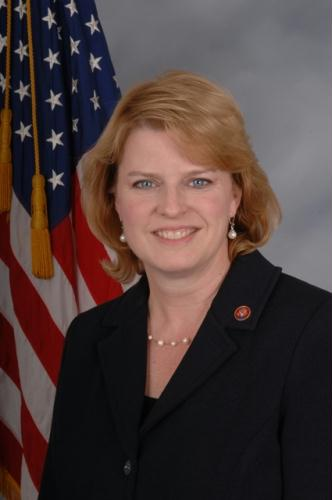
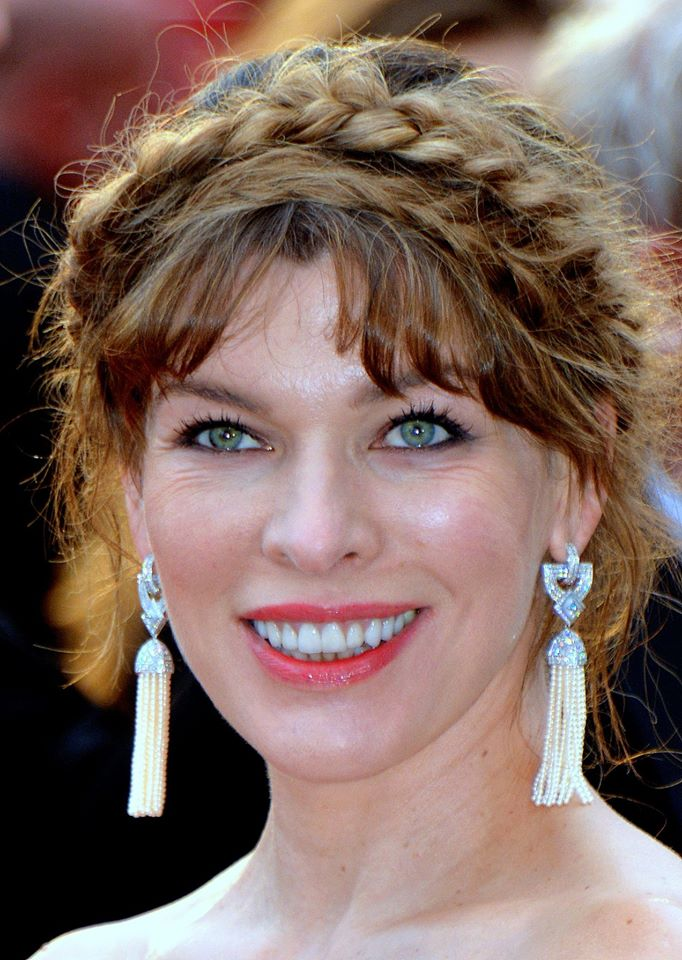
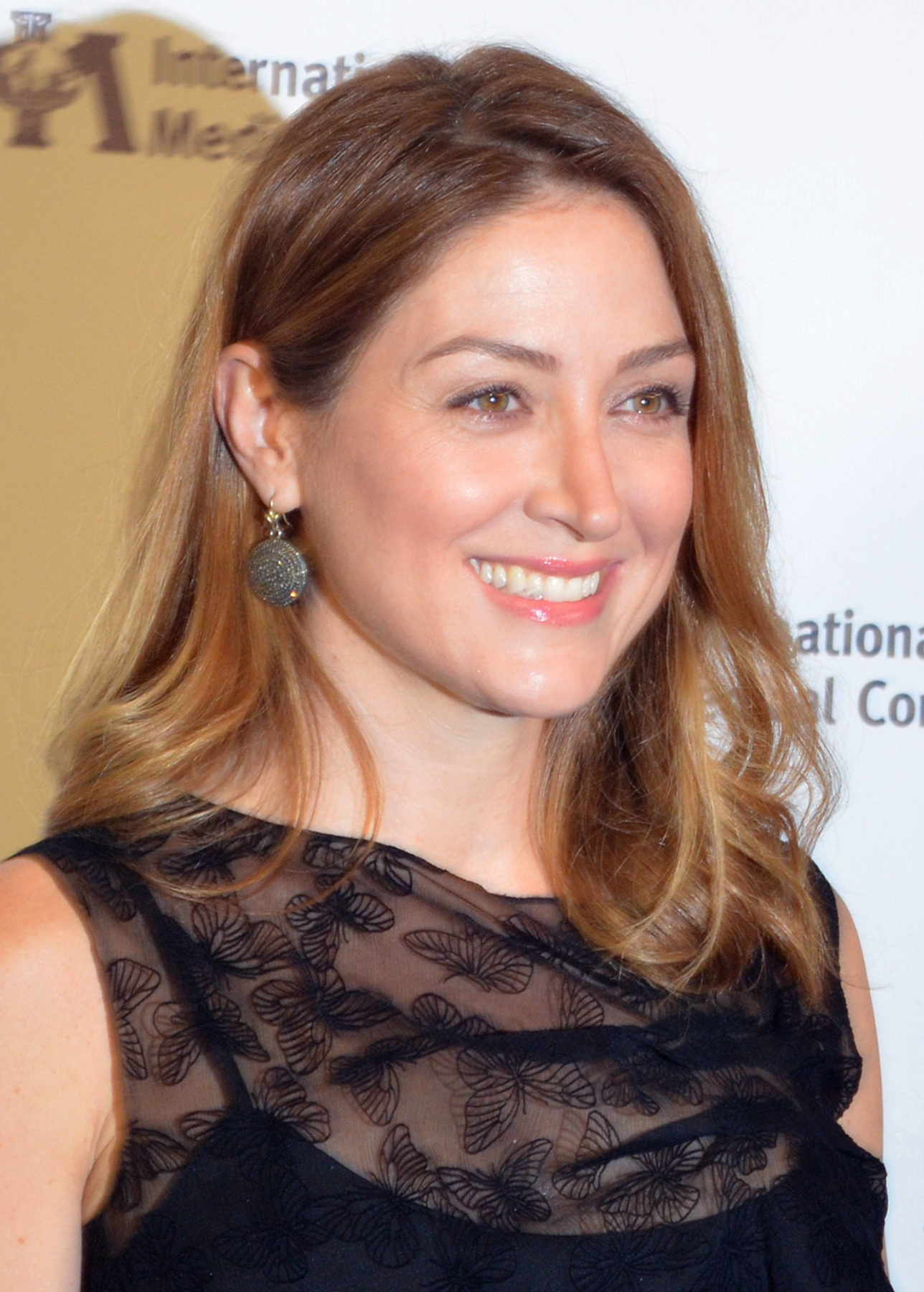
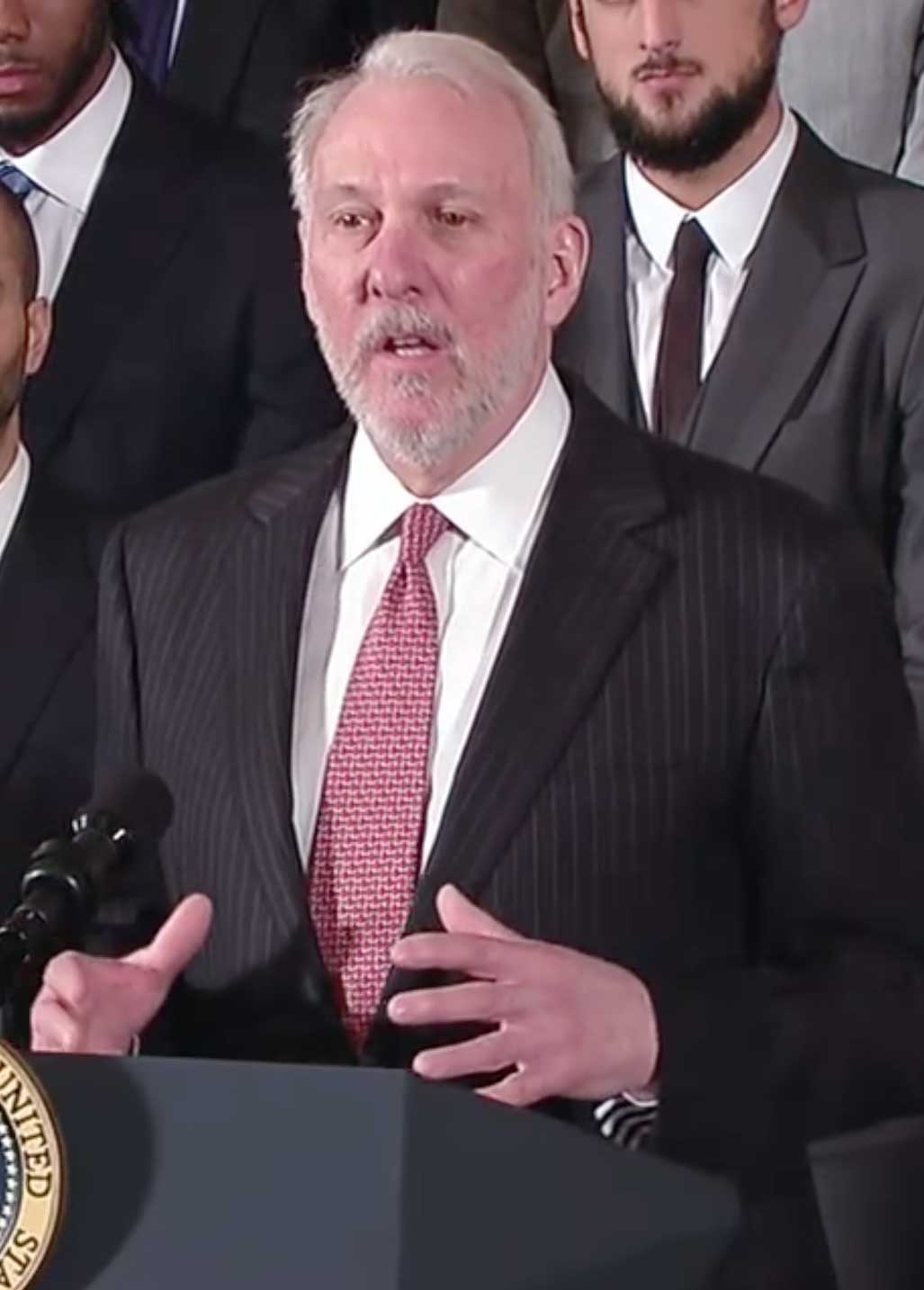
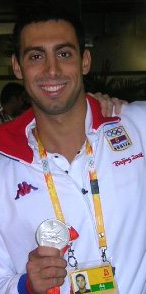
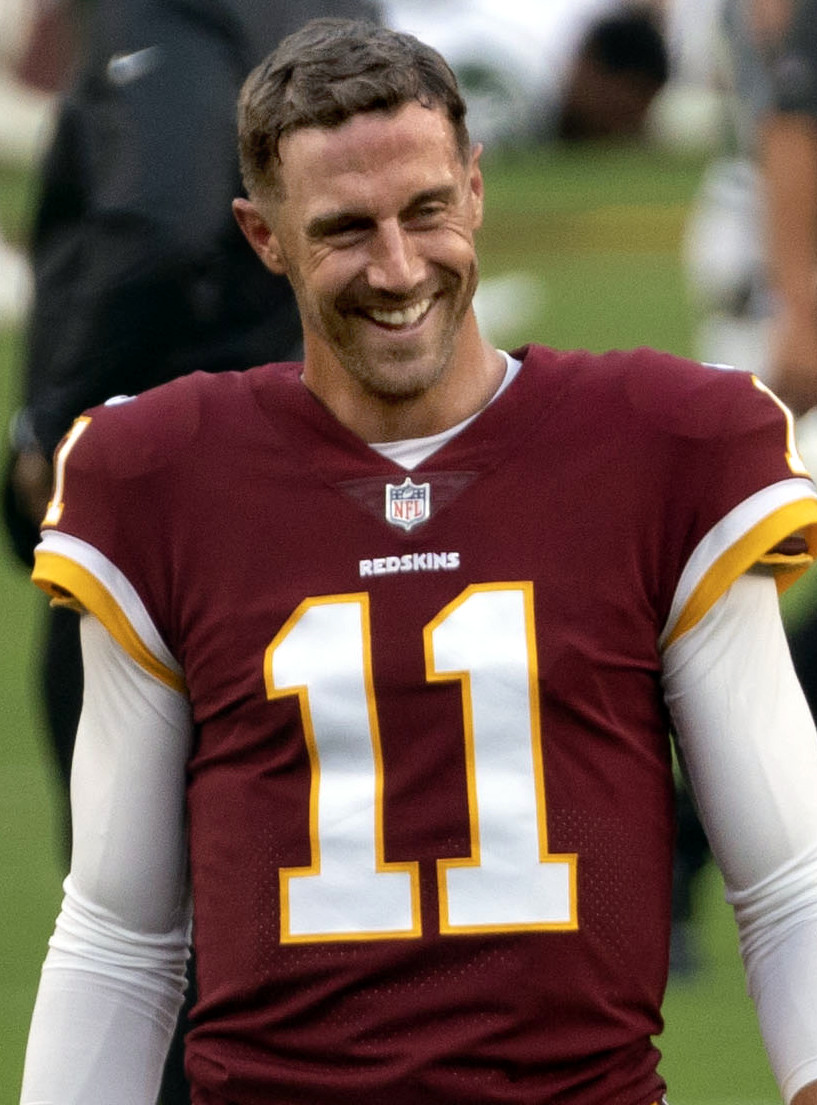
George Fisher	Nikola Tesla	Mihajlo Pupin	Jake Allex	Karl Malden	Mitchell Paige	Brad Dexter	Lance Sijan	Bill Vukovich
Pete Maravich	Helen Delich Bentley	George Voinovich	Rod Blagojevich	Mark Brnovich	Peter Bogdanovich	Steve Tesich	Charles Simic	Marina Abramović
Walt Bogdanich	Branko Milanović	Miodrag Radulovacki	Melissa Bean	Milla Jovovich	Sasha Alexander	Gregg Popovich	Milorad Čavić	Alex Smith

- Marina Abramović – performance artist
- Sasha Alexander – actress
- Jake Allex – military officer
- Melissa Bean – politician
- Helen Delich Bentley – politician
- Rod Blagojevich – politician
- Walt Bogdanich – journalist
- Peter Bogdanovich – actor, director
- Mark Brnovich – politician
- Milorad Čavić – swimmer
- Brad Dexter – actor
- Mike Dimkich – musician
- George Fisher – military officer
- Iva Jovic – tennis player
- Milla Jovovich – actress
- Karl Malden – actor
- Jim Mandich – football player
- Pete Maravich – basketball player
- Branko Milanović – economist
- Catherine Oxenberg – actress
- Mitchell Paige – military officer
- Gregg Popovich – basketball coach
- Mihajlo Pupin – scientist
- Miodrag Radulovački – scientist
- William G. Salatich – business executive
- Lance Sijan – military officer
- Charles Simic – poet
- Alex Smith – football player
- Steve Tesich – screenwriter
- Nikola Tesla – scientist
- George Voinovich – politician
- Bill Vukovich – racing driver
- "Weird Al" Yankovic – musician and actor

== In popular culture ==
- Simone Simon plays Serbian-born fashion designer, Irena Dubrovna, in the 1942 film Cat People and in 1944 sequel The Curse of the Cat People.
- Philip Dorn plays Draža Mihailović in the 1943 film Chetniks! The Fighting Guerrillas.
- Brad Dexter plays Senator East, who gives a Serbian lecture in the 1975 film Shampoo.
- Craig Wasson plays a Serbian American, "Danilo Prozor", in the 1981 film Four Friends.
- Tom Cruise plays a Serbian American, "Stefan Djordjevic", in the 1983 film All the Right Moves.
- Timothy Carhart plays a Serbian American detective, "Ian Zenovich", in the 1985 film Witness.
- Someone Else's America, a 1995 Serbian drama film, depicts the lives of a Serb illegal immigrant and his family.
- Diplomatic Siege, a 1999 action film, features Serbian kidnappers demanding the release of a war criminal.
- Sam Rockwell plays a Serbian-American boxer, "Pero Mahalovic", in the 2002 film Welcome to Collinwood.
- Good Night and Good Luck, a 2005 drama film, depicts the events around the discharging of Serbian American Milo Radulovich during the Red Scare.
- Grand Theft Auto IV, the 2008 video game, features as main protagonist Niko Bellic, a Serb who immigrated to the United States.
- Killing Season, 2013 action thriller film, features feud between American and Serb veterans.
- Tesla Nation, 2018 documentary film on Serbian Americans.

== See also ==
- Immigration to the United States
- European Americans
- Serb diaspora
- Serbia–United States relations
- Serbian Orthodox Church in North and South America

== Sources ==
- Alter, Peter T. (2013). "Serbs and Serbian Americans, 1940-present". In Barkan, Elliott Robert (ed.). Immigrants in American History: Arrival, Adaptation, and Integration. Santa Barbara, California: ABC-CLIO, LLC. pp. 1, 257–1, 263. ISBN 978-1-59884-220-3.
- Bock-Luna, Birgit (2005). The Past in Exile: Serbian Long-distance Nationalism and Identity in the Wake of the Third Balkan War. Berlin, Germany: LIT Verlag Münster. ISBN 978-3-8258-9752-9.
- Henderson, George; Olasiji, Thompson Dele (1995). Migrants, Immigrants, and Slaves: Racial and Ethnic Groups in America. Lanham, Maryland: University Press of America. ISBN 0-8191-9738-6.
- Paul, Rachel (2002). "Serbian-American Mobilization and Lobbying: The Relevance of Jasenovac and Kosovo to Contemporary Grassroots Efforts in the United States". In Ambrosio, Thomas (ed.). Ethnic Identity Groups and United States Foreign Policy. Westport, CT.: Greenwood Publishing Group. ISBN 0-275-97532-0.
- Powell, John (2005). Encyclopedia of North American Immigration. Infobase Publishing. ISBN 9781438110127.
