= Veljko Petrović (poet) =

Serbian poet

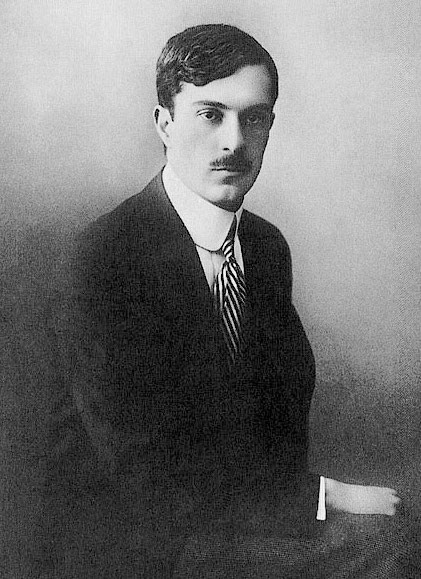
Petrović in 1905

Veljko Petrović (Serbian Cyrillic: Вељко Петровић; 4 February 1884 - 27 July 1967) was a Serbian poet, short story writer, diplomat, and academic.

== Biography ==
Veljko Petrović was born in Sombor, Vojvodina, then part of Austria-Hungary, on 4 February 1884. His father George was a catechist from Sombor who became a monk after his wife's sudden death, taking the name of Gerasim in a monastery in 1891, and later went on to teach at the well-known seminary, Clerical Grande école of Saint Arsenije in Sremski Karlovci. Veljko's mother Mileva was the daughter of the Sombor parish priest Jovan Momirović. His mother died a few weeks after giving birth. Veljko Petrović had two older sisters, Vida and Andja, and a brother, Milivoj. He finished high school in his native Sombor.

In 1902 he arrived in Budapest where he studied law. At the same time, he was a cadet of the first Serbian college, the Sava Tekelija Institute, better known as the Tekelijanum in Pest, and graduated in 1908 at the same time as his schoolmate Milenko Petrović.

As a young man, Petrović wrote about the pronounced apathy of the Serbian youth and people in Sombor, which he said he vegetates and knows little about Serbs from other parts, as well as that they prefer to speak Hungarian en masse.

During the Great War, he was among the many Serbian soldiers who crossed the Albanian mountains in late 1915 and early 1916 during heavy winter storms on their retreat to Corfu. In 1916, after arriving from Corfu to Salonika, he published the patriotic poem "Serbia" on the front page of the American Srbobran.

Between the two wars, Veljko Petrović was active in the diplomatic service, and cultural and educational affairs. In 1918 he was elected a member of the Yugoslav Committee. At that time, Veljko hoped to be appointed ambassador to Budapest, but instead in 1919 he was appointed a clerk in the department of the Ministry of education for Bačka, Banat and Baranja in Novi Sad. Veljko Petrović was a mason and his rise in public and cultural-artistic life was undoubtedly supported from that milieu. He led many organizations, boards, associations, and was a keynote speaker who directed cultural trends. The following year, 1920, he was transferred to the Ministry of Education in Belgrade. Between 1921 and 1923, he was the head of the Cabinet of Ministers, then he was appointed a clerk in the Art Department, and from December 1924 he became an inspector in the same Ministry. Later, Petrović was promoted and was the head of the Ministry of Education for many years (1927).

Veljko Petrović became vice-president of the Belgrade PEN Club in 1928. In 1929, with the help of Miloš Crnjanski, then a member of the press bureau at the Embassy of the Kingdom of Yugoslavia in Berlin, Veljko Petrović stayed in the German capital, where he met leading figures in German cultural life.

In February 1936, the former corresponding member of the Serbian Royal Academy, Veljko Petrović, a writer, was elected a regular member. There was a Writers' Association in Belgrade in 1925, whose president was Petrović at the time. In Belgrade, a new association of writers was initiated by the Belgrade Center of the Pen Club. The first assembly of the Writers' Association was held in March 1937 in the hall of the Belgrade cafe "Kod dva jelena". Veljko Petrović was elected president at that stormy gathering, in front of about forty writers present. In January 1938, he was appointed program director of the Belgrade Radio Station.

He died in Belgrade, at the time in SR Serbia, Yugoslavia.

== Works ==
- 1902: Rodoljubive pesme (Patriotic Poems);
- 1909: Bunja
- 1912: Na pragu (On the Threshold);
- 1921: Bunja i drugi iz Ravnagrad (Bunja and Others from Ravangrad);
- 1921: Varljivo Proleće (Deceptive Spring)
- 1922: Poverenje savesti (Demented Consciences)
- 1922: Tri pripovetke (Three Tales);
- 1924: Iskušenja (Temptations);
- 1925: Priče (Tales)
- 1932: Izdanci iz zapaljena grma (Shoots from a Burning Stump);
- 1948: Prepelica u ruci (A Quail in the hand);
- 1964: Dah života (Breath of Life).
