= Gordana Vunjak-Novakovic =

Serbian American engineer

- Гордана Вуњак Новаковић
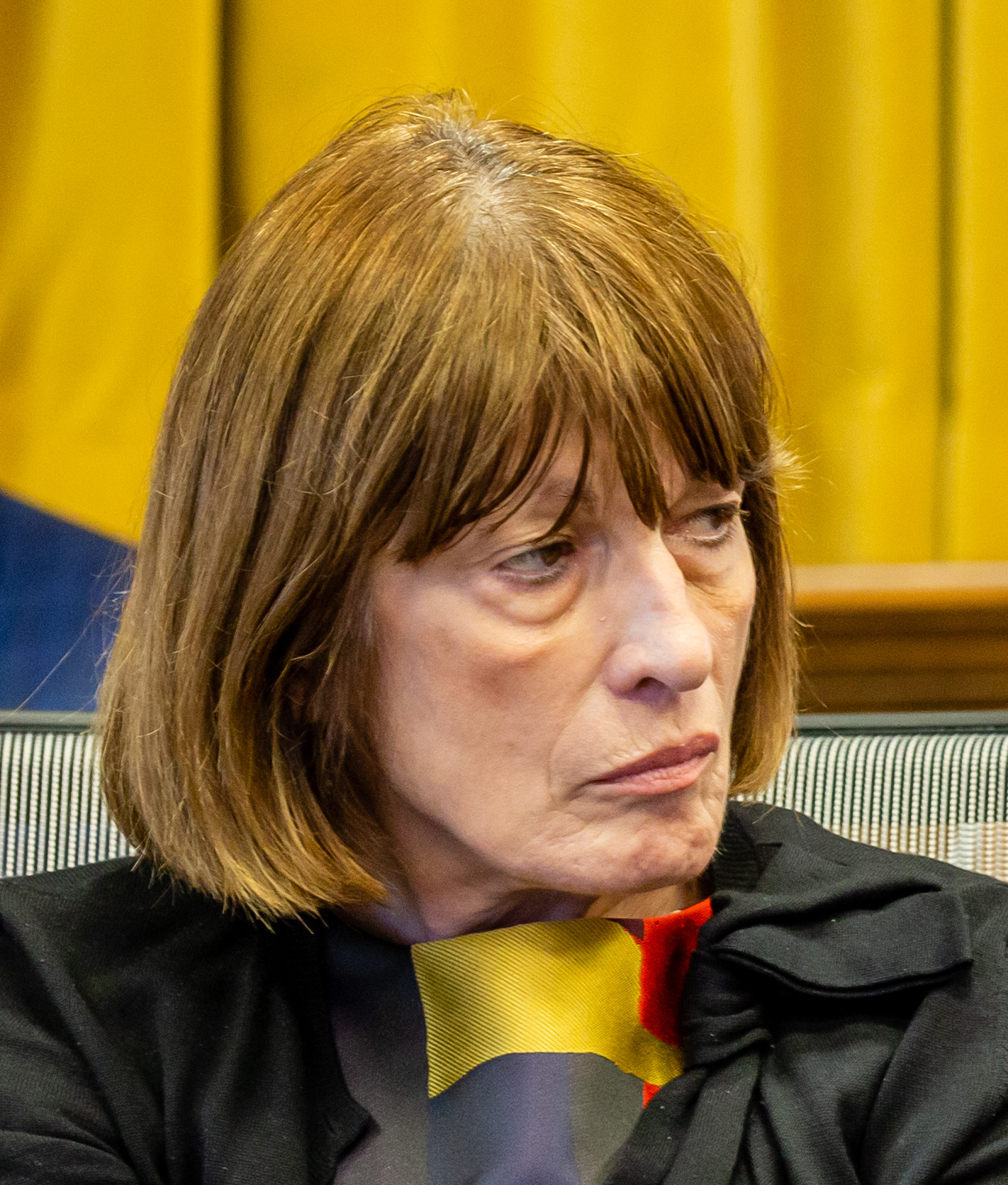
- Born: Belgrade, Serbia
- Education: University of Belgrade
- Scientific career
- Workplaces: Columbia University; University of Belgrade; University of Novi Sad; Tufts University

Gordana Vunjak-Novakovic (Serbian Cyrillic: Гордана Вуњак Новаковић) FRSC is a Serbian American biomedical engineer and university professor. She is a university professor at Columbia University, as well as the Mikati Foundation Professor of Biomedical Engineering and Medical Sciences. She also heads the laboratory for Stem Cells and Tissue Engineering at Columbia University. She is part of the faculty at the Irving Comprehensive Cancer Center and the Center for Human Development, both found at Columbia University. She is also an honorary professor at the Faculty of Technology and Metallurgy at the University of Belgrade, an honorary professor at the University of Novi Sad, and an adjunct professor at the Department of Biomedical Engineering at Tufts University.

Her focus is on engineering human tissues for regenerative medicine, stem cell research and modeling of disease. Together with her team she has published over 380 scientific papers, 70 book chapters and three books on tissue engineering. Vunjak-Novakovic has also given 380 invited lectures across the world and is named as co-inventor on 100 licensed, issued and pending patents. Building on these patents she co-founded four biotech companies: EpiBone, TARA Biosystems, Xylyx Bio, and Immplacate Health. Additionally, she is a frequent advisor to the federal government on tissue engineering and regenerative medicine.

== Biography ==
Vunjak received her B.S., M.S., and Ph.D. in chemical engineering from the University of Belgrade, in Belgrade, Serbia, her birthplace. After her postgraduate study in Germany, she returned as a faculty to the University of Belgrade in its Chemical Engineering Department. She was a Fulbright Fellow at Massachusetts Institute of Technology's Harvard–MIT Division of Health Sciences and Technology from 1986 to 1987 and held joint appointments as research scientist at the Whitaker College of Health Sciences and Technology at MIT (1993–1998) and as adjunct professor in the Department of Biomedical Engineering at Tufts University (1994–2004). In 1998 she became a full-time principal research scientist with the Harvard–MIT Division of Health Science and Technology at MIT, where she collaborated, among others, with biomedical engineer Robert S. Langer. In 2005, she accepted a position as full professor with the Department of Biomedical Engineering at Columbia University.

== Research ==
Vunjak-Novakovic's numerous scholarly accomplishments have substantially impacted the field of tissue engineering in specific and the field of biomedical engineering in general. The focus of her research is on engineering functional human tissues, by an integrated use of stem cells, biomaterial scaffolds and bioreactors, which are culture systems designed to regulate and stimulate tissue development. In her work she has laid the theoretical and experimental foundation for the development of new biomaterials and scaffold architecture to regenerate tissue. For example, a series of 5 papers on bioreactors, seeding of polymer scaffolds for cartilage tissue engineering, cultivation parameters, and tissue construct characterization, published in 1998 and 1999 have been cited over 2,000 times. Building on these efforts, Vunjak-Novakovic continued to perform complex cell biological studies that address fundamental problems such as the growth and differentiation of stem cells for functional skeletal and cardiac mechanics, the growth of mammalian cells in microgravity environment, and the role of chondrocytes in cartilage tissue biomechanics. In ways not achieved by any other research team, Vunjak-Novakovic's group has succeeded to control cell growth, metabolism and function of engineered human tissues. This has garnered her highest praise and recognition of the scientific community. She is now starting to translate this foundation into clinical applications.

== Recognition ==
In 2007, Vunjak-Novakovic became the first woman engineer to receive the distinction of giving the Director's Lecture at the National Institute of Health. In 2008, she was inducted into the Women in Technology International Hall of Fame, and in 2009, she was elected to the New York Academy of Sciences. One year later she received the Clemson Award of the Society of Biomaterials "for significant contributions to the literature on the science or technology of biomaterials." Vunjak-Novakovic is currently serving on the Council of NIBIB, and has previously served as a Chair of Fellows of the American Institute for Medical and Biological Engineering. She is a fellow of the Biomedical Engineering Society, a fellow of AAAS, and a founding fellow of TERMIS. She is a member of the Academia Europaea, Serbian Academy of Sciences and Arts, and one of Foreign Policy 100 leading global thinkers for 2014. She is the recipient of the Robert A. Pritzker Distinguished Lecture Award for 2017, the premier award of the Biomedical Engineering Society.

In 2012 she was elected to the National Academy of Engineering "for bioreactor systems and modeling approaches for tissue engineering and regenerative medicine," becoming the first woman at Columbia to ever earn the prestigious distinction. Two years later this was followed by the elections to the National Academy of Medicine, and the National Academy of Inventors. In 2019, she was elected to the American Academy of Arts and Sciences.

In 2017, Vunjak-Novakovic was appointed to the rank of University Professor at Columbia University, the institution's highest academic honor reserved for a small number of faculty who have made the most important contributions to their field of study, and serve the university as a whole.

In February 2021, she was awarded the Sretenje order of the Republic of Serbia. In July 2021, she was as awarded the Popular Prize by the European Inventor Award.

Her work has been featured in The New York Times, Scientific American, Forbes Magazine, National Public Radio (NPR), and the BBC. She appeared in 2018 as herself in the documentary film Tesla Nation.
