= Tesla Nation =

2018 Serbian documentary film

- Official poster
- Directed by: Željko Mirković
- Written by: Željko Mirković; Miloš Rastović; Marko Lopušina
- Produced by: Željko Mirković
- Cinematography: Milan Marić; Ognjen Milović
- Edited by: Pavle Nikic
- Production company: Optimistic Film
- Release date: 27 October 2018
- Running time: 83 minutes
- Country: Serbia
- Languages: Serbian and English

Tesla Nation (Serbian: Теслин народ) is a 2018 Serbian documentary film directed by Željko Mirković starring Jack Dimich. It was shortlisted as a candidate for the Academy Award.

== Synopsis ==
The film follows the history of Serbian Americans and notable people from the group, their contributions to United States and personal stories.

== Cast ==
- Jack Dimich - Nikola Tesla
- Helen Delich Bentley - Herself
- Walt Bogdanich - Himself
- Anna Thea Bogdanovich - Herself
- Peter Bogdanovich - Himself
- Vladimir Bulovic - Himself
- Karl Malden - Himself
- Gordana Vunjak-Novakovic - Herself
- George Voinovich - Himself
