= Capitalism, Alone =

2019 nonfiction book by Branko Milanovic

Capitalism, Alone: The Future of the System That Rules the World
- First edition
- Author: Branko Milanovic
- Language: English
- Genre: Non-fiction
- Publisher: Belknap Press
- Publication date: 24 May 2019
- Publication place: Cambridge, MA
- ISBN: 9780674987593
- Preceded by: Global inequality: A New Approach for the Age of Globalization (2016)

Capitalism, Alone: The Future of the System That Rules the World is a 2019 non-fiction book published by Belknap Press by Branko Milanovic, an economist at the Stone Centre on Socioeconomic Inequality at the City University of New York.

== Themes ==
According to The Economist, in Capitalism, Alone Milanovic "argues that this unification of humankind under a single social system lends support to the view of history as a march towards progress."

== Reviews ==
The review in The New Yorker said that Milanovic is a "whiz at number crunching" and "has a whimsical, wide-ranging appreciation for history and culture." Milanovic had "demonstrated how the benefits of globalization had been distributed among different classes across various groups of countries" by "using a giant World Bank database of household incomes in the 1990s. In Capitalism, Alone, he has "richly detailed" the consequences of inequality.

Roberto Iacono said the book was "remarkable" and "possibly the author's most comprehensive opus so far."

The Wall Street Journal said that the book was a "stunted recitation of the political and economic crises afflicting Western capitalism, an unpersuasive account of China's economic model as a potential alternative and an implausibly dystopian vision of global capitalism’s future."

An article published as an International Monetary Fund (IMF) book review, said that the "valuable, data-rich, and thoughtful" book was an "ambitious and provocative examination of the present and the future of capitalism."
