= Branko Milanović =

Serbian-American economist

- Бранко Милановић
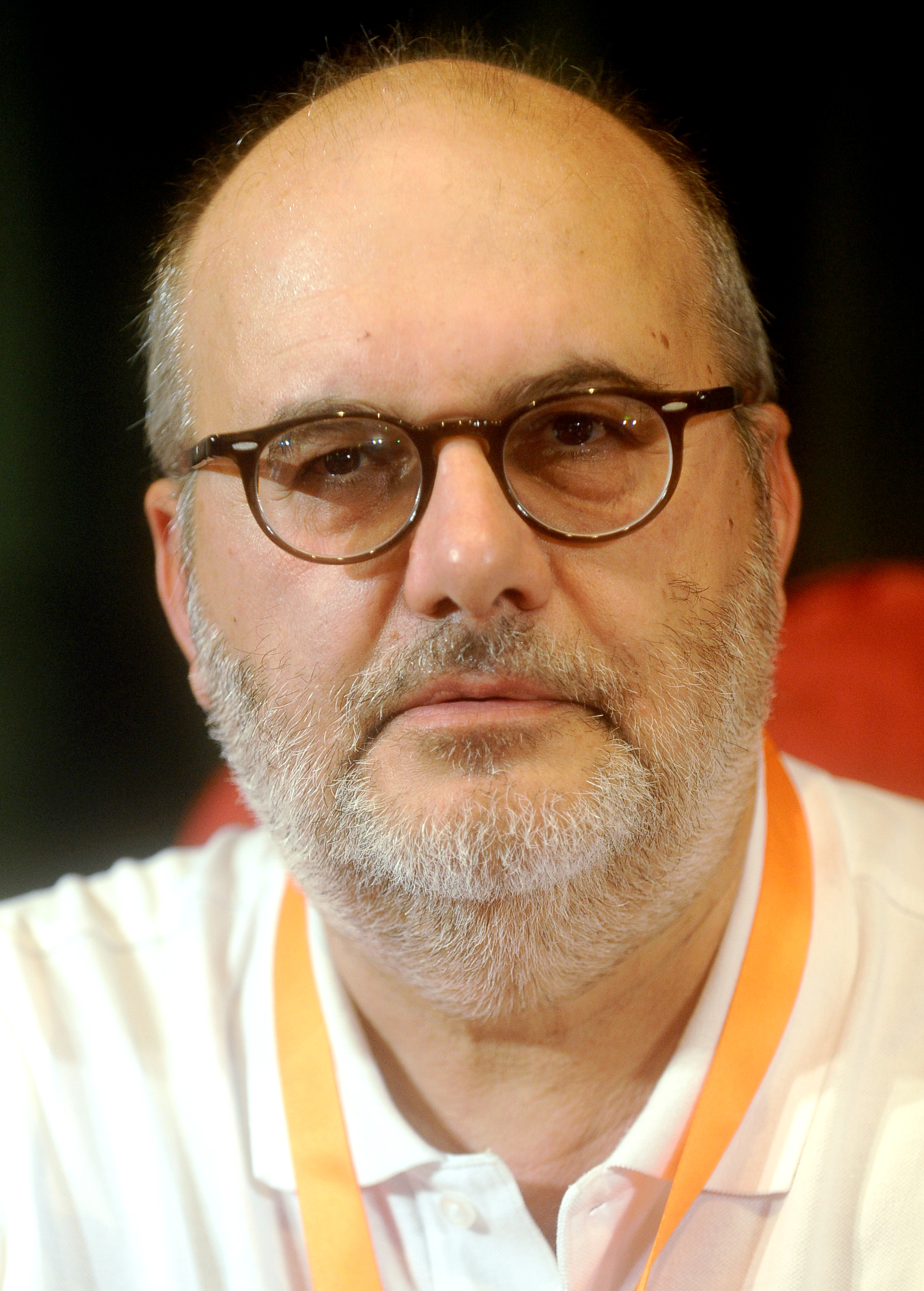
- Milanović in 2018
- Born: October 24, 1953 (age 72); Belgrade, PR Serbia, Yugoslavia

Academic background
- Education: University of Belgrade

Academic work
- Discipline: Economic inequality Economic growth
- Institutions: City University of New York; Luxembourg Income Study
- Awards: Hans-Matthöfer-Preis für Wirtschaftspublizistik (2018); Leontief Prize for Advancing the Frontiers of Economic Knowledge (2018)
- Website: glineq.blogspot.com

Branko Milanović (Serbian Cyrillic: Бранко Милановић, IPA: [brǎːŋko mǐlanoʋitɕ; milǎːn-]) is a Serbian-American economist and university professor. He is most known for his work on income distribution and inequality. Since January 2014, he has been a research professor at the Graduate Center of the City University of New York and an affiliated senior scholar at the Luxembourg Income Study (LIS). He also teaches at the London School of Economics and the Barcelona Institute for International Studies. In 2019, he has been appointed the honorary Maddison Chair at the University of Groningen.

Milanović formerly was a lead economist in the World Bank's research department, visiting professor at University of Maryland and Johns Hopkins University. Between 2003 and 2005 he was senior associate at Carnegie Endowment for International Peace in Washington. He remained an adjunct scholar with the Endowment until early 2010. He did his Ph.D. at the University of Belgrade in 1987 on economic inequality in Yugoslavia, using for the first time micro data from Yugoslav household surveys. He published it as a book in 1990. He has been a visiting scholar at All Souls College in Oxford.

== Early life ==
Branko Milanović was born in 1953 in Yugoslavia. His father was a government official. Later in life, he recalled watching the protests of 1968, when students, "sporting red Karl Marx badges," occupied the University of Belgrade campus with banners proclaiming “Down with the Red bourgeoisie!” and wondering whether he and his family belonged in that group. He said that "the social and political aspects of the protests became clearer later" to him.

== Scholarly work on inequality ==
Milanovic has published a large number of papers, including forty for the World Bank, mainly on world inequality and poverty. His 2005 book, Worlds Apart covered global income disparity between countries as well as between individuals in the world. His joint work with Jeffrey Williamson and Peter Lindert ("Economic Journal", March 2011), was considered by The Economist to "contain the germ of an important advance in thinking about inequality".

Milanovic is the author of 2011's The Haves and the Have-Nots, a collection of essays on income distribution, selected by The Globalist The Haves and the Have-Nots as the number one book on its "top books of 2011" list. Milanovic serves on the advisory board for Academics Stand Against Poverty (ASAP). In August 2013, he was included by Foreign Policy among the top 100 "twitterati" to follow. In November 2014, he became an external fellow of the Center for Global Development in Washington, DC. He has written the blog globalinequality since May 2014. and from 2021 Substack "Global inequality and More 3.0"

His book Global inequality: A New Approach for the Age of Globalization was published in April 2016. The book, in its German translation (Die ungleiche Welt. Migration, das Eine Prozent, und die Zukunft der Mittelschicht, "The Unequal World. Immigration, the one percent, and the future of the middle class"), received the Bruno Kreisky Prize for the best political book of 2016, the 2018 Hans Matthöfer Prize for the best book in economics awarded by the Friedrich Ebert Foundation, and was included in the Financial Times 12 top books in business and economics published in 2016. He received, together with Mariana Mazzucato, the 2018 Leontief Prize for Advancing the Frontiers of Economic Thought.

His book Capitalism, Alone: The Future of the System that Rules the World was published in September 2019. It was included by the Foreign Affairs magazine on the Best Books list for 2020. In July 2020, the magazine Prospect included him among the top 50 thinkers for the year 2020.

=== Elephant curve ===
Milanović became widely known for the "elephant-shaped curve" that first appeared in a 2013 article titled "Global Income Distribution: From the Fall of the Berlin Wall to the Great Recession", co-written with Christoph Lakner, senior economist of the World Bank. The graph showed that those around the 70th–90th percentile in global income, roughly corresponding to the lower earners in the developed world, had missed out on real-income growth over the twenty years between 1988 and 2008.

In 2020, he published an update of the global-growth curve, which ostensibly showed how the distribution of income growth has changed in the years following 2008. The data showed that, since the 2008 financial crisis, the incomes of the poorest people in the world have risen the fastest. The Financial Times commented that "the latest data indicates a clear link between trade integration and falling global inequality" and "a large reduction in global inequality over the past decade" but "again requires careful interpretation" because "as Milanovic says, over the past 30 years there has been 'the greatest reshuffle of individual income positions since the Industrial Revolution'", resulting, among other developments, in "lower-income urban Chinese households, who came close to the bottom of the global distribution in 1988, now enjoy[ing] living standards above the global median."

In October 2023, Milanovic published a history of studies of income inequality "Visions of Inequality", for which he received the Joseph J. Spengler 2025 prize awarded by History of Economics Society. In October 2025, he received the title of Doctor Honoris Causa from Université de Génève.

== Selected works ==
=== Books ===
- Liberalization and Entrepreneurship. Dynamics of Reform in Socialism and Capitalism, 1989. M.E. Sharpe.
- Income, Inequality, and Poverty during the Transition from Planned To Market Economy. 1998. World Bank.
- (with Ethan Kapstein) Income and Influence. 2003. Upjohn Institute.
- (with Christiaan Grootaert and Jeanine Braithwaite) Poverty and Social Assistance in Transition Countries. 1999. St. Martin's Press.
- Worlds Apart. Measuring International and Global Inequality. 2005. Princeton/Oxford.
- The Haves and the Have-Nots: A Brief and Idiosyncratic History of Global Inequality, 2010, Basic Books, New York.
- Global inequality: A New Approach for the Age of Globalization, 2016, Harvard University Press.
- Capitalism, Alone: The Future of the System That Rules the World, 2019, Harvard University Press.
- Visions of Inequality: From the French Revolution to the End of the Cold War, 2023, Harvard University Press.
- The World Under Capitalism: Observations on Economics, Politics, History and Culture, 2025, Polity Books.
- The Great Global Transformation: National Market Liberalism in a Multipolar World, Nov. 2025, Penguin's/Allen Lane.

=== Articles ===
- (with Marco Ranaldi), “Capitalist systems and income inequality”, Journal of Comparative Economics, 2021
- (with Li Yang and Filip Novokmet), “From workers to capitalists in less than two generations: A study of Chinese urban elite transformation between 1988 and 2013”, British Journal of Sociology, vol. 72, No. 3, June 2021.
- “Towards an explanation of inequality in pre-modern societies: the role of colonies and high population density”, The Economic History Review, vol. 71, No. 4, 2018.
- (with Christoph Lakner), “Global income distribution: from the fall of the Berlin Wall to the Great Recession”, World Bank Economic Review, vol. 30, No. 2, pp. 203–232, July 2016.
- (with Leif Wenar) “Are Liberal Peoples Peaceful?”, Journal of Political Philosophy, Volume 17, Issue 4, 2009.
- Global inequality of opportunity: how much of our income is determined by where we live”, Review of Economics and Statistics, vol. 97, No. 2 (May), 2015.
- (with Peter Lindert and Jeffrey Williamson), “Pre-industrial inequality”, Economic Journal, March 2011,
- “An estimate of average income and inequality in Byzantium around year 1000”, Review of Income and Wealth, vol. 52, No. 3, 2006.
- “Economic integration and income convergence: not such a strong link?”, Review of Economics and Statistics, vol. 88, No, 4, 2006.
- “Can We Discern the Effect of Globalization on Income Distribution? Evidence from Household Budget Surveys", World Bank Economic Review, No. 1, 2005.
- “The Two Faces of Globalization: Against Globalization as We Know it”, World Development, April 2003, pp. 667–683.
- (with Shlomo Yitzhaki), "Decomposing World Income Distribution: Does the World Have a Middle Class?", Review of Income and Wealth, Vol. 48, No. 2, June 2002.
- “True World Income Distribution, 1988 and 1993: First Calculations Based on Household Surveys Alone”, Economic Journal, vol. 112, No. 476, January 2002.
- "Cash Transfers, Direct Taxes and Income Distribution in Late Socialism", Journal of Comparative Economics, No.2, 1994.
- "Remittances and Income Distribution", Journal of Economic Studies, No.5, 1987.
- "Patterns of Regional Growth in Yugoslavia, 1952 1983", Journal of Development Economics, vol. 25, 1987.
- "The Austrian Theory of the Labor Managed Firm", Journal of Comparative Economics, No.6, 1982.
