= George Fisher (settler) =

Texas settler, born 1795

George Fisher Đorđe Šagić
- Ђорђе Шагић
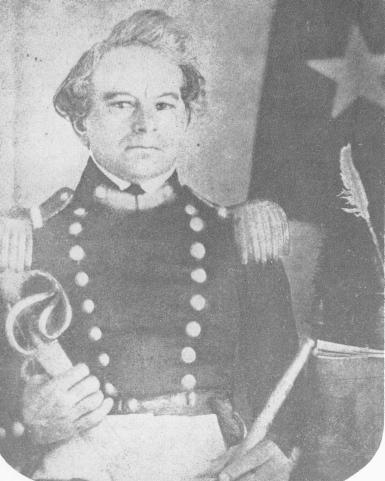
- George Fisher, ca. 1843
- Born: Đorđe Šagić; 30 March 1795; Székesfehérvár, Kingdom of Hungary, Habsburg Empire
- Died: 11 June 1873 (aged 78); San Francisco, California, U.S.
- Military career
- Allegiance: Revolutionary Serbia (1813); Mexico (1829–1835); Republic of Texas (1836–1846); United States of America (1846–1873)
- Branch: Serbian Army, Mexican Army, Texan Army
- Service years: 1813, 1823–1846
- Rank: Major (Texan Army)
- Nickname: Đorđe Ribar
- Conflicts: First Serbian Uprising; Texas Revolution

Đorđe Šagić (Serbian: Ђорђе Шагић; April 30, 1795 – June 11, 1873), also known as George (Jorge) Fisher, was a customs officer, political figure, and early leader of the Texas Revolution.

== Biography ==
Fisher was originally named Đorđe Šagić, and also known as Đorđe Ribar (Serbian: Ђорђе Рибар), which translated into English as George Fisher. He was born to Serbian parents in Székesfehérvár, Hungary in April 1795. Following his father's death Đorđe was sent to the Serbian Orthodox Church seminary in Sremski Karlovci, to train as a priest. He left in 1813 to join the Serbian revolutionary forces during the First Serbian Uprising. After the failed revolution, he emigrated to Philadelphia in the United States in 1814 before heading to Mexico. In 1825, Fisher helped found the first York Rite Masonic Lodge in Mexico. He became a naturalized Mexican citizen in 1829 and contracted to settle five hundred families on lands in Texas formerly held by Haden Edwards.

He later was in charge of a customs house at the far north end of Galveston Bay. Fisher demanded that all ships landing at the mouth of the Brazos River pay their customs duties to him at Anahuac. This was a great hardship to area boat captains due to the great distances between that port and other Texas seaports. Fisher was forced to resign his post in early 1832 after a military confrontation with Texian settlers.

Later that year, Fisher began publishing the liberal newspaper Mercurio del Puerto de Matamoros in Matamoros. On October 13, 1835, Fisher and José Antonio Mexía organized a movement in New Orleans to attack Tampico and instigate a revolt among the eastern states of Mexico.

In 1837, he became a commission agent in Houston, in the Republic of Texas, and served as justice of the peace in 1839. Fisher was admitted to the bar in 1840 and was elected to the Houston city council. In 1843 he became a major in the Texas militia.

He traveled to Panama in 1850 and on to California in 1851. In 1853 while he was still Secretary for the California Land Commission, he may have gone to Washington. For there was printed in two and later three volumes "Portraits and Memoirs of Eminent Americans", in which a biographical sketch of Fisher appears as the sole entry from the state of California. It was written by the editor John Livingston, a New York lawyer.

Fisher's story aroused interest also in Europe as evidenced by many articles published in several European countries. The well-known Munich magazine of the epoch Das Ausland, of July, 1843, using material out of John Lloyd Stephens book which had appeared in London at the beginning of 1843 published several articles in sequence on this "adventurous Serb."

Fisher continued to serve in various civic and administrative posts in San Francisco from 1860 to 1870 until retirement. Soon after retiring, he was appointed by the King of Greece as Consul for that nation.

Fisher was married four times. He died in San Francisco on June 11, 1873.

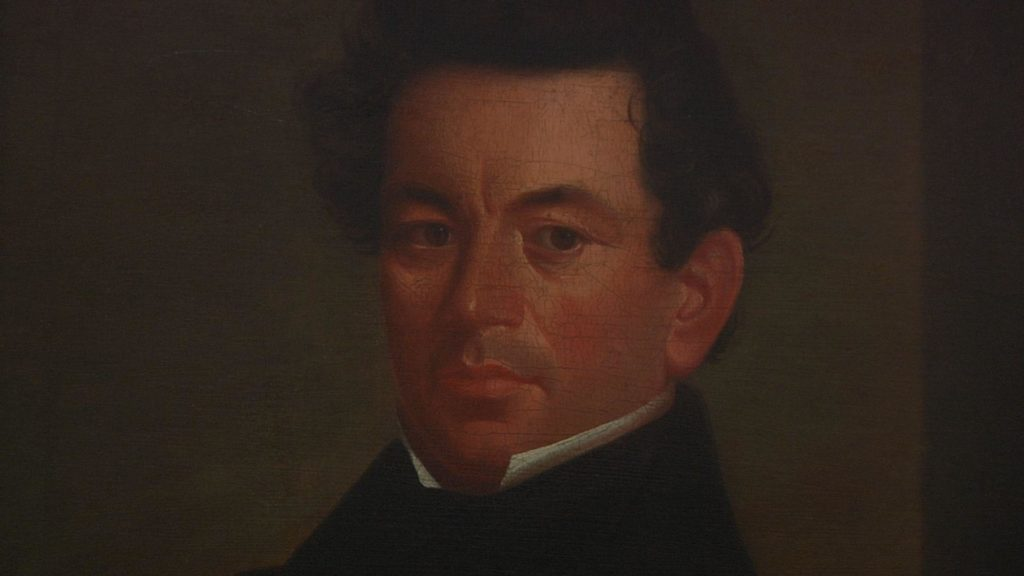
Portrait of George Fisher, oil on canvas, late 1830s or early 1840s

== See also ==
- List of Serbian Revolutionaries

== Sources ==
- Fisher Parmenter, Mary; Fisher, Walter Russell; Mallette, Lawrence Edward (1959). The Life of George Fisher, 1795-1873, and the History of the Fisher Family in Mississippi. H. & W. B. Drew. ISBN 978-1-2582-0206-4.
