= American Srbobran =

Serbian-language newspaper in the United States

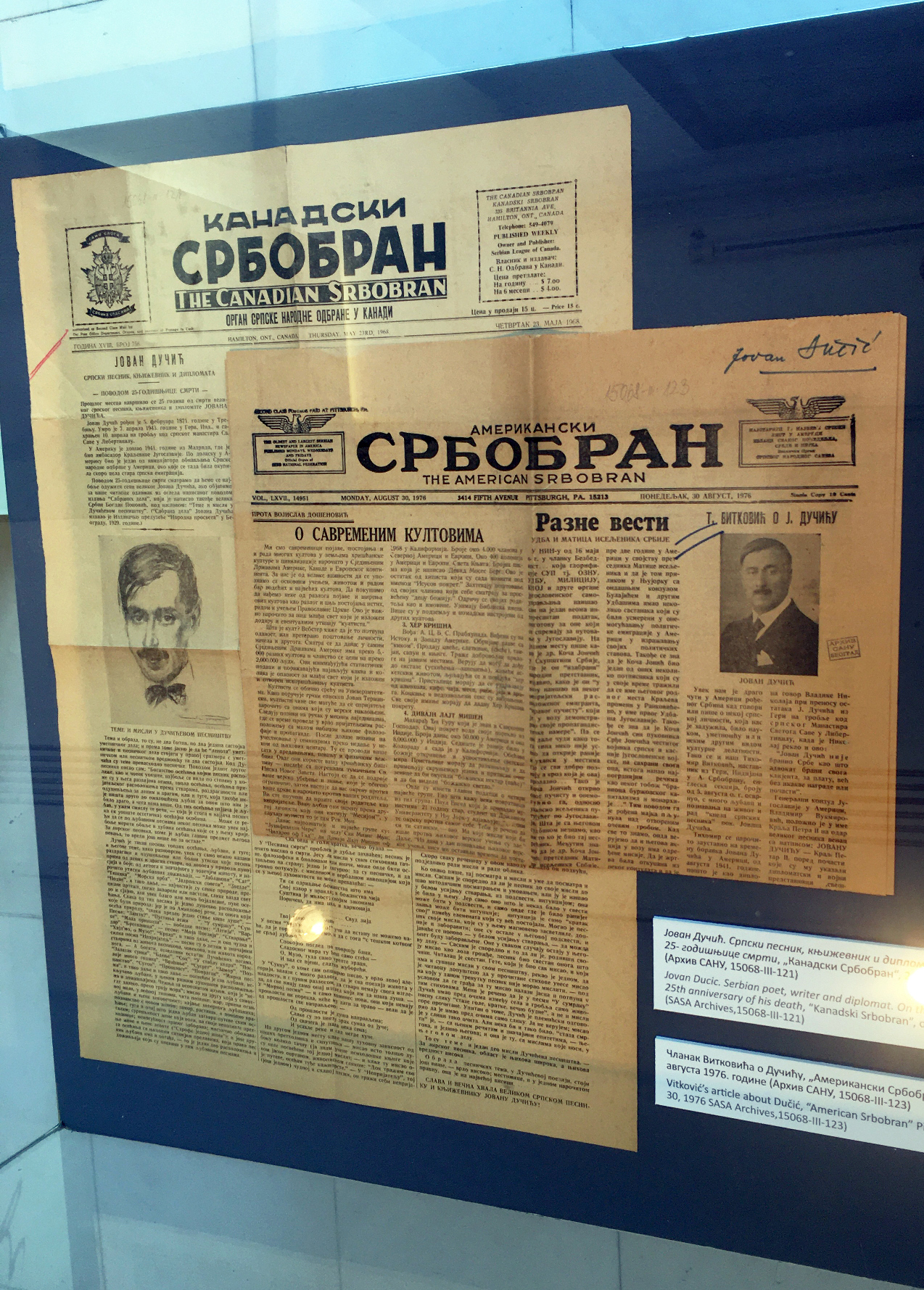
- A 1976 copy of American Srbobran in front of a copy of the Canadian Srbobran
- Type: Daily newspaper
- Founded: 1906
- Language: Serbian, English
- Headquarters: Pittsburgh, Pennsylvania
- Circulation: 10,000 (as of 1922)
- OCLC number: 8409538
- Website: snfpaper.org

American Srbobran is a bilingual Serbian and English language newspaper which has been published in Pittsburgh since 1906. The American Srbobran is the oldest Serbian-language newspaper currently in publication in the United States and Canada. The newspaper had a daily circulation of 10,000 in 1922. During World War II, the newspaper had a Serbian nationalist stance. Currently, the newspaper remains available in English and Serbian. The editor-in-chief is Ms. Sandi Radoja. It is a monthly printed publication, 28 pages in English and 4 in Serbian/Cyrillic, and is also available online at www.snfpaper.org. The paper is the official publication of the Serb National Federation.
